= National Register of Historic Places listings in the Northwest region of Texas =

This is a list of the National Register of Historic Places listings in Texas's Northwest region.

The Northwest region is an area of 30 counties defined by the Texas Comptroller for economic reporting in 2022, as mapped here.

The region included 2020 population of 550,000, or 1.9 percent of Texas' population, with the Abilene MSA having 32 percent of the Northwest region's population.

To see all locations together in a map, click on "Map all coordinates using OpenSourceMap" at right.

== Archer County ==
	Name on the Register	Image	Date listed	Location	City or town	Description
1	Archer County Courthouse and Jail	Archer County Courthouse and Jail	December 23, 1977 (#77001424)	Public Sq. and Sycamore and Pecan Sts. 33°35′42″N 98°37′31″W	Archer City	State Antiquities Landmark, includes two Recorded Texas Historic Landmarks; Romanesque Revival design. Constructed in 1891-1892.

== Baylor County ==
(has no NRHP listings)

== Brown County ==
	Name on the Register	Image	Date listed	Location	City or town	Description
1	Brown County Jail	Brown County Jail	September 22, 1983 (#83003129)	401 W. Broadway; 31°43′25″N 98°58′52″W	Brownwood	
2	Greenleaf Fisk House	Greenleaf Fisk House	February 25, 2004 (#04000103)	418 Milton Ave. 31°43′15″N 98°58′39″W	Brownwood	
3	R. F. Hardin High School	R. F. Hardin High School	June 25, 1999 (#99000722)	1009 Hall St. 31°43′30″N 98°59′26″W	Brownwood	
4	Santa Fe Railroad Station	Santa Fe Railroad Station	January 2, 1976 (#76002012)	Washington Ave. between E. Depot and E. Adams Sts. 31°42′57″N 98°58′47″W	Brownwood	Includes Recorded Texas Historic Landmarks
5	St. John's Church	St. John's Church	September 4, 1979 (#79002923)	700 Main Ave; 31°43′10″N 98°59′08″W	Brownwood	Recorded Texas Historic Landmark
6	J. A. Walker House and R. B. Rogers House	J. A. Walker House and R. B. Rogers House	July 19, 1982 (#82004494)	701 and 707 Center Ave. 31°43′06″N 98°59′05″W	Brownwood	Recorded Texas Historic Landmarks
7	Weakley-Watson Building	Weakley-Watson Building	February 28, 2020 (#100005003)	100-102 Fisk Ave. 31°43′14″N 98°58′47″W	Brownwood	

== Callahan County ==
	Name on the Register	Image	Date listed	Location	City or town	Description
1	Robert E. Howard House	Robert E. Howard House	August 19, 1994 (#94000984)	Jct. of TX 36 (Fourth St.) and Ave. J 32°07′17″N 99°10′19″W	Cross Plains	
2	Texas and Pacific Railway Depot	Texas and Pacific Railway Depot	April 10, 2012 (#12000194)	100 Market Street; 32°23′27″N 99°23′41″W	Baird	Recorded Texas Historic Landmark

== Clay County ==
	Name on the Register	Image	Date listed	Location	City or town	Description
1	Clay County Courthouse and Jail	Clay County Courthouse and Jail	October 3, 1978 (#78002904)	100 N. Bridge St. 33°48′57″N 98°11′45″W	Henrietta	State Antiquities Landmark, includes Recorded Texas Historic Landmarks
2	State Highway 79 Bridge at the Red River	State Highway 79 Bridge at the Red River	December 20, 1996 (#96001518)	OK 79 across the Red River at the OK-TX state line 34°07′56″N 98°05′39″W	Byers	Historic Bridges of Texas, 1866-1945 MPS; extends into Jefferson County, Oklahoma

== Coleman County ==
	Name on the Register	Image	Date listed	Location	City or town	Description
1	Camp Colorado Replica	Camp Colorado Replica	April 19, 2018 (#100002345)	Coleman City Park, 1700 N Neches; 31°50′51″N 99°25′33″W	Coleman	

== Comanche County ==
	Name on the Register	Image	Date listed	Location	City or town	Description
1	Comanche Downtown Historic District	Comanche Downtown Historic District	July 7, 2023 (#100009117)	Roughly bounded by West College and Oak Aves., North Pearl St., and the rear property line along North Mary St. 31°53′51″N 98°36′15″W	Comanche	
2	Captain James & Susannah Cunningham Homestead	Captain James & Susannah Cunningham Homestead	December 5, 2012 (#12000999)	19601 TX 16 S 31°44′34″N 98°31′21″W	Comanche	Recorded Texas Historic Landmark
3	St. Louis and San Francisco Railway Depot (Frisco Depot)	St. Louis and San Francisco Railway Depot (Frisco Depot)	December 4, 2017 (#100001872)	304 S. Austin St. 31°53′42″N 98°36′12″W	Comanche	

== Cottle County ==
	Name on the Register	Image	Date listed	Location	City or town	Description
1	Cottle County Courthouse Historic District	Cottle County Courthouse Historic District	September 10, 2004 (#04000948)	Roughly bounded by N. 7th, N. 10th, Garrett and Easly Sts. 34°00′50″N 100°18′05″W	Paducah	State Antiquities Landmark, Recorded Texas Historic Landmark

== Eastland County ==
	Name on the Register	Image	Date listed	Location	City or town	Description
1	Cisco Historic District	Cisco Historic District	November 20, 1984 (#84000334)	Roughly bounded by Conrad Hilton Ave., W. 3rd St., Ave. K, W. 8th and 9th Sts. 32°23′19″N 98°59′01″W	Cisco	Includes Recorded Texas Historic Landmarks
2	Mobley Hotel	Mobley Hotel	May 13, 1981 (#81000628)	4th St. and Conrad Hilton Ave. 32°23′30″N 98°58′51″W	Cisco	Part of Cisco Historic District; Recorded Texas Historic Landmark

== Fisher County ==
	Name on the Register	Image	Date listed	Location	City or town	Description
1	Foy Steadman Site	Foy Steadman Site	March 11, 1971 (#71000932)	Address restricted	Noodle	

== Foard County ==
(has no NRHP listings)

== Hardeman County ==
	Name on the Register	Image	Date listed	Location	City or town	Description
1	Quanah Commercial Historic District	Quanah Commercial Historic District	May 25, 2000 (#00000475)	Roughly bounded by Green, Second, Third, Fourth, Fifth, King, Elbert, and McClelland Sts., and Burlington Northern RR tr 34°17′53″N 99°44′22″W	Quanah	Includes State Antiquities Landmark, Recorded Texas Historic Landmarks
2	Quanah, Acme and Pacific Railway Depot	Quanah, Acme and Pacific Railway Depot	October 15, 1979 (#79002951)	100 Mercer St. 34°17′14″N 99°44′52″W	Quanah	Recorded Texas Historic Landmark; depot of the Quanah, Acme and Pacific Railway

== Haskell County ==
(has no NRHP listings)

== Jack County ==
	Name on the Register	Image	Date listed	Location	City or town	Description
1	Fort Richardson	Fort Richardson	October 15, 1966 (#66000816)	S of Jacksboro on U.S. 281; 33°12′25″N 98°09′50″W	Jacksboro	State Historic Site, State Antiquities Landmark, contains Recorded Texas Historic Landmarks; established 1867, abandoned 1878, renovated and reopened 1973 as historic park.
2	Jack County Courthouse	Jack County Courthouse	December 4, 2012 (#12001002)	100 N Main St. 33°13′08″N 98°09′29″W	Jacksboro	

== Jones County ==
	Name on the Register	Image	Date listed	Location	City or town	Description
1	J. P. Astin House	J. P. Astin House	September 24, 1986 (#86002390)	111 E. Campbell; 32°56′56″N 99°48′06″W	Stamford	
2	Buena Vista Hotel	Buena Vista Hotel	September 24, 1986 (#86002369)	123 N. Wetherbee; 32°56′47″N 99°48′07″W	Stamford	
3	Dr. E. P. Bunkley House and Garage	Dr. E. P. Bunkley House and Garage	September 24, 1986 (#86002380)	1034 E. Reynolds; 32°56′25″N 99°47′12″W	Stamford	
4	First Baptist Church	First Baptist Church	September 24, 1986 (#86002359)	E. Oliver and N. Swenson; 32°56′50″N 99°48′08″W	Stamford	Recorded Texas Historic Landmark
5	Fort Phantom Hill	Fort Phantom Hill	September 14, 1972 (#72001367)	N of Abilene on Ranch Rd. 600; 32°38′38″N 99°40′41″W	Abilene	
6	House at 501 North Swenson	House at 501 North Swenson	September 24, 1986 (#86002374)	501 N. Swenson; 32°57′01″N 99°48′12″W	Stamford	
7	House at 502 South Orient	House at 502 South Orient	September 24, 1986 (#86002377)	502 S. Orient; 32°56′25″N 99°47′41″W	Stamford	
8	House at 610 East Oliver	House at 610 East Oliver	September 24, 1986 (#86002394)	610 E. Oliver; 32°56′50″N 99°47′43″W	Stamford	
9	House at 709 East Reynolds	House at 709 East Reynolds	September 24, 1986 (#86002384)	709 E. Reynolds; 32°56′28″N 99°47′37″W	Stamford	
10	House at 719 East Reynolds	House at 719 East Reynolds	September 24, 1986 (#86002385)	719 E. Reynolds; 32°56′28″N 99°47′35″W	Stamford	
11	House at 815 East Campbell		September 24, 1986 (#86002392)	815 E. Campbell; 32°56′56″N 99°47′28″W	Stamford	
12	A. J. Jackson House		September 24, 1986 (#86002366)	305 S. Ferguson; 32°56′33″N 99°48′02″W	Stamford	Demolished
13	Jones County Courthouse	Jones County Courthouse	May 1, 2003 (#03000330)	1100 12th St. 32°45′23″N 99°53′47″W	Anson	Recorded Texas Historic Landmark
14	Old Bryant-Link Building	Old Bryant-Link Building	September 24, 1986 (#86002361)	120 S. Swenson; 32°56′41″N 99°48′11″W	Stamford	
15	Old Penick-Hughes Company	Old Penick-Hughes Company	September 24, 1986 (#86002354)	100-106 E. Hamilton; 32°56′38″N 99°48′09″W	Stamford	
16	Old West Texas Utilities Company	Old West Texas Utilities Company	September 24, 1986 (#86002335)	127 E. McHarg; 32°56′44″N 99°48′06″W	Stamford	
17	Old H. O. Wooten Grocery		September 24, 1986 (#86002363)	128 E. Rotan; 32°56′34″N 99°48′06″W	Stamford	Demolished
18	Saint John's Methodist Church	Saint John's Methodist Church	September 24, 1986 (#86002351)	S. Ferguson St. 32°56′38″N 99°47′59″W	Stamford	Recorded Texas Historic Landmark
19	SMS Building	SMS Building	September 24, 1986 (#86002336)	101 S. Wetherbee and 210 E. McHarg; 32°56′42″N 99°48′05″W	Stamford	
20	Stamford City Hall	Stamford City Hall	September 24, 1986 (#86002348)	201 E. McHarg; 32°56′44″N 99°48′05″W	Stamford	
21	A. J. Swenson House		September 24, 1986 (#86002395)	305 E. Oliver; 32°56′52″N 99°47′48″W	Stamford	
22	US Post Office	US Post Office	September 24, 1986 (#86002332)	115 S. Swenson St. 32°56′41″N 99°48′08″W	Stamford	

== Kent County ==
	Name on the Register	Image	Date listed	Location	City or town	Description
1	First National Bank Building	First National Bank Building	August 29, 1977 (#97001209)	402 Donaho St. 33°14′52″N 100°34′27″W	Jayton	Recorded Texas Historic Landmark

== Knox County ==
	Name on the Register	Image	Date listed	Location	City or town	Description
1	State Highway 16 Bridge at the Brazos River	State Highway 16 Bridge at the Brazos River	October 10, 1996 (#96001123)	TX 6, 6 mi (9.7 km). S of jct. with US 82; 33°30′02″N 99°48′07″W	Benjamin	Recorded Texas Historic Landmark

== Mitchell County ==
	Name on the Register	Image	Date listed	Location	City or town	Description
1	Scott-Majors House	Scott-Majors House	February 5, 1979 (#79002995)	425 Chestnut St. 32°23′27″N 100°51′52″W	Colorado City	Recorded Texas Historic Landmark

== Montague County ==
	Name on the Register	Image	Date listed	Location	City or town	Description
1	Montague County Courthouse and Jail	Montague County Courthouse and Jail	July 24, 2017 (#100001377)	101 E. Franklin St. 33°39′52″N 97°43′12″W	Montague	Includes Recorded Texas Historic Landmarks
2	Spanish Fort Site	Spanish Fort Site	April 14, 1975 (#75002000)	Address restricted	Spanish Fort	

== Nolan County ==
	Name on the Register	Image	Date listed	Location	City or town	Description
1	First National Bank Building	First National Bank Building	May 26, 1983 (#83003154)	101 E. 3rd St. 32°28′16″N 100°24′30″W	Sweetwater	Part of Sweetwater Commercial Historic District
2	I.M. and Margaret Newman House	I.M. and Margaret Newman House	August 14, 2003 (#03000771)	309 Ragland St. 32°28′29″N 100°24′09″W	Sweetwater	Recorded Texas Historic Landmark
3	R. A. Ragland Building	R. A. Ragland Building	May 14, 1979 (#79003001)	113-117 3rd St. 32°28′17″N 100°24′29″W	Sweetwater	Recorded Texas Historic Landmark; part of Sweetwater Commercial Historic District
4	Sweetwater Commercial Historic District	Sweetwater Commercial Historic District	June 7, 1984 (#84001915)	Roughly between 1st and 5th, and Ash and Texas and Pacific RR tracks 32°27′48″N 100°24′37″W	Sweetwater	

== Runnels County ==
	Name on the Register	Image	Date listed	Location	City or town	Description
1	Ballinger Carnegie Library	Ballinger Carnegie Library	June 18, 1975 (#75002002)	204 N. 8th St. 31°44′23″N 99°56′59″W	Ballinger	State Antiquities Landmark, Recorded Texas Historic Landmark
2	Edwin and Hattie Day House	Edwin and Hattie Day House	January 3, 1985 (#85000047)	302 N. Broadway; 31°44′31″N 99°56′54″W	Ballinger	
3	J. Thiele Building	J. Thiele Building	June 29, 1976 (#76002061)	Robinson and 2nd Sts. 31°35′54″N 100°11′00″W	Miles	Recorded Texas Historic Landmark
4	Van Pelt House	Van Pelt House	December 3, 1980 (#80004146)	209 10th St. 31°44′19″N 99°57′08″W	Ballinger	

== Scurry County ==
(has no NRHP listings)

== Shackelford County ==
	Name on the Register	Image	Date listed	Location	City or town	Description
1	Fort Griffin	Fort Griffin	March 11, 1971 (#71000962)	15 mi (24 km). N of Albany on U.S. 283; 32°55′35″N 99°13′55″W	Albany	Texas State Historic Site, State Antiquities Landmark
2	Fort Griffin Brazos River Bridge	Fort Griffin Brazos River Bridge	October 16, 1979 (#79003006)	NE of Fort Griffin; 32°56′05″N 99°13′26″W	Fort Griffin	State Antiquities Landmark
3	Hubbard Creek Bridge	Hubbard Creek Bridge	October 10, 1996 (#96001105)	FM 601, 7.5 mi (12.1 km). E of Jct with TX 6; 32°41′25″N 99°09′53″W	Albany	
4	Shackelford County Courthouse Historic District	Shackelford County Courthouse Historic District	July 30, 1976 (#76002065)	Roughly bounded by S. 1st, S. 4th, S. Jacobs, and S. Pecan Sts. 32°43′21″N 99°17′46″W	Albany	Contains State Antiquities Landmark, several Recorded Texas Historic Landmarks
5	State Highway 23 Bridge at the Clear Fork of the Brazos River	State Highway 23 Bridge at the Clear Fork of the Brazos River	October 10, 1996 (#96001106)	US 283, 2.3 mi (3.7 km). S of Throckmorton Cnty. Line; 32°55′58″N 99°12′54″W	Albany	

== Stephens County ==
	Name on the Register	Image	Date listed	Location	City or town	Description
1	Fort Davis Family Fort	Fort Davis Family Fort	October 28, 1992 (#92001363)	Address restricted 32°54′55″N 99°05′35″W	Breckenridge	
2	Stephens County Courthouse	Stephens County Courthouse	July 9, 1997 (#97000781)	200 W. Walker St. 32°45′21″N 98°54′15″W	Breckenridge	State Antiquities Landmark, Recorded Texas Historic Landmark

== Stonewall County ==
(has no NRHP listings)

== Taylor County ==
	Name on the Register	Image	Date listed	Location	City or town	Description
1	1915 Taylor County Courthouse	1915 Taylor County Courthouse	March 23, 1992 (#92000225)	301 Oak St. 32°26′45″N 99°43′55″W	Abilene	State Antiquities Landmark
2	Abilene and Northern Railway Company Depot	Abilene and Northern Railway Company Depot	May 28, 2004 (#92000191)	189 Locust St. 32°26′51″N 99°43′47″W	Abilene	
3	Abilene Christian College Administration Building	Abilene Christian College Administration Building	March 23, 1992 (#92000193)	Campus Court Dr., Abilene Christian University; 32°28′01″N 99°42′37″W	Abilene	
4	Abilene Commercial Historic District	Abilene Commercial Historic District	December 18, 1991 (#91001811)	Roughly bounded by Hickory, N. 3rd, and Pine Sts. and the southern side of the Missouri Pacific railroad tracks; also 159 and 101 Walnut St. 32°27′01″N 99°44′01″W	Abilene	Includes Recorded Texas Historic Landmark; boundary increases approved December 11, 2020 and May 5, 2023
5	Abilene Courts	Abilene Courts	June 3, 2015 (#15000338)	633 S. 11th St. 32°26′13″N 99°43′51″W	Abilene	
6	Abilene Fire Station No. 2	Abilene Fire Station No. 2	March 23, 1992 (#92000200)	441 Butternut; 32°26′41″N 99°44′15″W	Abilene	
7	Abilene High School	Abilene High School	August 28, 2012 (#12000588)	1699 South 1st Street; 32°26′53″N 99°44′32″W	Abilene	
8	Abilene Street Railway Company Barn	Abilene Street Railway Company Barn	March 23, 1992 (#92000205)	1037 Clinton St. 32°27′41″N 99°44′37″W	Abilene	
9	William and Mary Ackers House	William and Mary Ackers House	March 23, 1992 (#92000214)	802 Mulberry St. 32°27′26″N 99°44′24″W	Abilene	
10	Alexander-Campbell House	Alexander-Campbell House	March 29, 1996 (#96000308)	1546 N. 5th St. 32°27′16″N 99°44′23″W	Abilene	
11	Bankhead Highway Historic District		December 3, 1998 (#98001414)	Approximately 4 mi (6.4 km). sections of former US 80 contained within Taylor County; 32°27′43″N 99°54′21″W	Abilene	
12	Thomas L. Blanton House	Thomas L. Blanton House	March 23, 1992 (#92000234)	3425 S. Seventh St. 32°26′36″N 99°45′59″W	Abilene	
13	Borden Company		April 11, 2024 (#100010209)	309 South Pioneer Drive; 32°26′52″N 99°46′45″W	Abilene	
14	Boyd-Hall House	Boyd-Hall House	March 23, 1992 (#92000229)	502 Poplar St. 32°26′40″N 99°44′22″W	Abilene	
15	Caldwell Hall	Caldwell Hall	March 23, 1992 (#92000206)	Intracampus Dr., Hardin-Simmons University; 32°28′39″N 99°44′07″W	Abilene	
16	W. A. V. Cash House	W. A. V. Cash House	March 23, 1992 (#92000195)	1302 Amarillo; 32°26′04″N 99°44′49″W	Abilene	
17	David S. Castle House	David S. Castle House	March 23, 1992 (#92000218)	1742 N. Second St. 32°27′04″N 99°44′33″W	Abilene	
18	George R. Davis House	George R. Davis House	March 23, 1992 (#92000237)	718 Victoria; 32°27′25″N 99°44′45″W	Abilene	
19	O. D. and Ada Dillingham House	O. D. and Ada Dillingham House	March 23, 1992 (#92000199)	1625 Belmont; 32°25′45″N 99°44′13″W	Abilene	
20	Dodd-Harkrider House	Dodd-Harkrider House	March 23, 1992 (#92000222)	2026 N. Third St. 32°27′11″N 99°44′46″W	Abilene	
21	J. W. Evans House	J. W. Evans House	March 23, 1992 (#92000204)	258 Clinton St. 32°27′09″N 99°44′40″W	Abilene	
22	Federal Building	Federal Building	July 20, 1992 (#92000228)	341 Pine; 32°27′07″N 99°43′55″W	Abilene	
23	Eugene L. Finley House	Eugene L. Finley House	March 23, 1992 (#92000210)	208 Merchant; 32°27′06″N 99°44′35″W	Abilene	
24	First Presbyterian Church	First Presbyterian Church	March 23, 1992 (#92000226)	402 Orange St. 32°27′11″N 99°44′17″W	Abilene	
25	David C. and Docia Fritz House	David C. and Docia Fritz House	March 23, 1992 (#92000215)	1325 N. Eighteenth St. 32°28′11″N 99°44′06″W	Abilene	
26	William J. Fulwiler House		November 26, 2018 (#92000192)	910 Highland St. 32°26′20″N 99°44′58″W	Abilene	
27	Albert S. and Ruth Goodloe House	Albert S. and Ruth Goodloe House	March 23, 1992 (#92000232)	1302 Sayles Blvd. 32°26′00″N 99°44′53″W	Abilene	
28	Roland A. D. Green House	Roland A. D. Green House	March 23, 1992 (#92000207)	1358 Highland St. 32°26′04″N 99°44′54″W	Abilene	
29	J. G. Higginbotham House	J. G. Higginbotham House	March 23, 1992 (#92000236)	2102 Swenson; 32°28′23″N 99°44′27″W	Abilene	
30	Hilton Hotel	Hilton Hotel	December 23, 1993 (#85003658)	986 N. Fourth St. 32°27′10″N 99°43′57″W	Abilene	
31	Ed S. Hughes Company Warehouse		March 23, 1992 (#92000224)	135 Oak St. 32°26′52″N 99°43′56″W	Abilene	
32	A. T. Jones House	A. T. Jones House	March 23, 1992 (#92000212)	418 Merchant; 32°27′15″N 99°44′36″W	Abilene	
33	C. A. Lanius House	C. A. Lanius House	March 23, 1992 (#92000221)	1942 N. Third St. 32°27′11″N 99°44′41″W	Abilene	
34	Luce Hall	Luce Hall	March 23, 1992 (#92000194)	Campus Court Dr., north of Administration Building, Abilene Christian University; 32°27′59″N 99°42′38″W	Abilene	
35	J. D. Magee House	J. D. Magee House	March 23, 1992 (#92000220)	1910 N. Third St. 32°27′11″N 99°44′33″W	Abilene	Recorded Texas Historic Landmark
36	George W. and Lavina McDaniel House	George W. and Lavina McDaniel House	March 23, 1992 (#92000201)	774 Butternut; 32°26′28″N 99°44′17″W	Abilene	
37	McDonald Hall	McDonald Hall	March 23, 1992 (#92000219)	2083 N. Second St. 32°27′05″N 99°44′36″W	Abilene	
38	McMurry College Administration Building	McMurry College Administration Building	March 23, 1992 (#92000209)	Off Hunt, McMurry College; 32°25′45″N 99°45′04″W	Abilene	
39	William A. Minter House	William A. Minter House	March 23, 1992 (#92000198)	340 Beech St. 32°27′08″N 99°44′20″W	Abilene	
40	Charles Motz House	Charles Motz House	March 23, 1992 (#92000216)	1842 N. Fifth St. 32°27′16″N 99°44′36″W	Abilene	
41	Old Taylor County Courthouse and Jail	Old Taylor County Courthouse and Jail	June 9, 1978 (#78002984)	William St. between North and Elm Sts. 32°17′10″N 99°49′36″W	Buffalo Gap	Recorded Texas Historic Landmark
42	Paramount Theater	Paramount Theater	December 27, 1982 (#82001739)	352 Cypress St. 32°27′08″N 99°44′02″W	Abilene	
43	Parramore Historic District	Parramore Historic District	August 29, 1991 (#91001153)	Bounded by Orange, N. 8th, alley between Grape and Mulberry, and N. 7th Sts. 32°27′25″N 99°44′18″W	Abilene	
44	D. D. Parramore House	D. D. Parramore House	March 23, 1992 (#92000230)	542 Poplar St. 32°26′38″N 99°44′18″W	Abilene	
45	Jhules Reading House		March 23, 1992 (#92000231)	421 Reading St. 32°27′13″N 99°44′31″W	Abilene	
46	Nathan J. and Nancy Roberts House		March 23, 1992 (#92000235)	1430 S. Sixth St. 32°26′38″N 99°44′22″W	Abilene	
47	Sacred Heart Catholic Church	Sacred Heart Catholic Church	March 23, 1992 (#92000233)	1633 S. Eighth St. 32°26′27″N 99°44′32″W	Abilene	Recorded Texas Historic Landmark
48	Sayles Boulevard Historic District	Sayles Boulevard Historic District	March 9, 1992 (#92000095)	Roughly bounded by S. Fifth, Meander and S. Tenth Sts. and Highland Ave. 32°26′31″N 99°44′50″W	Abilene	Includes Recorded Texas Historic Landmark
49	Henry Sayles House	Henry Sayles House	June 24, 1976 (#76002069)	642 Sayles Blvd. 32°26′37″N 99°44′53″W	Abilene	Recorded Texas Historic Landmark
50	State Epileptic Colony Historic District		October 30, 1991 (#91001539)	Roughly bounded by S. 24th, Lakeside and Plum, also area roughly bounded by SH 322, FM 1750 and Industrial Blvd. 32°24′45″N 99°42′58″W	Abilene	
51	William and Evla Stith House	William and Evla Stith House	March 23, 1992 (#92000213)	346 Mulberry St. 32°27′09″N 99°44′24″W	Abilene	
52	William and Shirley Swenson House	William and Shirley Swenson House	December 22, 1987 (#87002148)	1726 Swenson Ave. 32°28′10″N 99°44′28″W	Abilene	Recorded Texas Historic Landmark
53	Oscar P. Thomas House	Oscar P. Thomas House	March 23, 1992 (#92000203)	210 Clinton St. 32°27′06″N 99°44′40″W	Abilene	
54	Travis Elementary School and Cafetorium		January 20, 2023 (#100008557)	1101 South 9th St. 32°26′21″N 99°44′13″W	Abilene	
55	U.S. Weather Bureau Building	U.S. Weather Bureau Building	July 8, 1982 (#82004524)	1482 N. 1st St. 32°27′00″N 99°44′20″W	Abilene	Recorded Texas Historic Landmark
56	Universal Manufacturing Company Building	Universal Manufacturing Company Building	March 23, 1992 (#92000208)	150 Locust St. 32°26′51″N 99°43′47″W	Abilene	
57	West Texas Utilities Company Power Plant	West Texas Utilities Company Power Plant	March 23, 1992 (#92000217)	100 Block of N. Second St. 32°27′03″N 99°43′19″W	Abilene	
58	E. D. Williamson House	E. D. Williamson House	March 23, 1992 (#92000202)	641 Chestnut St. 32°26′33″N 99°44′01″W	Abilene	
59	Horace O. Wooten Grocery Company Warehouse	Horace O. Wooten Grocery Company Warehouse	March 23, 1992 (#92000238)	101 Walnut; 32°26′58″N 99°43′51″W	Abilene	
60	Horace O. Wooten House	Horace O. Wooten House	March 23, 1992 (#92000197)	242 Beech St. 32°27′04″N 99°44′20″W	Abilene	
61	Zabloudil-Hendrick House	Zabloudil-Hendrick House	March 23, 1992 (#92000227)	802 Orange St. 32°27′28″N 99°44′15″W	Abilene	

== Throckmorton County ==
	Name on the Register	Image	Date listed	Location	City or town	Description
1	Throckmorton County Courthouse and Jail	Throckmorton County Courthouse and Jail	August 10, 1978 (#78002987)	Public Sq. and Chestnut St. 33°10′44″N 99°10′40″W	Throckmorton	State Antiquities Landmark, Recorded Texas Historic Landmark

== Wichita County ==
	Name on the Register	Image	Date listed	Location	City or town	Description
1	American Trust Building-Holiday Inn	American Trust Building-Holiday Inn	August 9, 2022 (#100008026)	726 Scott Ave. 33°54′43″N 98°29′33″W	Wichita Falls	
2	Bailey-Moline-Filgo Building		September 4, 2020 (#100005538)	1000-1004 Indiana Ave. 33°54′37″N 98°29′21″W	Wichita Falls	
3	Beaver Creek Bridge	Beaver Creek Bridge	October 10, 1996 (#96001104)	FM 2326, 1 mi (1.6 km) W of jct. with TX 25; 33°54′21″N 98°54′17″W	Electra	
4	Depot Square Historic District	Depot Square Historic District	February 4, 2004 (#03001552)	Roughly bounded by 8th St., Indiana St., 5th St. and MKT Railroad tracks 33°54′58″N 98°29′26″W	Wichita Falls	Includes State Antiquities Landmark, Recorded Texas Historic Landmark
5	First Wichita National Bank		October 31, 2023 (#100009496)	719 Scott Ave. 33°54′45″N 98°29′33″W	Wichita Falls	
6	W.A. Freear Furniture Company - Maskat Shrine Temple Building		July 23, 2018 (#100002701)	1100 Lamar St. 33°54′29″N 98°29′28″W	Wichita Falls	
7	William Benjamin Hamilton House	William Benjamin Hamilton House	October 28, 1983 (#83003826)	1106 Brook Ave. 33°54′02″N 98°30′13″W	Wichita Falls	
8	Hodges-Hardy-Chambers House	Hodges-Hardy-Chambers House	May 2, 1985 (#85000925)	1100 Travis St. 33°54′26″N 98°28′12″W	Wichita Falls	Recorded Texas Historic Landmark
9	Indiana Avenue Historic District		January 30, 2023 (#100008585)	900-1008 Indiana Ave. 33°54′39″N 98°29′22″W	Wichita Falls	
10	Frank Kell House	Frank Kell House	November 28, 1978 (#78003378)	900 Bluff St. 33°54′27″N 98°29′49″W	Wichita Falls	Recorded Texas Historic Landmark; 1909 Neoclassical Revival-style home of Frank Kell, one of Wichita Falls' founding fathers
11	Morningside Historic District	Morningside Historic District	May 16, 1985 (#85001122)	Roughly bounded by 9th St., Morningside Dr., Pembroke Lane and Buchanan St. 33°54′21″N 98°31′23″W	Wichita Falls	
12	Joe and Lois Perkins House	Joe and Lois Perkins House	June 8, 2015 (#15000339)	3301 Harrison Street; 33°52′44″N 98°30′45″W	Wichita Falls	Recorded Texas Historic Landmark
13	Weeks House		December 3, 1980 (#80004158)	2112 Kell Boulevard; 33°53′29″N 98°30′48″W	Wichita Falls	Recorded Texas Historic Landmark
14	Wichita Falls Route Building	Wichita Falls Route Building	November 29, 1978 (#78002999)	503 8th St. 33°54′48″N 98°29′20″W	Wichita Falls	State Antiquities Landmark; part of Depot Square Historic District

== Wilbarger County ==
	Name on the Register	Image	Date listed	Location	City or town	Description
1	Doan's Adobe House	Doan's Adobe House	February 8, 1979 (#79003023)	E of Odell off U.S. 283; 34°20′37″N 99°15′21″W	Doans	Recorded Texas Historic Landmark
2	Plaza Theater	Plaza Theater	October 6, 2023 (#100009409)	1701-1717 Cumberland St. 34°09′12″N 99°17′00″W	Vernon	

== Young County ==
	Name on the Register	Image	Date listed	Location	City or town	Description
1	Fort Belknap	Fort Belknap	October 15, 1966 (#66000824)	1 mi (1.6 km). S of jct. of TX 24 and 251; 33°09′03″N 98°44′29″W	Newcastle	Recorded Texas Historic Landmark, contains additional Recorded Texas Historic Landmark
2	Graham Post Office	Graham Post Office	June 25, 1999 (#99000724)	510 Third St. 33°06′20″N 98°35′27″W	Graham	Recorded Texas Historic Landmark; now used as the Old Post Office Museum & Art Center.
3	Harrell site		October 15, 1966 (#66000825)	Address restricted	South Bend	
4	National Theater	National Theater	June 24, 1993 (#93000565)	522 Oak St. 33°06′22″N 98°35′30″W	Graham	
5	Spencer Boyd Street Houses	Spencer Boyd Street Houses	August 16, 1984 (#84002005)	800 and 804 3rd St. 33°06′20″N 98°35′09″W	Graham	
6	State Highway 120 Bridge at the Brazos River	State Highway 120 Bridge at the Brazos River	February 22, 2018 (#100002132)	Hardin Ln. at the Brazos R. 33°10′30″N 98°45′22″W	Newcastle vicinity	
