= National Register of Historic Places listings in Texas =

These historic properties and districts in the state of Texas are listed in the National Register of Historic Places. Properties and/or districts are listed in most of Texas's 254 counties.

The tables linked below are intended to provide a complete list of properties and districts listed in each county. The locations of National Register properties and districts with latitude and longitude data may be seen in an online map by clicking on "Map of all coordinates".

The names on the lists are as they were entered into the National Register; some place names are uncommon or have changed since being added to the National Register.

This National Park Service list is complete through NPS recent listings posted October 23, 2026.

== Current listings by county ==
The map below shows approximate tallies of current listings by county (not always updated to current numbers). The second map shows a partition of the counties into 12 regions of Texas, as defined by the Texas comptroller. The table, further below, reports currently listings by county, updated frequently. (Note: Based on entries in the National Register Information Database as of April 24, 2008 and new weekly listings posted since then on the National Register of Historic Places web site. Frequent additions to the listings and occasional delistings are made, so the counts here are approximate and not official. New entries are added to the official Register on a weekly basis. Also, the counts in this table exclude boundary increase and decrease listings which modify the area covered by an existing property or district and which carry a separate National Register reference number. The numbers of NRHP listings in each county are documented by tables in each of the individual county list-articles.)

Regions are defined by the Texas State Comptroller, who has partitioned the state into 12 regions for economic performance reporting, as shown here.

As of March 2022, corresponding to the map of tallies of current listings by county, region totals were:

	Region	# of counties	# of sites
1	Alamo	19	
2	Capital	10	
3	Central	20	
4	Gulf Coast	13	
5	High Plains	41	
6	Metroplex	19	
7	Northwest	30	
8	South Texas	28	
9	Southeast	15	
10	Upper East	23	
11	Upper Rio Grande	6	
12	West Texas	30	
	Total	254	

The table, below, reports counts of NRHP and NHL listings for each county, as well as region in which each is located. Click on a "County" column link to see table of listings for a given county, alone. Click on its "Region" column link to see the same table of listings amongst tables for other counties in the region. This latter allows one to see, by "Map all coordinates using OSM" link, the locations of all listings in the region.

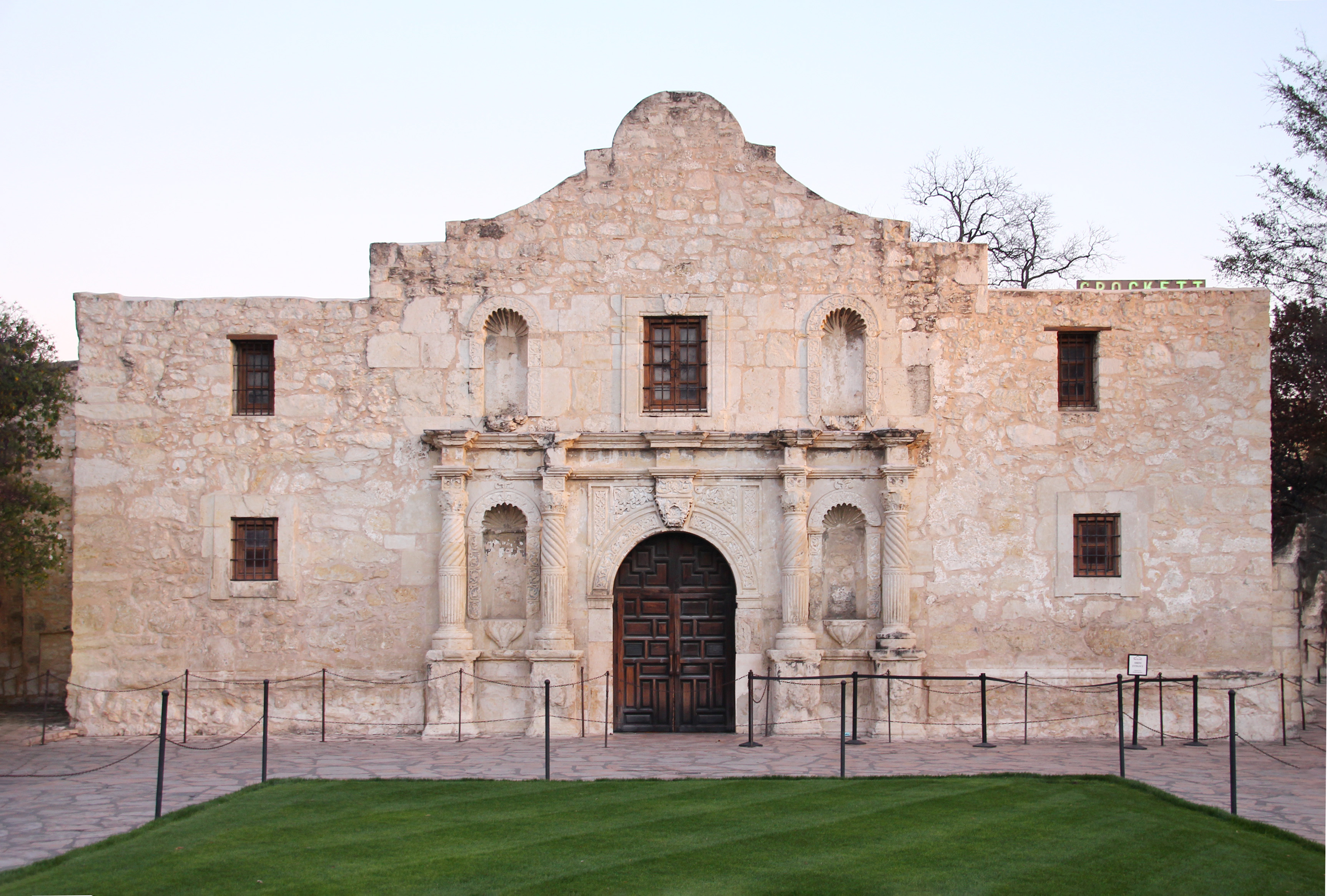
The Alamo, San Antonio
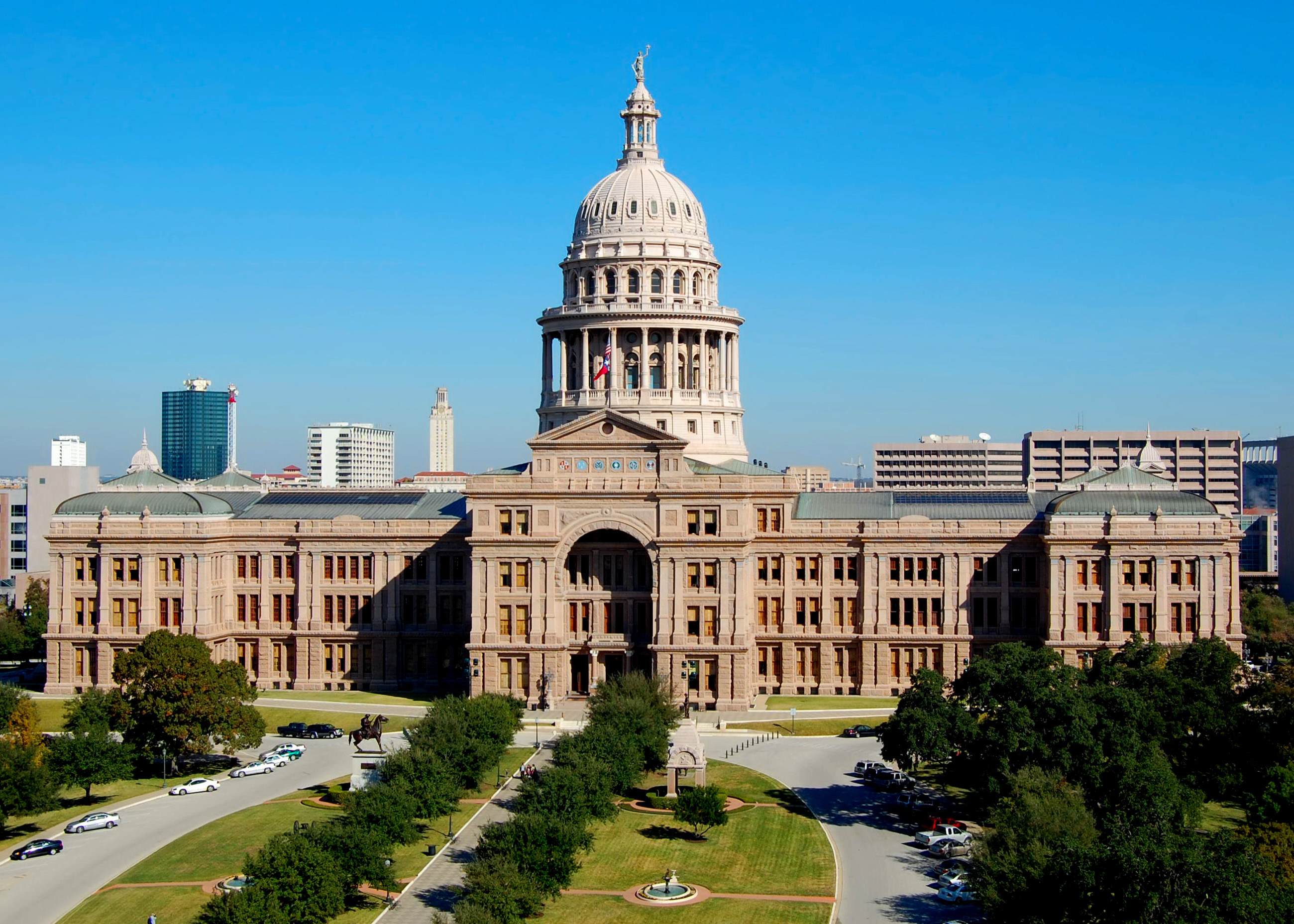
Texas State Capitol, Austin
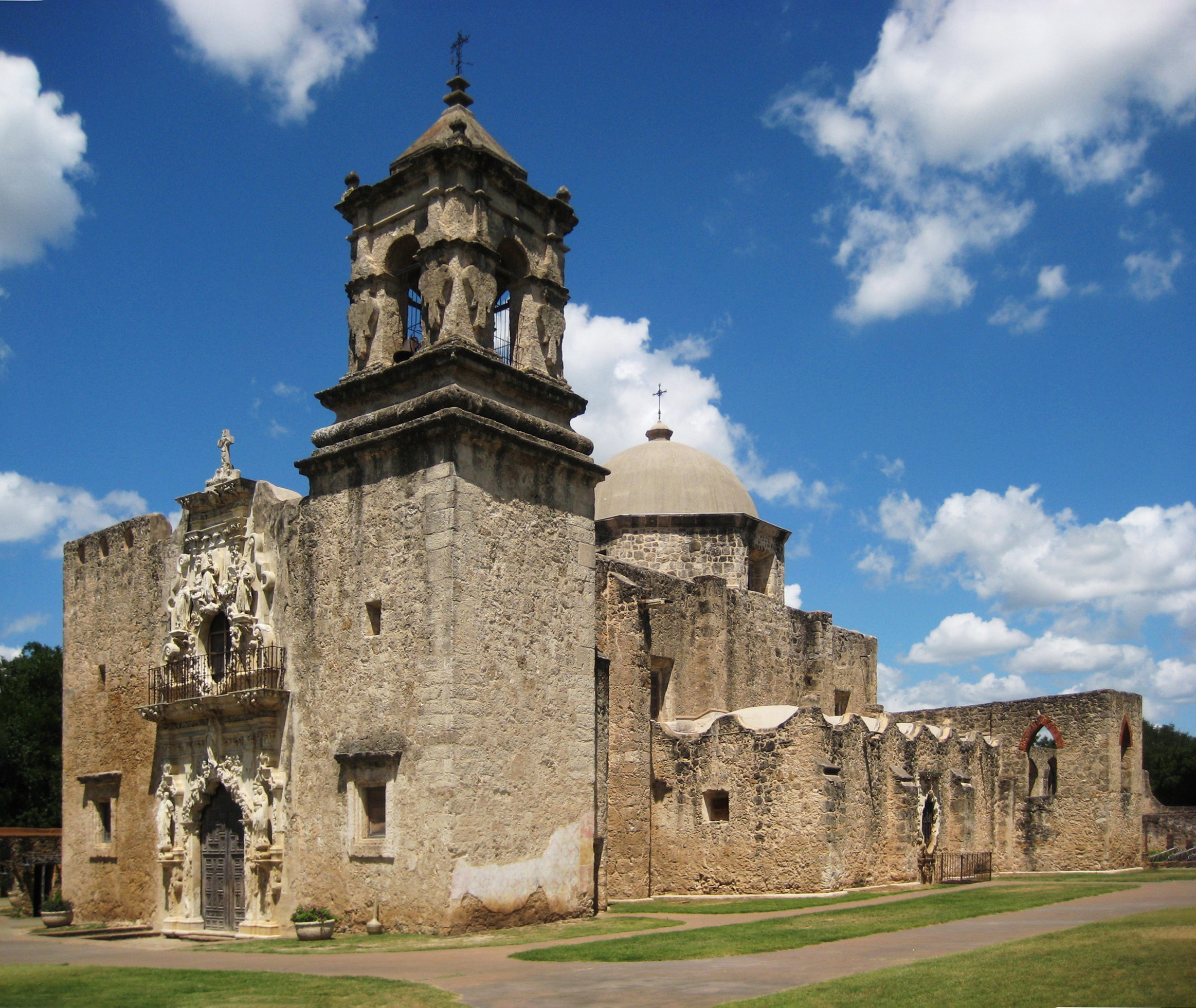
Mission San José, San Antonio
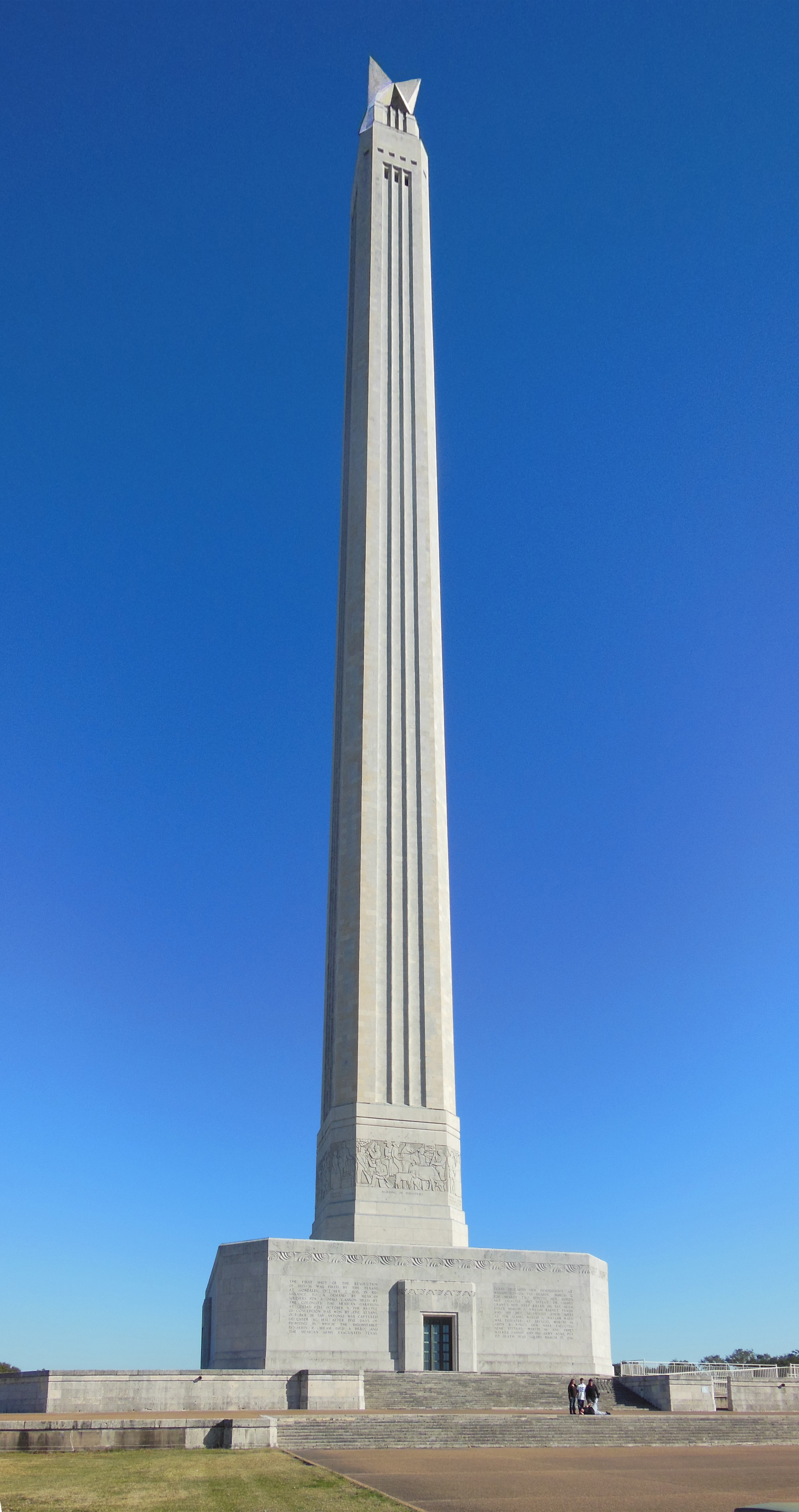
San Jacinto Monument, La Porte
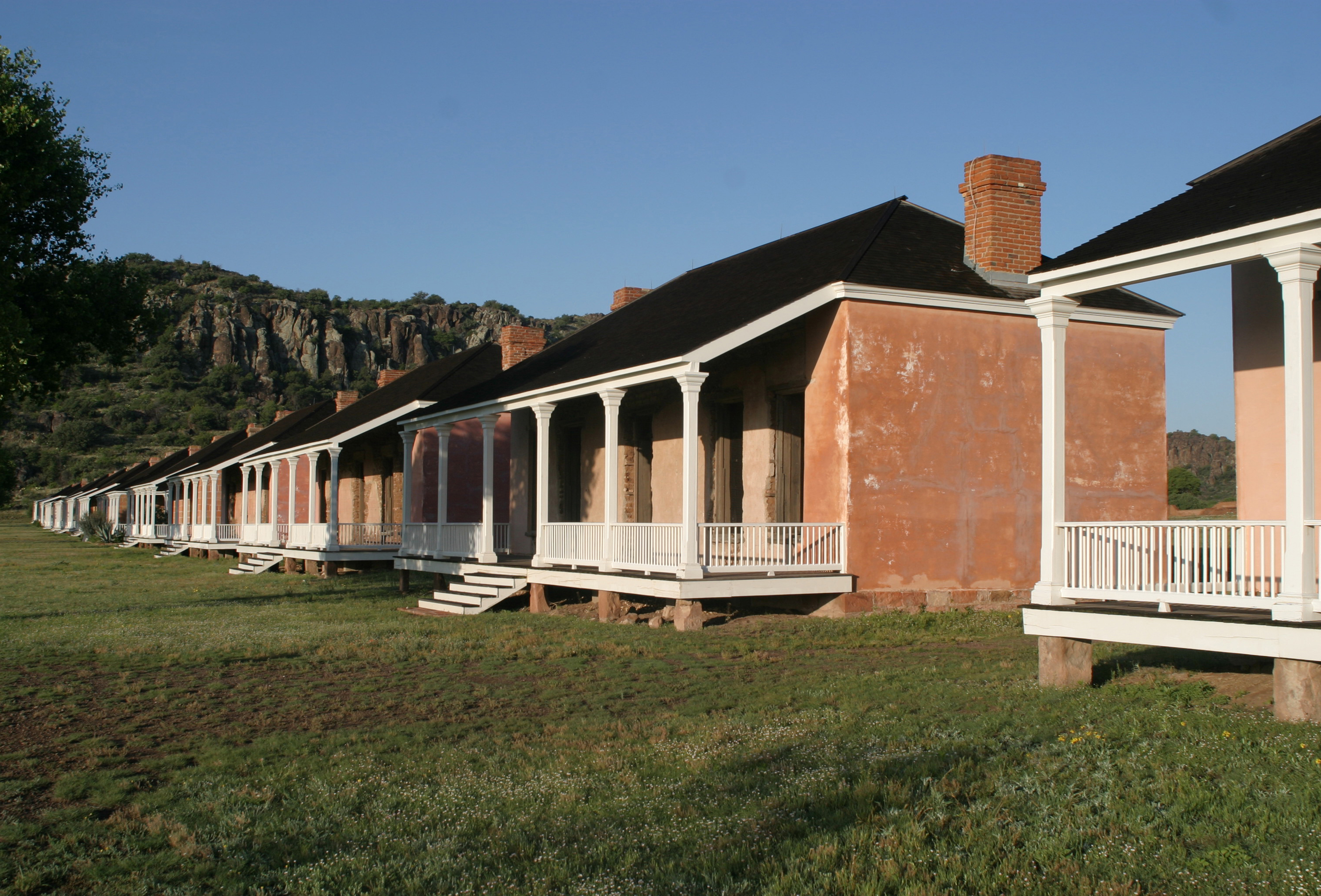
Fort Davis National Historic Site
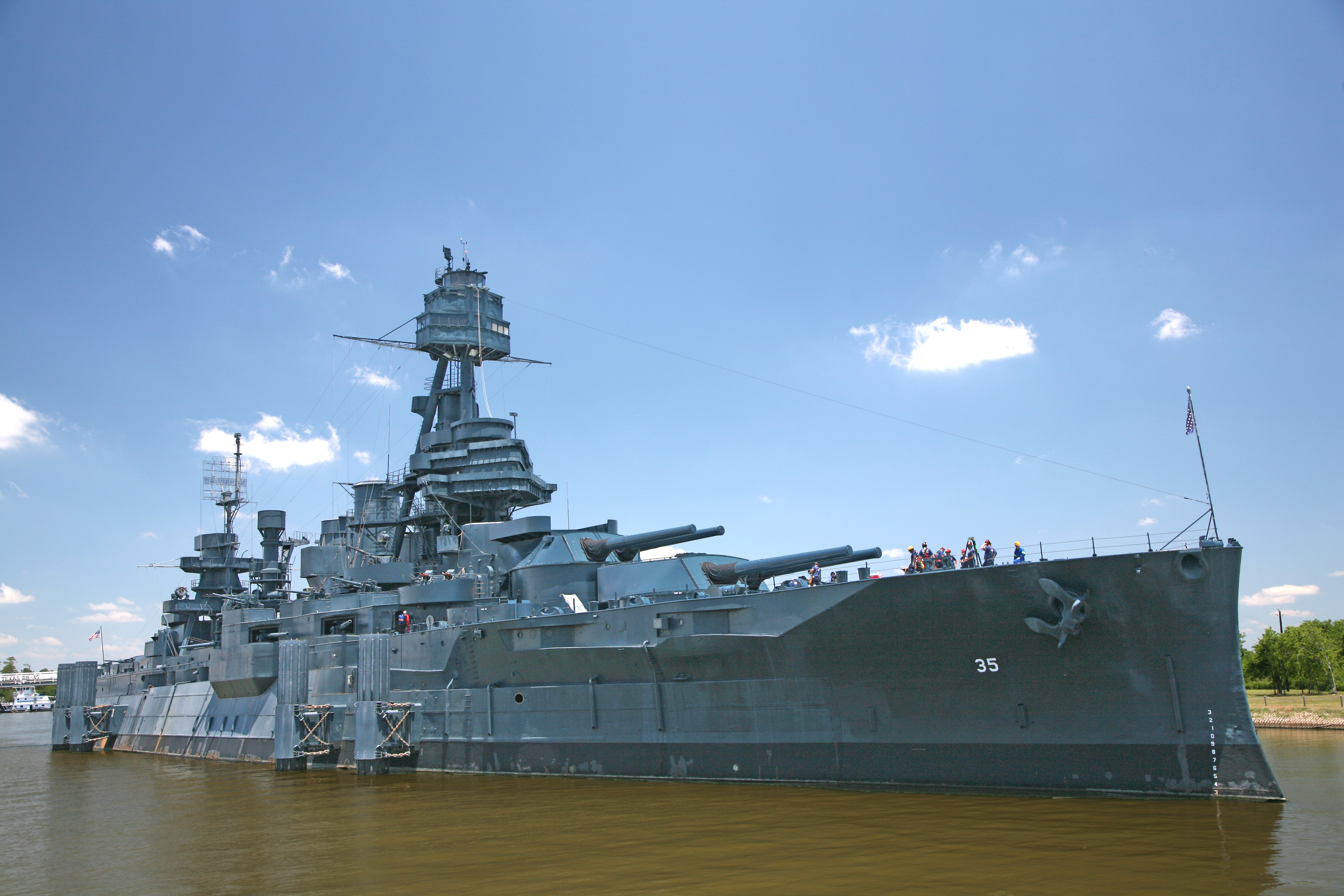
Battleship Texas, La Porte
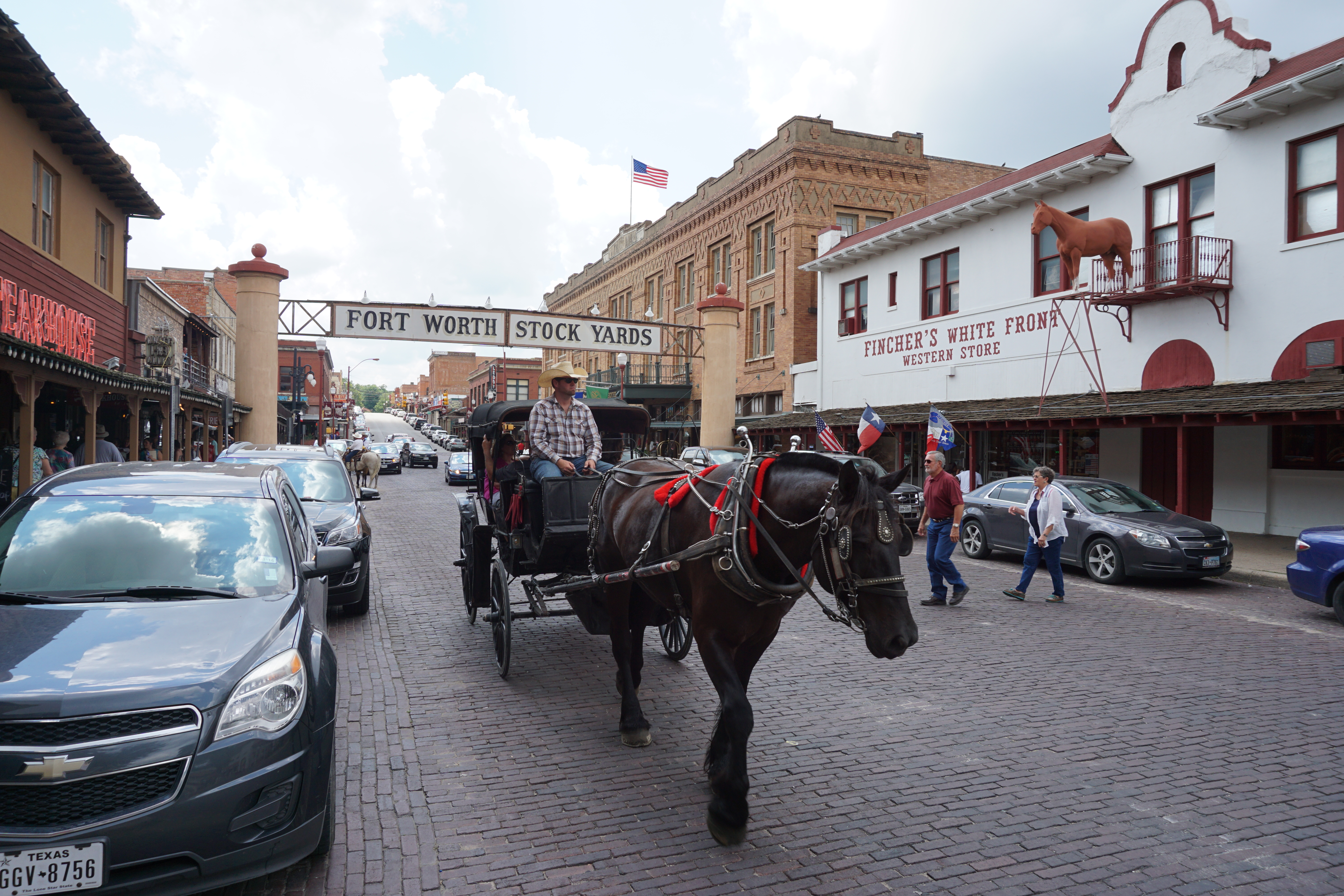
Fort Worth Stockyards Historic District
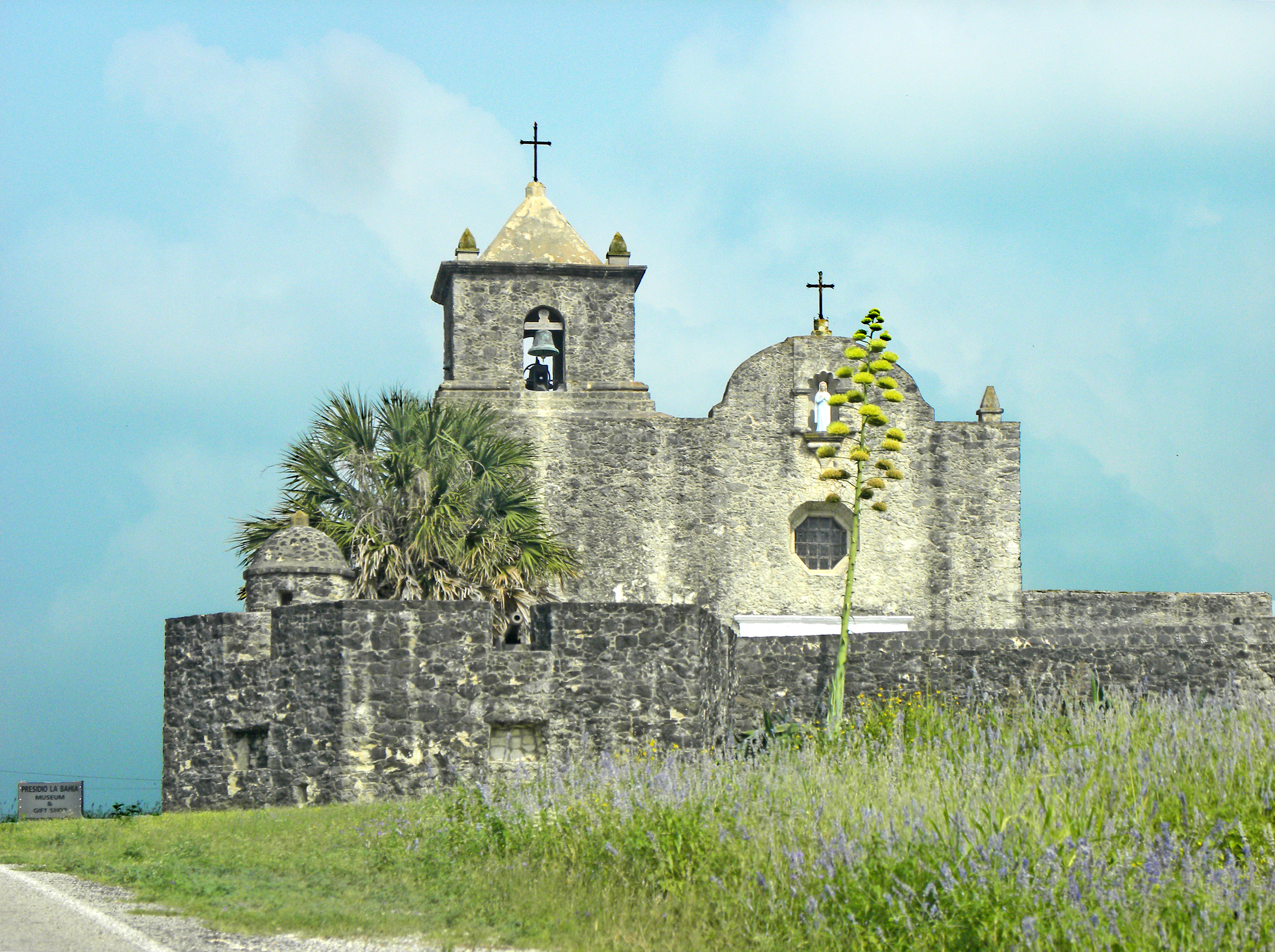
Presidio Nuestra Señora de Loreto de la Bahía, Goliad
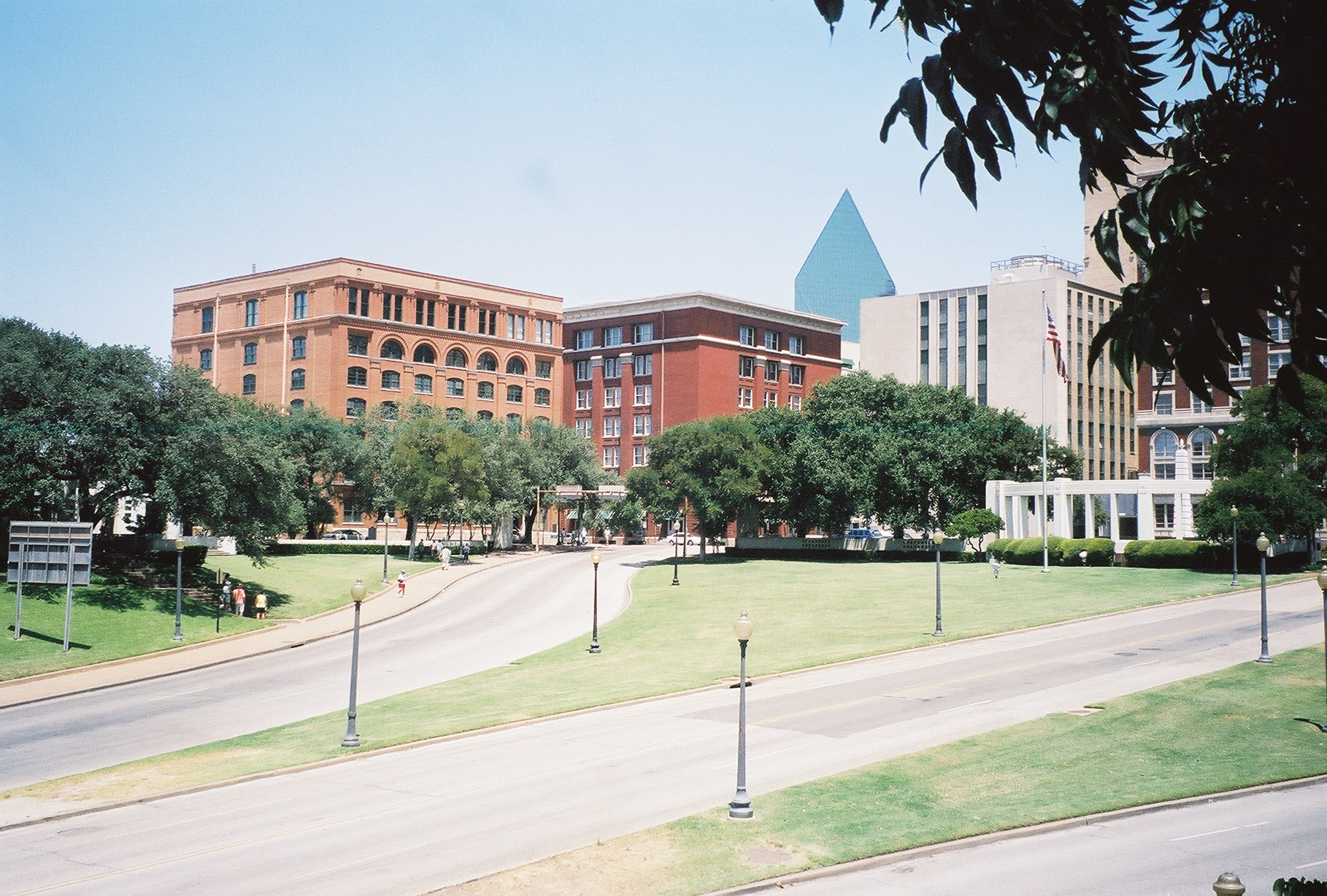
Dealey Plaza Historic District, Dallas
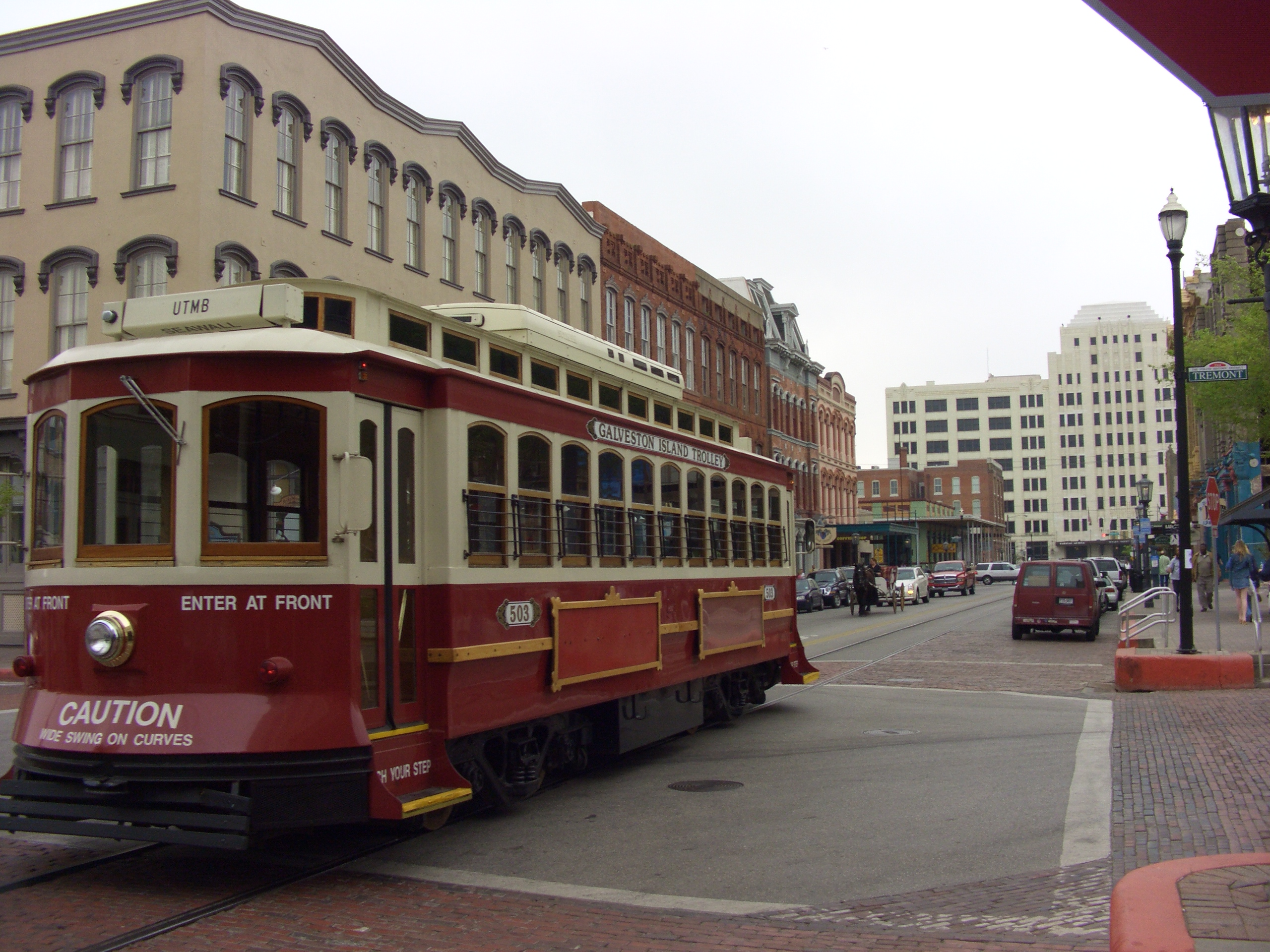
The Strand Historic District, Galveston
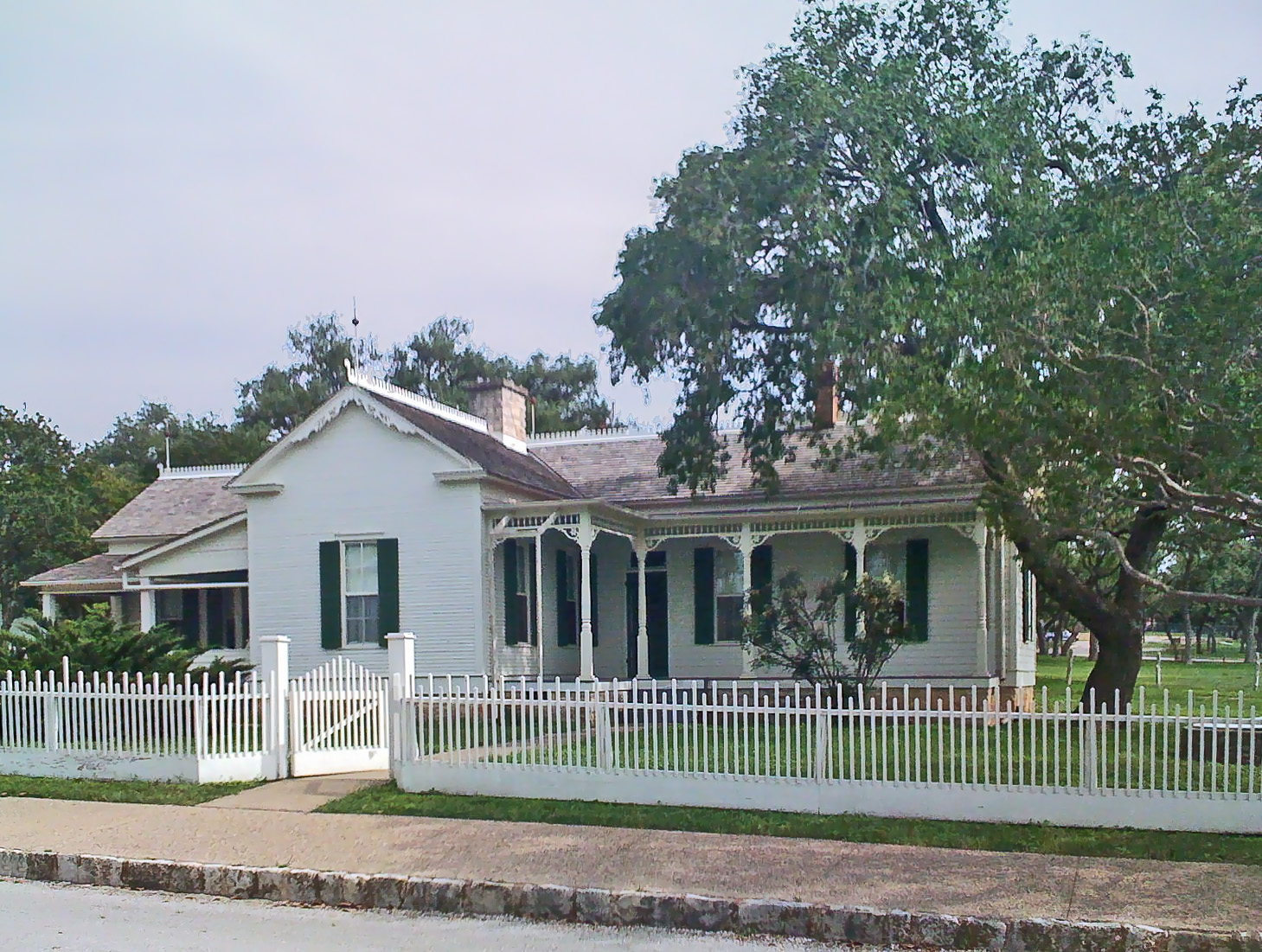
Lyndon Baines Johnson Boyhood Home, Johnson City
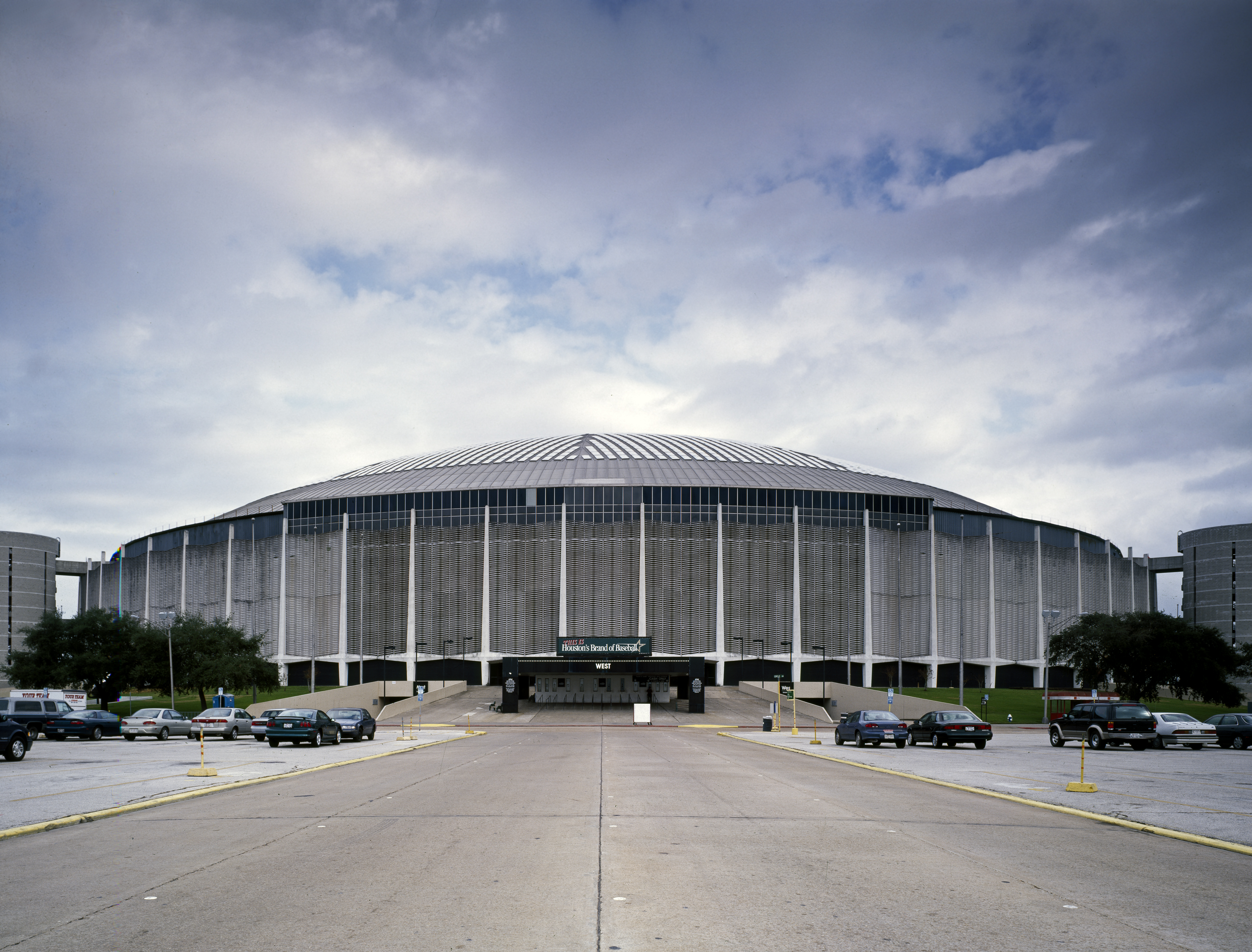
The Astrodome, Houston
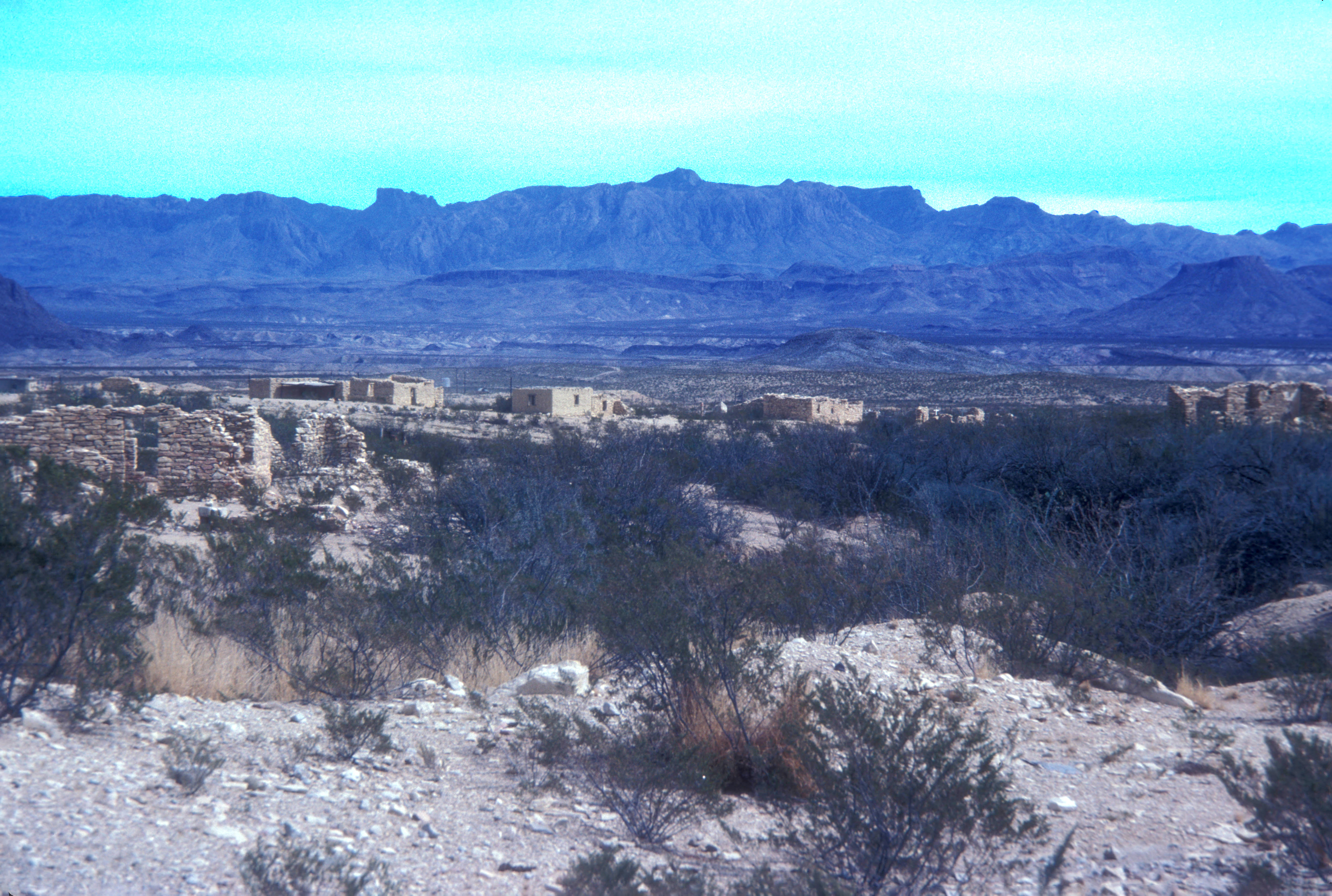
Terlingua Historic District
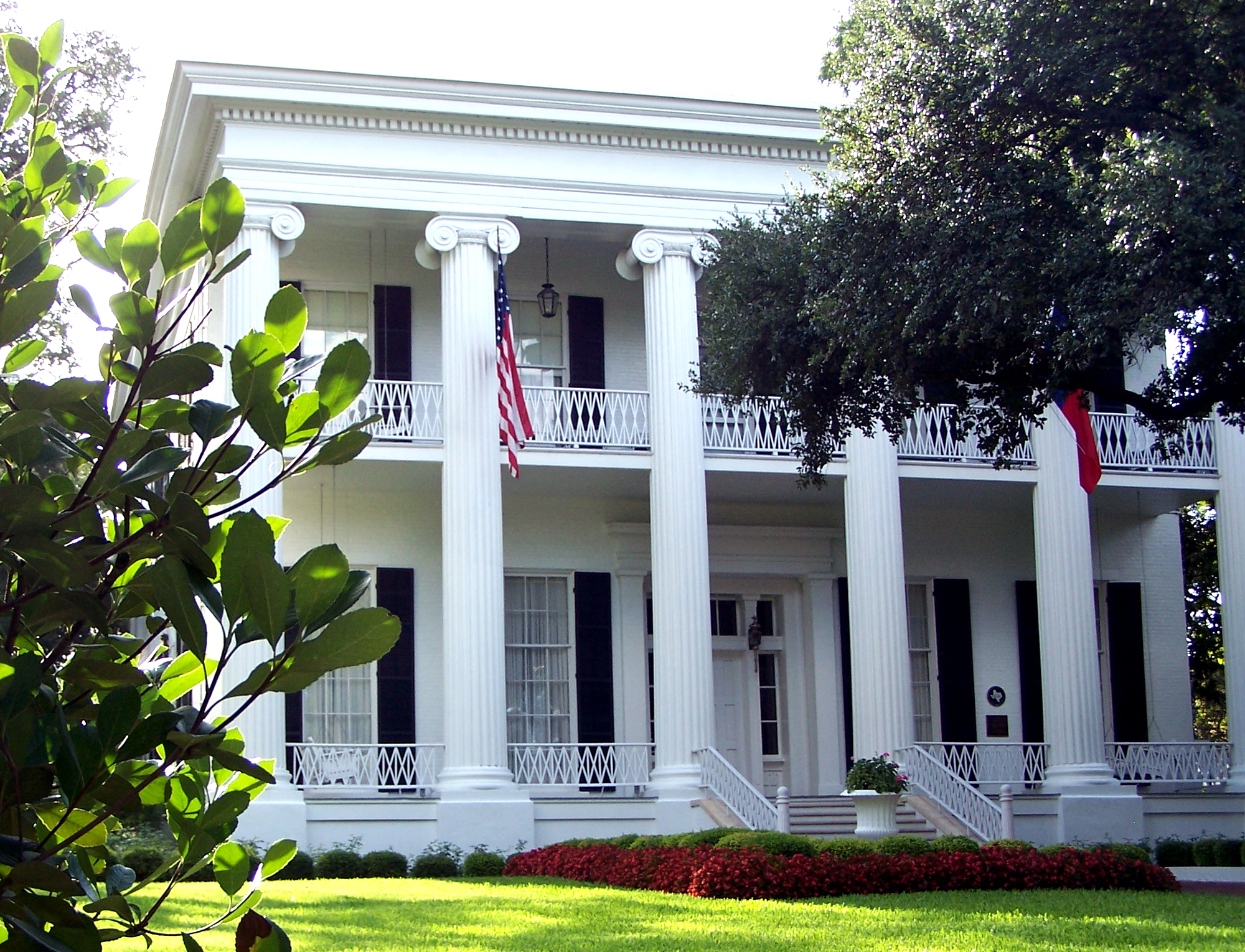
Texas Governor's Mansion, Austin
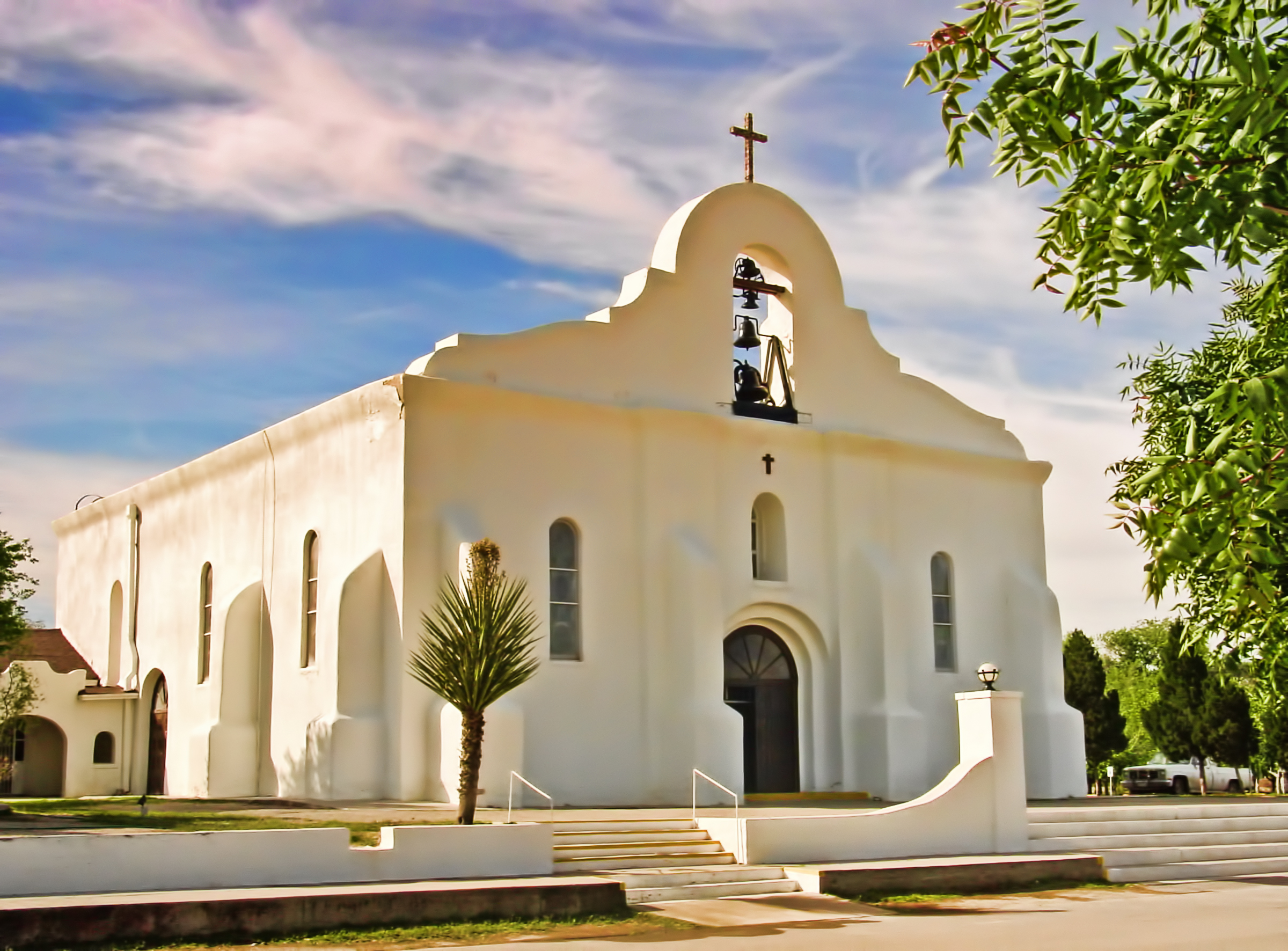
Presidio Chapel of San Elizario
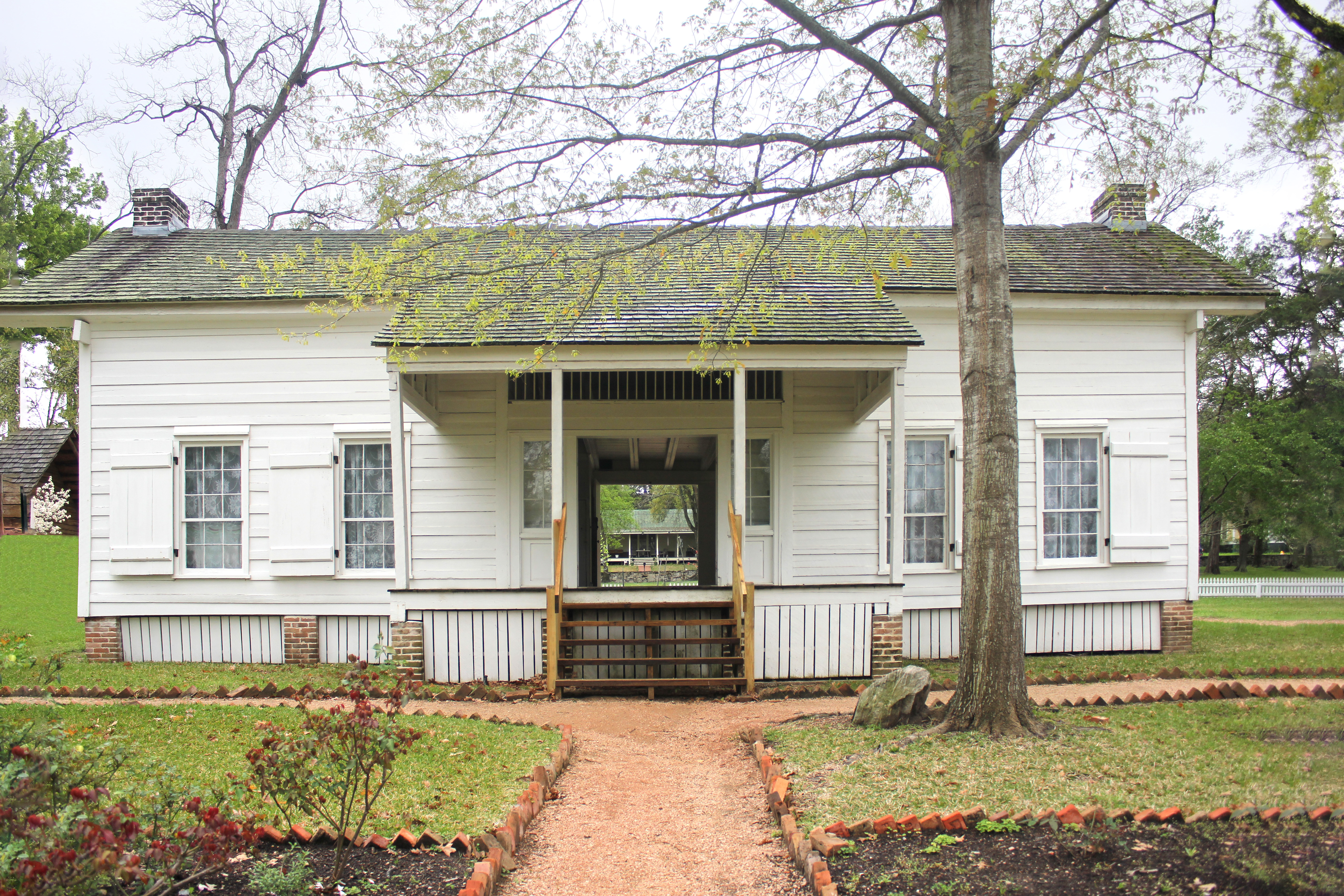
Woodland, home of Sam Houston in Huntsville
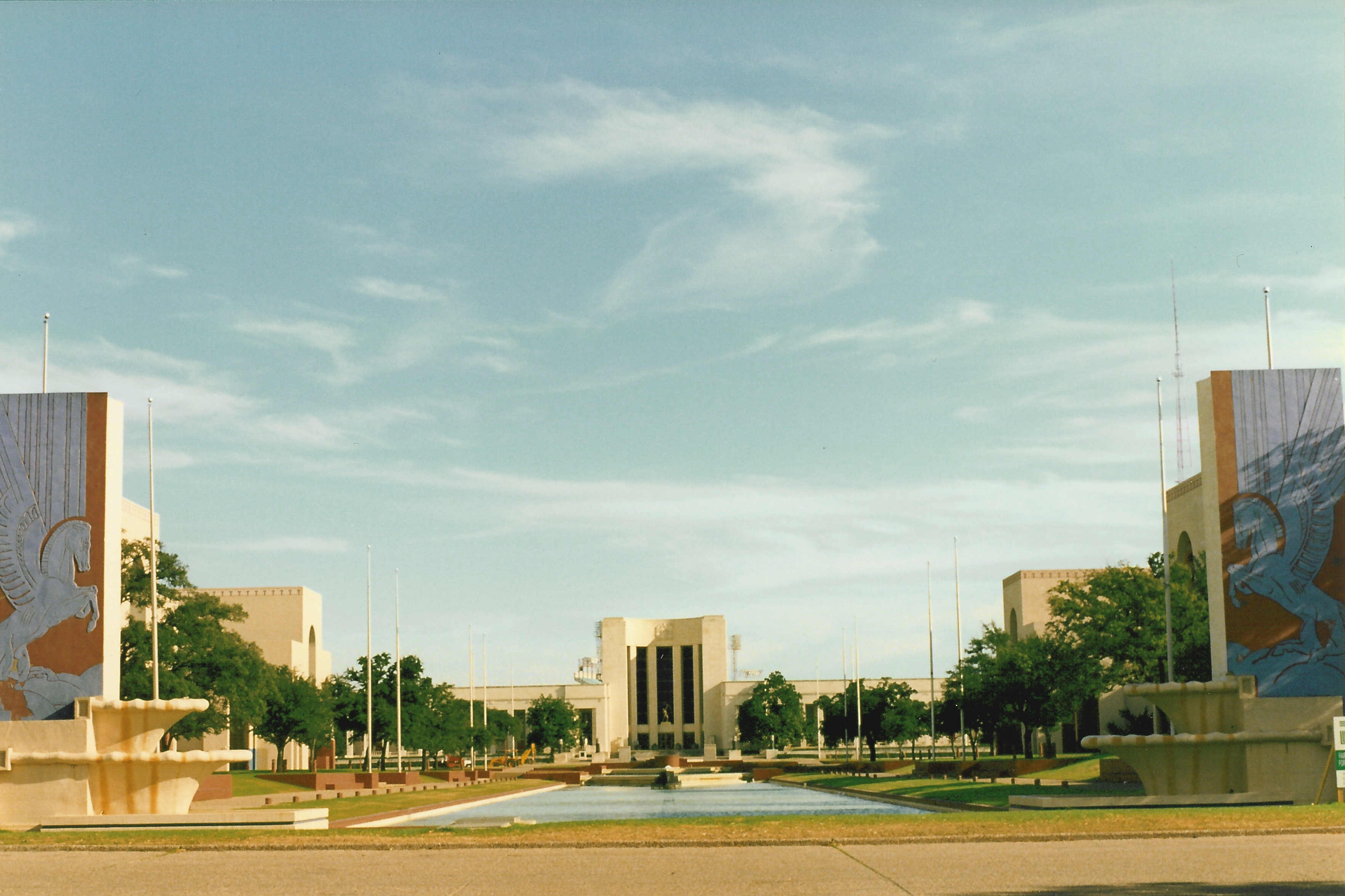
Texas Centennial Exposition Buildings (1936-1937), Fair Park, Dallas
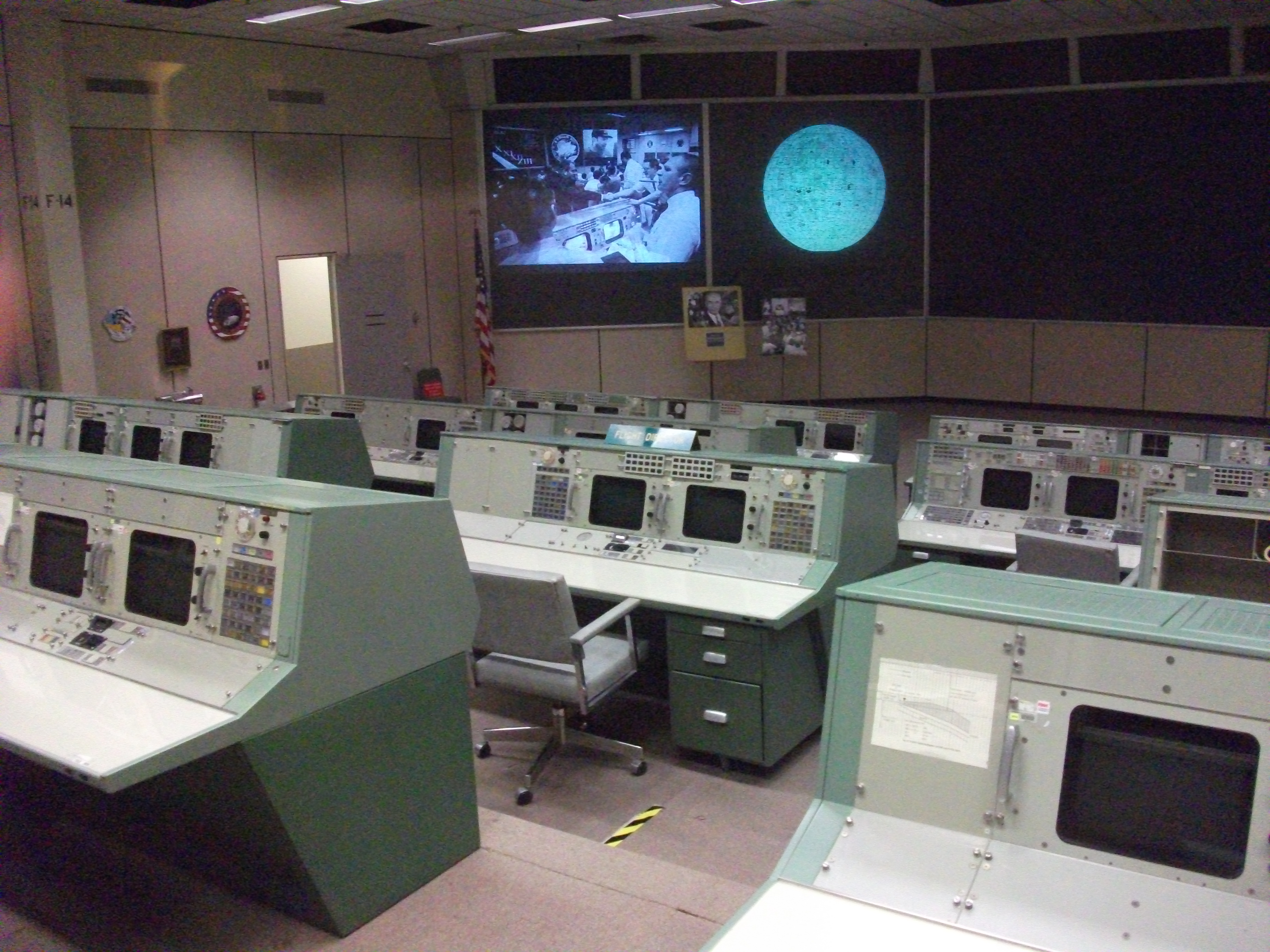
Apollo Mission Control Center, Houston
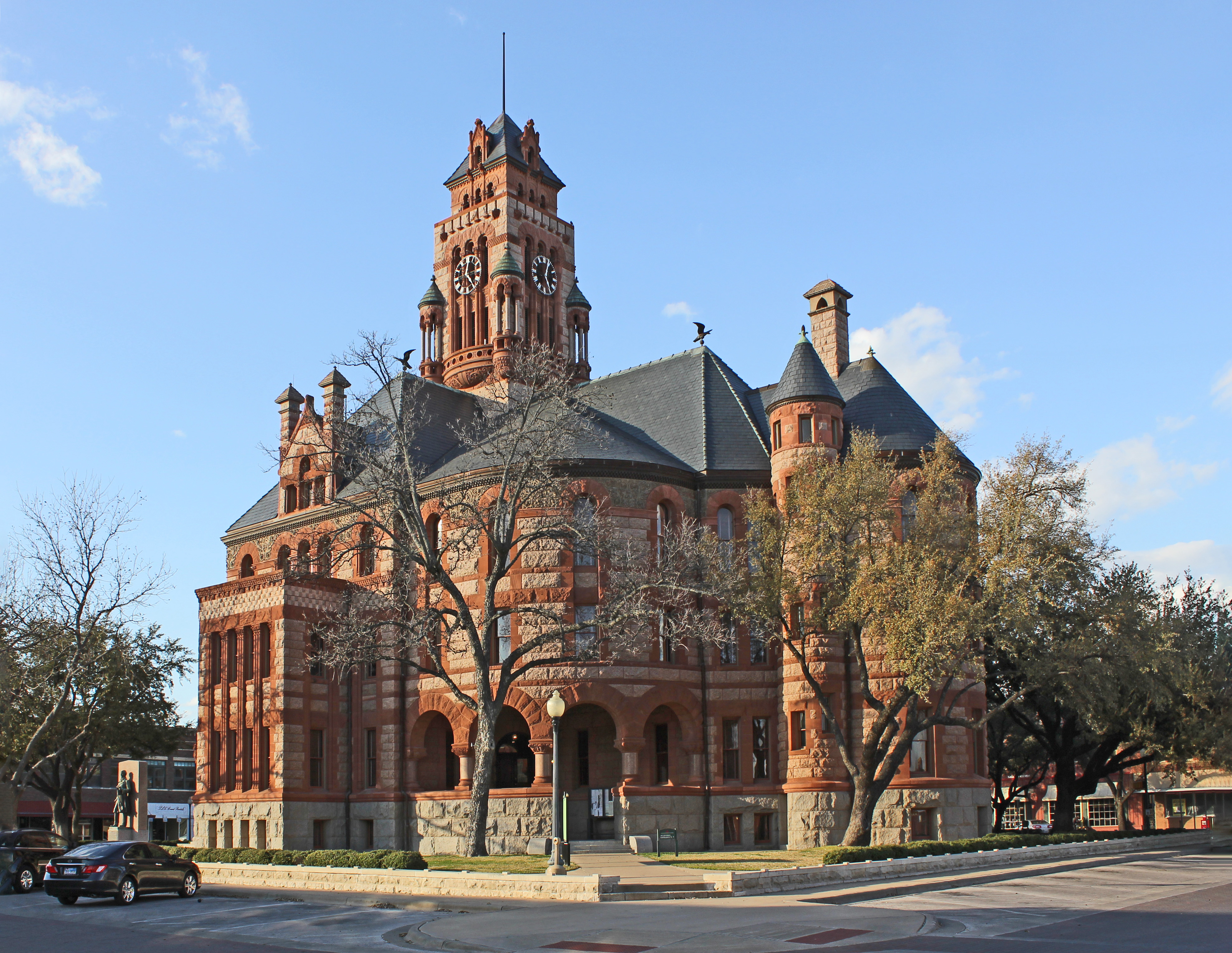
Ellis County Courthouse Historic District, Waxahachie
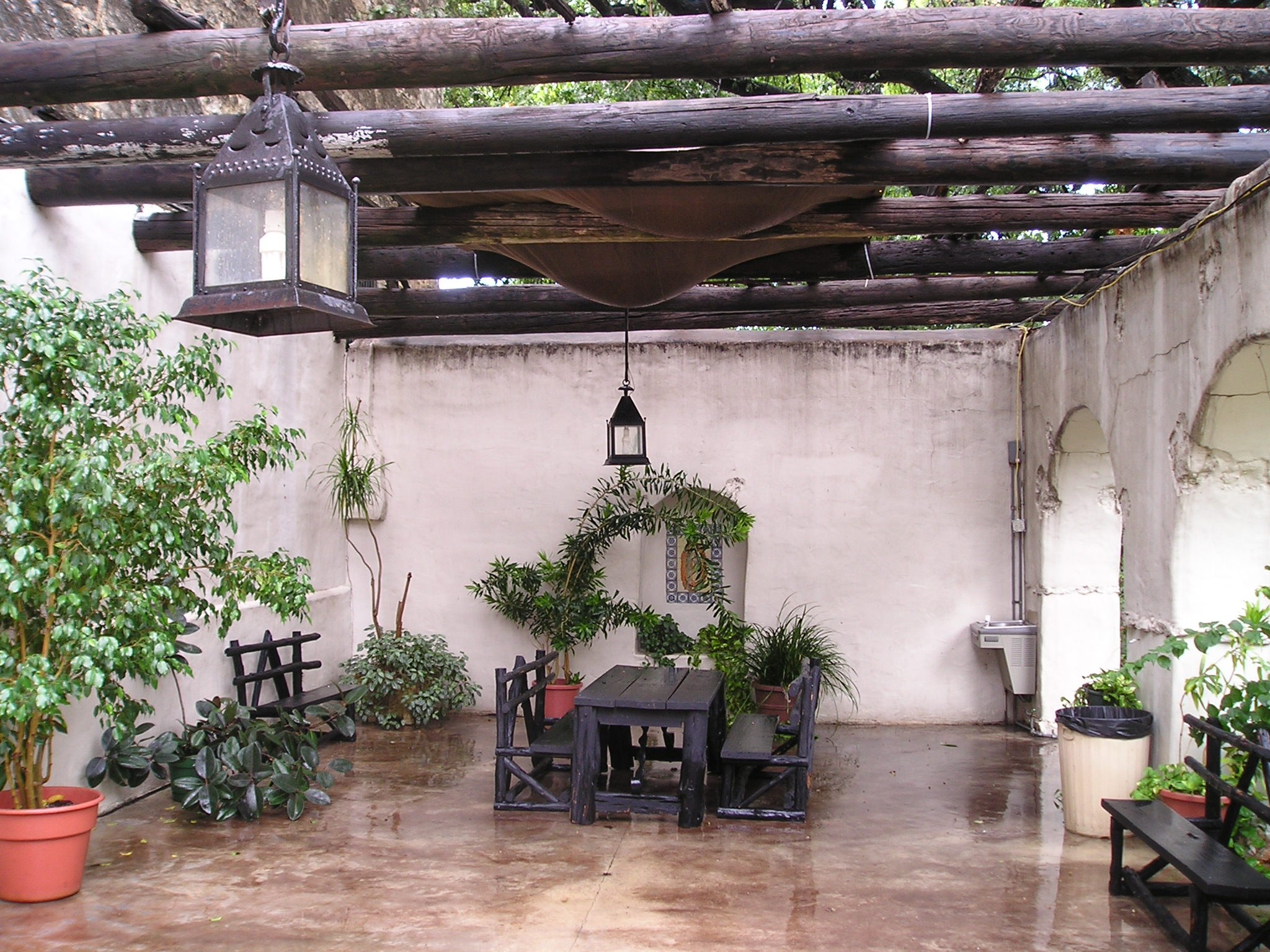
Spanish Governor's Palace, San Antonio
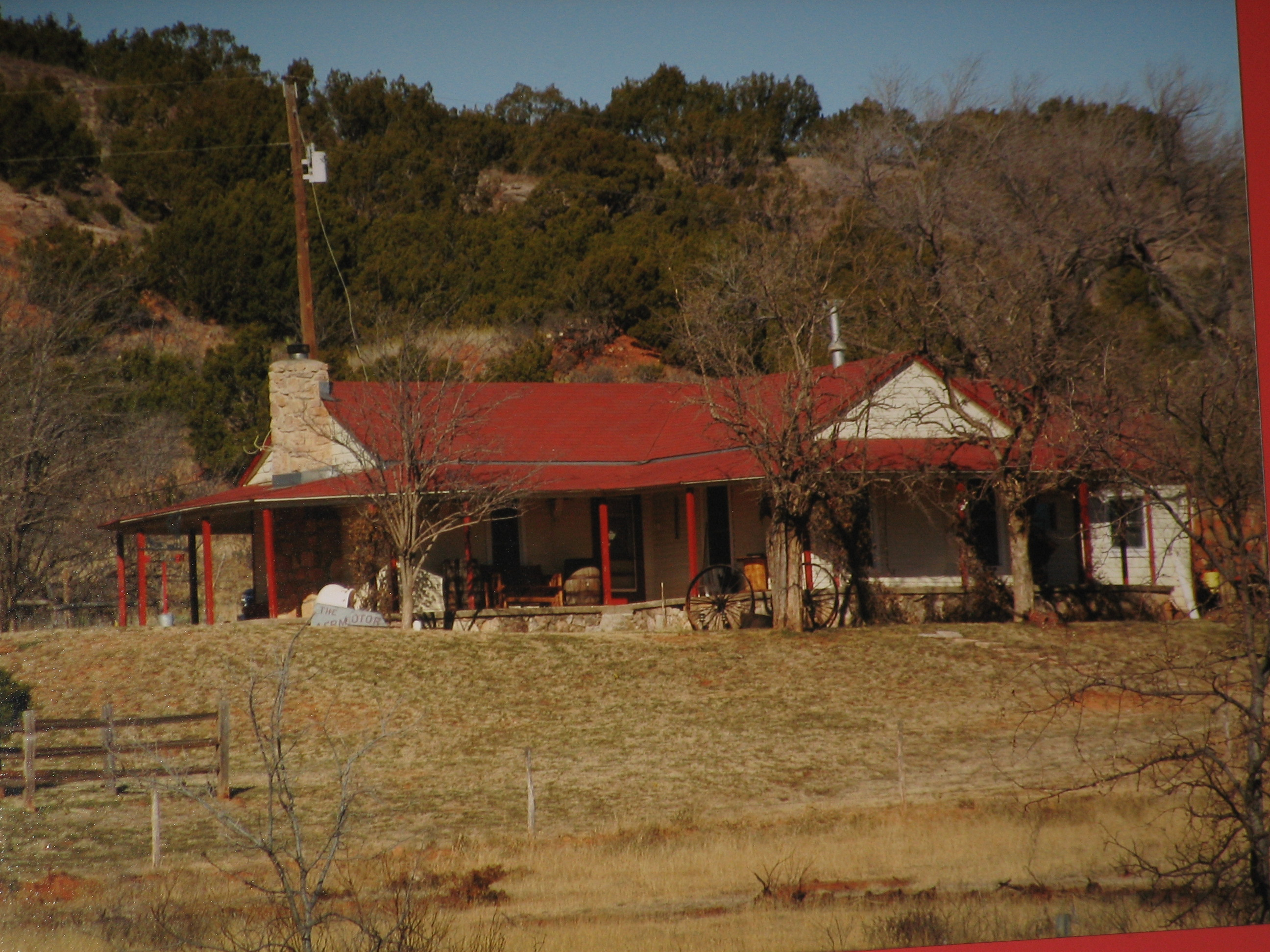
JA Ranch, Claude

	County	# of Sites	# of NHLs	Region
1	Anderson	29	0	Upper East
2	Andrews	1	0	West Texas
3	Angelina	41	0	Southeast
4	Aransas	7	0	South Texas
5	Archer	1	0	Northwest
6	Armstrong	4	1	High Plains
7	Atascosa	3	0	Alamo
8	Austin	10	0	Gulf Coast
9	Bailey	1	0	High Plains
10	Bandera	4	0	Alamo
11	Bastrop	101	1	Capital
12	Baylor	0	0	Northwest
13	Bee	13	0	South Texas
14	Bell	73	0	Central
15	Bexar (San Antonio)	169	8	Alamo
16	Blanco	4	1	Capital
17	Borden	0	0	West Texas
18	Bosque	40	0	Central
19	Bowie	18	0	Upper East
20	Brazoria	13	0	Gulf Coast
21	Brazos	47	0	Central
22	Brewster	18	0	Upper Rio Grande
23	Briscoe	2	0	High Plains
24	Brooks	1	0	South Texas
25	Brown	7	0	Northwest
26	Burleson	3	0	Central
27	Burnet	8	0	Capital
28	Caldwell	7	0	Capital
29	Calhoun	2	0	Alamo
30	Callahan	2	0	Northwest
31	Cameron	37	4	South Texas
32	Camp	1	0	Upper East
33	Carson	4	0	High Plains
34	Cass	5	0	Upper East
35	Castro	1	0	High Plains
36	Chambers	6	0	Gulf Coast
37	Cherokee	5	0	Upper East
38	Childress	1	0	High Plains
39	Clay	2	0	Northwest
40	Cochran	0	0	High Plains
41	Coke	2	0	West Texas
42	Coleman	1	0	Northwest
43	Collin	69	0	Metroplex
44	Collingsworth	2	0	High Plains
45	Colorado	7	0	Gulf Coast
46	Comal	32	0	Alamo
47	Comanche	3	0	Northwest
48	Concho	4	0	West Texas
49	Cooke	8	0	Metroplex
50	Coryell	5	0	Central
51	Cottle	1	0	Northwest
52	Crane	0	0	West Texas
53	Crockett	7	0	West Texas
54	Crosby	0	0	High Plains
55	Culberson	10	0	Upper Rio Grande
56	Dallam	1	0	High Plains
57	Dallas	152	3	Metroplex
58	Dawson	1	0	West Texas
59	Deaf Smith	2	0	High Plains
60	Delta	0	0	Upper East
61	Denton	17	0	Metroplex
62	DeWitt	60	0	Alamo
63	Dickens	1	0	High Plains
64	Dimmit	3	0	South Texas
65	Donley	3	0	High Plains
66	Duval	0	0	South Texas
67	Eastland	2	0	Northwest
68	Ector	1	0	West Texas
69	Edwards	1	0	South Texas
70	El Paso	71	2	Upper Rio Grande
71	Ellis	122	0	Metroplex
72	Erath	8	0	Metroplex
73	Falls	2	0	Central
74	Fannin	9	1	Metroplex
75	Fayette	23	0	Capital
76	Fisher	1	0	Northwest
77	Floyd	3	0	High Plains
78	Foard	0	0	Northwest
79	Fort Bend	9	0	Gulf Coast
80	Franklin	4	0	Upper East
81	Freestone	1	0	Central
82	Frio	1	0	Alamo
83	Gaines	0	0	West Texas
84	Galveston	85	3	Gulf Coast
85	Garza	6	0	High Plains
86	Gillespie	23	1	Alamo
87	Glasscock	1	0	West Texas
88	Goliad	13	1	Alamo
89	Gonzales	12	0	Alamo
90	Gray	8	0	High Plains
91	Grayson	9	0	Metroplex
92	Gregg	9	0	Upper East
93	Grimes	6	0	Central
94	Guadalupe	15	0	Alamo
95	Hale	2	1	High Plains
96	Hall	2	0	High Plains
97	Hamilton	1	0	Central
98	Hansford	1	0	High Plains
99	Hardeman	2	0	Northwest
100	Hardin	3	0	Southeast
101	Harris (Houston)	311	4	Gulf Coast
102	Harrison	18	0	Upper East
103	Hartley	4	0	High Plains
104	Haskell	0	0	Northwest
105	Hays	59	0	Capital
106	Hemphill	1	0	High Plains
107	Henderson	1	0	Upper East
108	Hidalgo	24	0	South Texas
109	Hill	23	0	Central
110	Hockley	0	0	High Plains
111	Hood	4	0	Metroplex
112	Hopkins	1	0	Upper East
113	Houston	7	0	Southeast
114	Howard	6	0	West Texas
115	Hudspeth	88	0	Upper Rio Grande
116	Hunt	8	0	Metroplex
117	Hutchinson	3	0	High Plains
118	Irion	1	0	West Texas
119	Jack	2	1	Northwest
120	Jackson	5	0	Alamo
121	Jasper	7	0	Southeast
122	Jeff Davis	6	1	Upper Rio Grande
123	Jefferson	25	1	Southeast
124	Jim Hogg	0	0	South Texas
125	Jim Wells	1	0	South Texas
126	Johnson	8	0	Metroplex
127	Jones	22	0	Northwest
128	Karnes	3	0	Alamo
129	Kaufman	8	1	Metroplex
130	Kendall	11	0	Alamo
131	Kenedy	2	1	South Texas
132	Kent	1	0	Northwest
133	Kerr	6	0	Alamo
134	Kimble	4	0	West Texas
135	King	0	0	High Plains
136	Kinney	2	0	South Texas
137	Kleberg	7	1	South Texas
138	Knox	1	0	Northwest
139	La Salle	4	0	South Texas
140	Lamar	42	0	Upper East
141	Lamb	0	0	High Plains
142	Lampasas	6	0	Central
143	Lavaca	9	0	Alamo
144	Lee	3	0	Capital
145	Leon	1	0	Central
146	Liberty	6	0	Gulf Coast
147	Limestone	7	0	Central
148	Lipscomb	1	0	High Plains
149	Live Oak	3	0	South Texas
150	Llano	7	0	Capital
151	Loving	1	0	West Texas
152	Lubbock	21	1	High Plains
153	Lynn	1	0	High Plains
154	Madison	1	0	Central
155	Marion	18	0	Upper East
156	Martin	1	0	West Texas
157	Mason	4	0	West Texas
158	Matagorda	15	0	Gulf Coast
159	Maverick	2	0	South Texas
160	McCulloch	2	0	West Texas
161	McLennan	24	0	Central
162	McMullen	1	0	South Texas
163	Medina	9	0	Alamo
164	Menard	3	0	West Texas
165	Midland	5	0	West Texas
166	Milam	5	0	Central
167	Mills	3	0	Central
168	Mitchell	1	0	Northwest
169	Montague	2	0	Northwest
170	Montgomery	2	0	Gulf Coast
171	Moore	0	0	High Plains
172	Morris	1	0	Upper East
173	Motley	1	0	High Plains
174	Nacogdoches	24	0	Southeast
175	Navarro	8	0	Metroplex
176	Newton	6	0	Southeast
177	Nolan	4	0	Northwest
178	Nueces	19	2	South Texas
179	Ochiltree	2	0	High Plains
180	Oldham	12	1	High Plains
181	Orange	7	0	Southeast
182	Palo Pinto	10	0	Metroplex
183	Panola	3	0	Upper East
184	Parker	5	0	Metroplex
185	Parmer	1	0	High Plains
186	Pecos	3	0	West Texas
187	Polk	2	0	Southeast
188	Potter	37	0	High Plains
189	Presidio	13	0	Upper Rio Grande
190	Rains	4	0	Upper East
191	Randall	4	0	High Plains
192	Reagan	1	0	West Texas
193	Real	1	0	South Texas
194	Red River	7	0	Upper East
195	Reeves	0	0	West Texas
196	Refugio	5	0	South Texas
197	Roberts	1	0	High Plains
198	Robertson	5	0	Central
199	Rockwall	2	0	Metroplex
200	Runnels	4	0	Northwest
201	Rusk	7	0	Upper East
202	Sabine	2	0	Southeast
203	San Augustine	9	0	Southeast
204	San Jacinto	2	0	Southeast
205	San Patricio	5	0	South Texas
206	San Saba	3	0	Central
207	Schleicher	1	0	West Texas
208	Scurry	0	0	Northwest
209	Shackelford	5	0	Northwest
210	Shelby	1	0	Southeast
211	Sherman	0	0	High Plains
212	Smith	37	0	Upper East
213	Somervell	4	0	Metroplex
214	Starr	9	1	South Texas
215	Stephens	2	0	Northwest
216	Sterling	1	0	West Texas
217	Stonewall	0	0	Northwest
218	Sutton	3	0	West Texas
219	Swisher	0	0	High Plains
220	Tarrant (Fort Worth)	124	0	Metroplex
221	Taylor	62	0	Northwest
222	Terrell	4	0	West Texas
223	Terry	0	0	High Plains
224	Throckmorton	1	0	Northwest
225	Titus	1	0	Upper East
226	Tom Green	70	1	West Texas
227	Travis	220	2	Capital
228	Trinity	4	0	Southeast
229	Tyler	3	0	Southeast
230	Upshur	2	0	Upper East
231	Upton	0	0	West Texas
232	Uvalde	11	1	South Texas
233	Val Verde	12	1	South Texas
234	Van Zandt	2	0	Upper East
235	Victoria	117	0	Alamo
236	Walker	6	1	Gulf Coast
237	Waller	7	0	Gulf Coast
238	Ward	0	0	West Texas
239	Washington	70	0	Central
240	Webb	10	0	South Texas
241	Wharton	32	0	Gulf Coast
242	Wheeler	4	0	High Plains
243	Wichita	14	0	Northwest
244	Wilbarger	2	0	Northwest
245	Willacy	4	1	South Texas
246	Williamson	75	0	Capital
247	Wilson	6	0	Alamo
248	Winkler	1	0	West Texas
249	Wise	6	0	Metroplex
250	Wood	10	0	Upper East
251	Yoakum	0	0	High Plains
252	Young	6	2	Northwest
253	Zapata	6	1	South Texas
254	Zavala	1	0	South Texas
(duplicates)		(19) (Note: The following sites are listed in multiple counties: Austin and Northwestern Railroad Historic District-Fairland to Llano (Burnet and Llano); Bartlett Commercial Historic District (Bell and Williamson); Butterfield Mail Corridor (Culberson and Hudspeth); Cuero I Archeological District (DeWitt and Gonzales); Enchanted Rock Archeological District (Gillespie and Llano); King Ranch (Kenedy, Kleberg, Nueces and Willacy); Lyndon B. Johnson National Historical Park (Blanco and Gillespie); Mansfield Cut Underwater Archeological District (Kenedy and Willacy); Port Arthur-Orange Bridge (Jefferson and Orange); Regency Suspension Bridge (Mills and San Saba); Riverside Swinging Bridge (Trinity and Walker); State Highway 3-A Bridge at Cibolo Creek (Bexar and Guadalupe); State Highway 19 Bridge at Trinity River (Trinity and Walker); State Highway 29 Bridge at the Colorado River (Burnet and Llano); State Highway 34 Bridge at the Trinity River (Ellis and Kaufman); US 190 Bridge at the Colorado River (Lampasas and San Saba); US 190 Bridge at the Neches River (Jasper and Tyler))		
Totals:		3,585	50	

== See also ==
- List of bridges on the National Register of Historic Places in Texas
- List of historical societies in Texas
- List of National Historic Landmarks in Texas
- Recorded Texas Historic Landmark
