= National Register of Historic Places listings in Fisher County, Texas =

Location of Fisher County in Texas

This is a list of the National Register of Historic Places listings in Fisher County, Texas.

This is intended to be a complete list of properties listed on the National Register of Historic Places in Fisher County, Texas. There is one property listed on the National Register in the county.

This National Park Service list is complete through NPS recent listings posted March 21, 2025.

== Current listings ==
	Name on the Register	Image	Date listed	Location	City or town	Description
1	Foy Steadman Site	Foy Steadman Site	March 11, 1971 (#71000932)	Address restricted	Noodle	

== See also ==
- National Register of Historic Places listings in Texas
- Recorded Texas Historic Landmarks in Fisher County
