= National Register of Historic Places listings in Wilbarger County, Texas =

Location of Wilbarger County in Texas

This is a list of the National Register of Historic Places listings in Wilbarger County, Texas.

This is intended to be a complete list of properties listed on the National Register of Historic Places in Wilbarger County, Texas. There are two properties listed on the National Register in the county. One property is also a Recorded Texas Historic Landmark.

This National Park Service list is complete through NPS recent listings posted March 21, 2025.

== Current listings ==
The locations of National Register properties may be seen in a mapping service provided.

	Name on the Register	Image	Date listed	Location	City or town	Description
1	Doan's Adobe House	Doan's Adobe House	February 8, 1979 (#79003023)	E of Odell off U.S. 283; 34°20′37″N 99°15′21″W	Doans	Recorded Texas Historic Landmark
2	Plaza Theater	Plaza Theater	October 6, 2023 (#100009409)	1701-1717 Cumberland St. 34°09′12″N 99°17′00″W	Vernon	

== See also ==
- National Register of Historic Places listings in Texas
- Recorded Texas Historic Landmarks in Wilbarger County
