= National Register of Historic Places listings in Bailey County, Texas =

Location of Bailey County in Texas

This is a list of the National Register of Historic Places listings in Bailey County, Texas.

This is intended to be a complete list of properties listed on the National Register of Historic Places in Bailey County, Texas. There is one property listed.

This National Park Service list is complete through NPS recent listings posted June 26, 2026.

== Current listings ==
The locations of National Register properties may be seen in a mapping service provided.

	Name on the Register	Image	Date listed	Location	City or town	Description
1	Bailey County Courthouse	Bailey County Courthouse	June 24, 2026 (#100013170)	300 S. 1st Street; 34°13′27″N 102°43′33″W	Muleshoe	

== See also ==
- National Register of Historic Places listings in Texas
- Recorded Texas Historic Landmarks in Bailey County
