= National Register of Historic Places listings in Castro County, Texas =

Location of Childress County in Texas

This is a list of the National Register of Historic Places listings in Castro County, Texas.

This is intended to be a complete list of properties and districts listed on the National Register of Historic Places in Castro County, Texas. There is one property listed on the National Register in the county.

This National Park Service list is complete through NPS recent listings posted March 20, 2026.

== Current listings ==
The locations of National Register properties and districts may be seen in a mapping service provided.

	Name on the Register	Image	Date listed	Location	City or town	Description
1	Castro County Courthouse	Castro County Courthouse	March 19, 2026 (#100012830)	100 E. Bedford Street; 34°33′03″N 102°18′42″W	Dimmitt	

== See also ==
- National Register of Historic Places listings in Texas
- Recorded Texas Historic Landmarks in Castro County
