= National Register of Historic Places listings in Parmer County, Texas =

Location of Parmer County in Texas

This is a list of the National Register of Historic Places listings in Parmer County, Texas.

This is intended to be a complete list of properties and districts listed on the National Register of Historic Places in Parmer County, Texas. There is one individual property listed on the National Register in the county.

This National Park Service list is complete through NPS recent listings posted March 21, 2025.

== Current listings ==
The locations of National Register properties and districts may be seen in a mapping service provided.

	Name on the Register	Image	Date listed	Location	City or town	Description
1	Parmer County Courthouse	Parmer County Courthouse	March 6, 2019 (#100003490)	401 3rd St. 34°23′05″N 103°02′22″W	Farwell	

== See also ==
- National Register of Historic Places listings in Texas
- Recorded Texas Historic Landmarks in Parmer County
