= National Register of Historic Places listings in the Metroplex region of Texas: Other =

This page is one of two listing the National Register of Historic Places listings in Texas' Metroplex.

The Metroplex region is an area of 19 counties defined by the Texas Comptroller for economic reporting, as mapped here. It includes all of the Dallas-Fort Worth metroplex by most definitions; the U.S. Office of Management and Budget-defined statistical area of Dallas–Fort Worth–Arlington includes just 11 counties. (Note: The OMB-defined Dallas–Fort Worth–Arlington statistical area omits three counties to the north (Cooke, Fannin, Grayson) and five to the southwest (Erath, Hood, Palo Pinto, Parker, Somervell).) The region included 2020 population of more than 8 million, or 27.6 percent of Texas' population, with the Dallas-Fort Worth-Arlington MSA having 94.9 percent of the Metroplex's population.

Due to size limitations, the entire Metroplex region cannot be shown. This shows the ring of all other counties around Dallas and Tarrant (Fort Worth). For Dallas and Tarrant together, please see National Register of Historic Places listings in the Metroplex region of Texas: Dallas and Tarrant counties.

To see all locations together in a map, click on "Map all coordinates using OpenSourceMap" at right.
