= National Register of Historic Places listings in Cottle County, Texas =

Location of Cottle County in Texas

This is a list of the National Register of Historic Places listings in Cottle County, Texas.

This is intended to be a complete list of properties and districts listed on the National Register of Historic Places in Cottle County, Texas. There is one district listed on the National Register in the county. The district includes one property that is both a State Antiquities Landmark and a Recorded Texas Historic Landmark.

This National Park Service list is complete through NPS recent listings posted March 21, 2025.

== Current listings ==
The locations of National Register properties and districts may be seen in a mapping service provided.

	Name on the Register	Image	Date listed	Location	City or town	Description
1	Cottle County Courthouse Historic District	Cottle County Courthouse Historic District	September 10, 2004 (#04000948)	Roughly bounded by N. 7th, N. 10th, Garrett and Easly Sts. 34°00′50″N 100°18′05″W	Paducah	State Antiquities Landmark, Recorded Texas Historic Landmark

== See also ==
- National Register of Historic Places listings in Texas
- Recorded Texas Historic Landmarks in Cottle County
