= National Register of Historic Places listings in Montague County, Texas =

Location of Montague County in Texas

This is a list of the National Register of Historic Places listings in Montague County, Texas.

This is intended to be a complete list of properties listed on the National Register of Historic Places in Montague County, Texas. There are two properties listed on the National Register in the county. One property contains two Recorded Texas Historic Landmarks.

This National Park Service list is complete through NPS recent listings posted March 21, 2025.

== Current listings ==
The publicly disclosed locations of National Register properties may be seen in a mapping service provided.

	Name on the Register	Image	Date listed	Location	City or town	Description
1	Montague County Courthouse and Jail	Montague County Courthouse and Jail	July 24, 2017 (#100001377)	101 E. Franklin St. 33°39′52″N 97°43′12″W	Montague	Includes Recorded Texas Historic Landmarks
2	Spanish Fort Site	Spanish Fort Site	April 14, 1975 (#75002000)	Address restricted	Spanish Fort	

== Former listings ==
	Name on the Register	Image	Date listed	Date removed	Location	City or town	Description
1	Fort Worth and Denver City Depot		September 14, 1972 (#72001545)	November 17, 1975	Jct. of US 81 and FM 3404	Bowie	Destroyed by arsonist in January 1974.

== See also ==
- National Register of Historic Places listings in Texas
- Recorded Texas Historic Landmarks in Montague County
