= St. John's Methodist Church =

St. John's Methodist Church may refer to:

- St. John's Methodist Church (Georgetown, Delaware)
- St. John's Methodist Church (Davenport, Iowa)
- St. John's Methodist Church (Shelbyville, Kentucky)
- St. John's Methodist Church, Arbroath
- Saint John's Methodist Church (Texas)
