= Throckmorton County Courthouse and Jail =

- U.S. National Register of Historic Places
- Texas State Antiquities Landmark
- Recorded Texas Historic Landmark
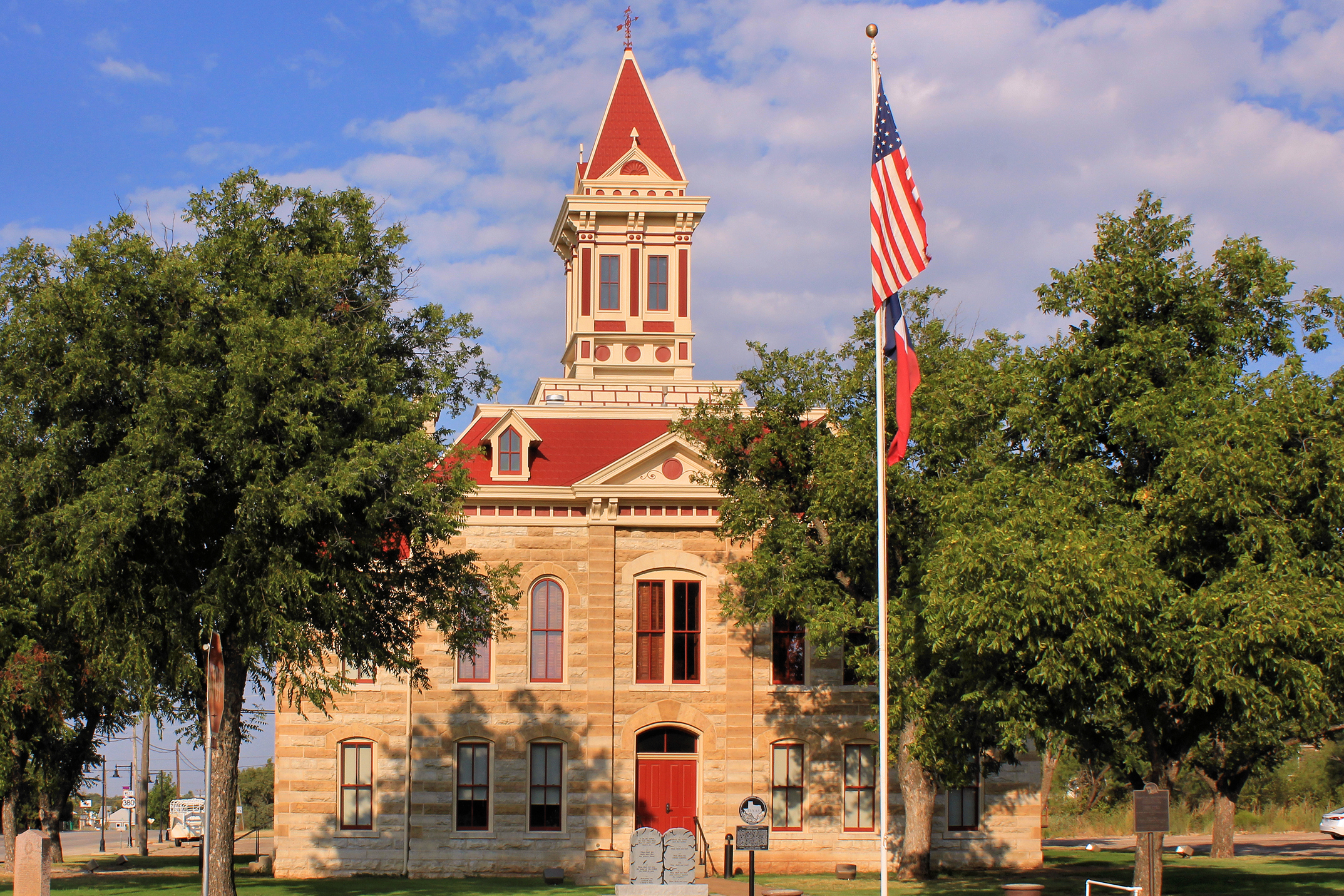
- Throckmorton County Courthouse in 2015

- Location within Texas Location within the United States
- Location: 121 N. Minter Ave., Throckmorton, Texas
- Coordinates: 33°10′44″N 99°10′39″W
- Area: 0.1 acres (0.040 ha)
- Built: 1890–1891 (courthouse), 1893 (jail)
- Built by: J.L. Dewees, Jacob Rath (courthouse); Pauly Jail Building & Manufacturing (jail)
- Architect: Martin, Byrnes & Johnston
- Architectural style: Italianate
- NRHP reference No.: 78002987
- TSAL No.: 8200000591
- RTHL No.: 15081

Significant dates
- Added to NRHP: August 10, 1978
- Designated TSAL: January 1, 1981
- Designated RTHL: 2008

The Throckmorton County Courthouse and Jail, in Throckmorton, Texas, was listed on the National Register of Historic Places in 1978. It is also a State Antiquities Landmark and a Recorded Texas Historic Landmark.

== History ==
The courthouse was designed by architects Martin, Byrnes & Johnston and was built in 1890, when the county had only 124 residents. The laying of the cornerstone took place on August 30, 1890. The jail was built in 1893 by Pauly Jail Building & Manufacturing of St. Louis.

In 1938, the building was substantially altered. A restoration was started in 2010 and completed in 2015. On this occasion, a large part of the 1930s modifications were undone to restore the original structure: KBL Restoration (a company from Hallsville) carried out extensive work on the building, including the reconstruction of the wooden cupola and the roof as well as the restoration of the doors and windows. Some modern amenities were also added for accessibility. The restored courthouse was rededicated on March 12, 2015.

== Structure ==
The courthouse is a two-story building with walls of light brown and grey sandstone.

== See also ==
- National Register of Historic Places listings in Throckmorton County, Texas
- Recorded Texas Historic Landmarks in Throckmorton County
- List of county courthouses in Texas
