= National Register of Historic Places listings in Nolan County, Texas =

Location of Nolan County in Texas

This is a list of the National Register of Historic Places listings in Nolan County, Texas.

This is intended to be a complete list of properties and districts listed on the National Register of Historic Places in Nolan County, Texas. There are one district and three individual properties listed on the National Register in the county. Two properties are also Recorded Texas Historic Landmarks.

This National Park Service list is complete through NPS recent listings posted March 21, 2025.

== Current listings ==
The locations of National Register properties and districts may be seen in a mapping service provided.

| | Name on the Register | Image | Date listed | Location | City or town | Description |
|---|---|---|---|---|---|---|
| 1 | First National Bank Building | First National Bank Building | May 26, 1983 (#83003154) | 101 E. 3rd St. 32°28′16″N 100°24′30″W | Sweetwater | Part of Sweetwater Commercial Historic District |
| 2 | I.M. and Margaret Newman House | I.M. and Margaret Newman House | August 14, 2003 (#03000771) | 309 Ragland St. 32°28′29″N 100°24′09″W | Sweetwater | Recorded Texas Historic Landmark |
| 3 | R. A. Ragland Building | R. A. Ragland Building | May 14, 1979 (#79003001) | 113-117 3rd St. 32°28′17″N 100°24′29″W | Sweetwater | Recorded Texas Historic Landmark; part of Sweetwater Commercial Historic District |
| 4 | Sweetwater Commercial Historic District | Sweetwater Commercial Historic District | June 7, 1984 (#84001915) | Roughly between 1st and 5th, and Ash and Texas and Pacific RR tracks 32°27′48″N 100°24′37″W | Sweetwater | |

== See also ==
- National Register of Historic Places listings in Texas
- Recorded Texas Historic Landmarks in Nolan County
