= Noodle Creek =

Stream in Texas

Coordinates: 32.65834°N 100.00836°W

Noodle Creek is a stream in the U.S. state of Texas. Noodle Creek flows for 31 miles (50 km) before it joins the Clear Fork Brazos River.

According to tradition, Noodle Creek was named for the fact it often runs dry, "noodle" being local slang meaning "nothing".
