= National Register of Historic Places listings in Runnels County, Texas =

Location of Runnels County in Texas

This is a list of the National Register of Historic Places listings in Runnels County, Texas.

This is intended to be a complete list of properties listed on the National Register of Historic Places in Runnels County, Texas. There are four properties listed on the National Register in the county. Two of these are Recorded Texas Historic Landmarks including one that is also a State Antiquities Landmark.

This National Park Service list is complete through NPS recent listings posted July 18, 2025.

== Current listings ==
The locations of National Register properties may be seen in a mapping service provided.

	Name on the Register	Image	Date listed	Location	City or town	Description
1	Ballinger Carnegie Library	Ballinger Carnegie Library	June 18, 1975 (#75002002)	204 N. 8th St. 31°44′23″N 99°56′59″W	Ballinger	State Antiquities Landmark, Recorded Texas Historic Landmark
2	Edwin and Hattie Day House	Edwin and Hattie Day House	January 3, 1985 (#85000047)	302 N. Broadway; 31°44′31″N 99°56′54″W	Ballinger	
3	J. Thiele Building	J. Thiele Building	June 29, 1976 (#76002061)	Robinson and 2nd Sts. 31°35′54″N 100°11′00″W	Miles	Recorded Texas Historic Landmark
4	Van Pelt House	Van Pelt House	December 3, 1980 (#80004146)	209 10th St. 31°44′19″N 99°57′08″W	Ballinger	

== See also ==
- National Register of Historic Places listings in Texas
- Recorded Texas Historic Landmarks in Runnels County
