= National Register of Historic Places listings in Hood County, Texas =

Location of Hood County in Texas

This is a list of the National Register of Historic Places listings in Hood County, Texas.

This is intended to be a complete list of properties and districts listed on the National Register of Historic Places in Hood County, Texas. There are one district and 3 individual properties listed on the National Register in the county. The district contains a State Antiquities Landmark district and several Recorded Texas Historic Landmarks. Both individually listed properties are also Recorded Texas Historic Landmarks.

This National Park Service list is complete through NPS recent listings posted March 21, 2025.

== Current listings ==
The locations of National Register properties and districts may be seen in a mapping service provided.

	Name on the Register	Image	Date listed	Location	City or town	Description
1	Baker-Carmichael House	Baker-Carmichael House	December 6, 2005 (#05001401)	226 E. Pearl St. 32°26′32″N 97°47′08″W	Granbury	Recorded Texas Historic Landmark
2	Granbury Elementary School	Granbury Elementary School	January 13, 2022 (#100007355)	126 North Morgan St. 32°26′34″N 97°47′39″W	Granbury	
3	Hood County Courthouse Historic District	Hood County Courthouse Historic District	June 5, 1974 (#74002080)	Courthouse Sq., bounded by Bridge, Pearl, and Houston Sts. 32°26′33″N 97°47′13″W	Granbury	Includes State Antiquities Landmark district, numerous Recorded Texas Historic Landmarks
4	Wright-Henderson-Duncan House	Wright-Henderson-Duncan House	December 19, 1978 (#78002956)	703 Spring St. 32°26′07″N 97°47′41″W	Granbury	Recorded Texas Historic Landmark

== See also ==
- National Register of Historic Places listings in Texas
- Recorded Texas Historic Landmarks in Hood County
