= Foy Steadman Site =

- Steadman, Foy, Site
- U.S. National Register of Historic Places
- Nearest city: Noodle, Texas
- Area: 50 acres (20 ha)
- NRHP reference No.: 71000932
- Added to NRHP: March 11, 1971

The Foy Steadman Site is an archeological site in Fisher County, Texas in the vicinity of Noodle, Texas. It was listed on the National Register of Historic Places in 1971.

It is the site of a Folsom culture village and is listed for its potential to yield information.

The site was found by Foy Steadman, a postman, in the 1960s, and was brought to the attention of archeologists. Over 45,000 stone tools and other artifacts have been recovered at the site.
