= National Register of Historic Places listings in Knox County, Texas =

Location of Knox County in Texas

This is a list of the National Register of Historic Places listings in Knox County, Texas.

This is intended to be a complete list of properties listed on the National Register of Historic Places in Knox County, Texas. There is one property listed on the National Register in the county. This property is also a Recorded Texas Historic Landmark.

This National Park Service list is complete through NPS recent listings posted March 21, 2025.

== Current listings ==
The locations of National Register properties may be seen in a mapping service provided.

| | Name on the Register | Image | Date listed | Location | City or town | Description |
|---|---|---|---|---|---|---|
| 1 | State Highway 16 Bridge at the Brazos River | State Highway 16 Bridge at the Brazos River | October 10, 1996 (#96001123) | TX 6, 6 mi (9.7 km). S of jct. with US 82; 33°30′02″N 99°48′07″W | Benjamin | Recorded Texas Historic Landmark |

== See also ==
- National Register of Historic Places listings in Texas
- Recorded Texas Historic Landmarks in Knox County
