= National Register of Historic Places listings in Eastland County, Texas =

Location of Eastland County in Texas

This is a list of the National Register of Historic Places listings in Eastland County, Texas.

This is intended to be a complete list of properties and districts listed on the National Register of Historic Places in Eastland County, Texas. One district and one individual property are listed on the national register in the county. The individually listed property is a Recorded Texas Historic Landmark (RTHL) and is part of the district, which includes additional RTHLs.

This National Park Service list is complete through NPS recent listings posted March 21, 2025.

== Current listings ==
The locations of national register properties and districts may be seen in a mapping service provided.

	Name on the Register	Image	Date listed	Location	City or town	Description
1	Cisco Historic District	Cisco Historic District	November 20, 1984 (#84000334)	Roughly bounded by Conrad Hilton Ave., W. 3rd St., Ave. K, W. 8th and 9th Sts. 32°23′19″N 98°59′01″W	Cisco	Includes Recorded Texas Historic Landmarks
2	Mobley Hotel	Mobley Hotel	May 13, 1981 (#81000628)	4th St. and Conrad Hilton Ave. 32°23′30″N 98°58′51″W	Cisco	Part of Cisco Historic District; Recorded Texas Historic Landmark

== See also ==
- National Register of Historic Places listings in Texas
- Recorded Texas Historic Landmarks in Eastland County
