= Noodle, Texas =

- Unincorporated community
- Location within Texas Location within the United States
- Coordinates: 32°36′08″N 100°03′07″W
- Country: United States
- State: Texas
- County: Jones
- Elevation: 1,824 ft (556 m)
- Time zone: UTC-6 (Central (CST))
  - Summer (DST): UTC-5 (CDT)
- GNIS feature ID: 1342656

Noodle is an unincorporated community in Jones County, Texas, United States.

== History ==
A post office called Noodle was established in 1900, and remained in operation until it was discontinued in 1924. Noodle has been noted for its unusual place name. The name comes from nearby Noodle Creek, a dry creek named for the local term for "nothing" according to local history.
