= Doan's Adobe House =

- U.S. National Register of Historic Places
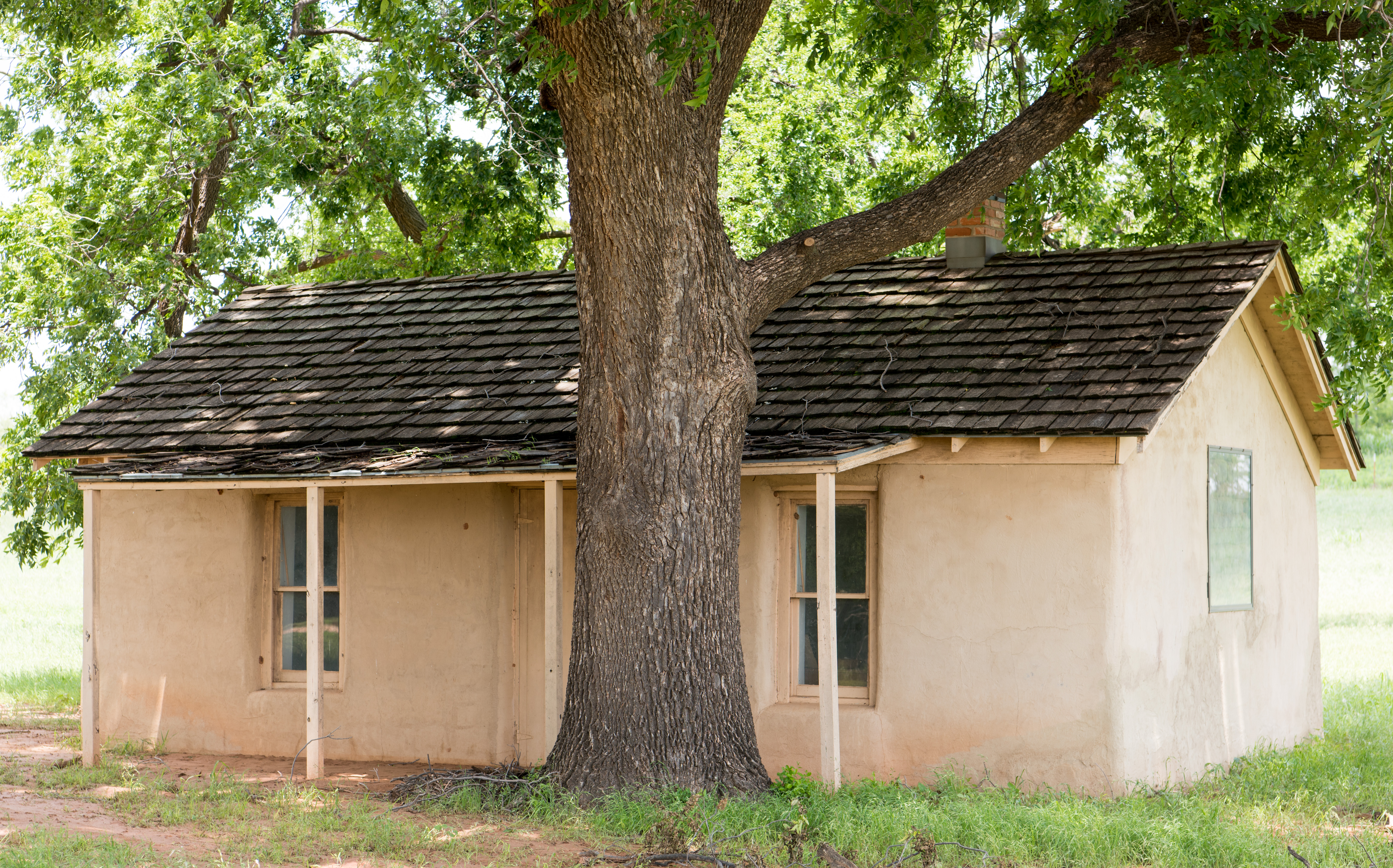

- Location within Texas
- Nearest city: Odell, Texas
- Coordinates: 34.343499°N 99.255840°W
- Area: 2.5 acres (1.0 ha)
- Built: c.1880
- Built by: Corwin F. Doan
- NRHP reference No.: 79003023
- Added to NRHP: February 8, 1979

Doan's Adobe House, in Wilbarger County, Texas near Odell, Texas, was built around 1880. It was listed on the National Register of Historic Places in 1979.

It is an adobe house built by Corwin F. Doan, originally built 17 by 27.5 feet (5.2 m × 8.4 m) in plan, and is one of few adobe buildings in North Texas. It is the sole surviving building of the frontier town of Doan's Crossing, on the Great Western Cattle Trail from central Texas to Dodge City, Kansas, which had population of several hundred in 1885. It is at a crossing of the Red River.

It is located on County Road 111N, and/or Farm to Market Road 924, East of Odell, off U.S. 283.

It is a Recorded Texas Historic Landmark.
