= National Register of Historic Places listings in the High Plains region of Texas =

This is a list of the National Register of Historic Places listings in Texas' High Plains.

The High Plains region is an area of 41 counties defined by the Texas Comptroller for economic reporting in 2022, as mapped here. It includes all of the Texas Panhandle by most definitions of that term. The region included 2020 population of 866,000, or three percent of Texas' population, with Lubbock and Amarillo MSAs together having 68 percent of the High Plains' population.

To see all locations together in a map, click on "Map all coordinates using OpenSourceMap" at right.

== Armstrong County ==
	Name on the Register	Image	Date listed	Location	City or town	Description
1	Charles and Mary Ann (Molly) Goodnight Ranch House	Charles and Mary Ann (Molly) Goodnight Ranch House	September 20, 2007 (#07000988)	US 287 and 5000 Block County Road 25; 35°01′50″N 101°10′59″W	Goodnight	Now houses the Charles Goodnight Historical Center
2	J A Ranch	J A Ranch	October 15, 1966 (#66000807)	Palo Duro Canyon; 34°49′00″N 101°11′17″W	Palo Duro	aka Goodnight Ranch
3	Palo Duro Pen		July 12, 1984 (#84001568)	Address restricted	Claude	Smithsonian trinomial 41AM5
4	Palo Duro Shelter	Palo Duro Shelter	July 12, 1984 (#84001569)	Address restricted	Claude	Smithsonian trinomial 41AM6

== Bailey County ==
	Name on the Register	Image	Date listed	Location	City or town	Description
1	Bailey County Courthouse	Bailey County Courthouse	June 24, 2026 (#100013170)	300 S. 1st Street; 34°13′27″N 102°43′33″W	Muleshoe	

== Briscoe County ==
	Name on the Register	Image	Date listed	Location	City or town	Description
1	Lake Theo Folsom Site Complex	Lake Theo Folsom Site Complex	April 28, 1975 (#75001960)	Caprock Canyons State Park; 34°24′48″N 101°04′00″W	Quitaque	Primarily located on the southern side of Lake Theo
2	Mayfield Dugout		June 18, 1973 (#73001960)	7 mi. NW of Silverton; 34°30′29″N 101°25′26″W	Silverton	

== Carson County ==
	Name on the Register	Image	Date listed	Location	City or town	Description
1	Atchison, Topeka and Santa Fe Railway Depot, Panhandle	Atchison, Topeka and Santa Fe Railway Depot, Panhandle	April 25, 2003 (#03000326)	One Main St. 35°20′28″N 101°22′39″W	Panhandle	Recorded Texas Historic Landmark, now the Panhandle City Hall
2	Carson County Square House Museum	Carson County Square House Museum	March 7, 1973 (#73001961)	5th and Elsie Sts. 35°20′46″N 101°22′49″W	Panhandle	Recorded Texas Historic Landmark
3	Panhandle Inn		February 28, 2017 (#100000693)	301 Main St. 35°20′37″N 101°22′48″W	Panhandle	
4	Route 66, Texas 207 to I-40	Route 66, Texas 207 to I-40	April 3, 2007 (#06000924)	Texas Farm Rd. 2161, from I-40 to TX 207; 35°13′21″N 101°30′02″W	Conway	

== Castro County ==
	Name on the Register	Image	Date listed	Location	City or town	Description
1	Castro County Courthouse	Castro County Courthouse	March 19, 2026 (#100012830)	100 E. Bedford Street; 34°33′03″N 102°18′42″W	Dimmitt	

== Childress County ==
	Name on the Register	Image	Date listed	Location	City or town	Description
1	Childress Commercial and Civic Historic District	Childress Commercial and Civic Historic District	June 7, 2016 (#16000349)	Roughly bounded by 3rd St., NW., Aves. A & I, 2nd St., NE., Fair Park & 810 Ave. I NE. 34°25′24″N 100°12′24″W	Childress	Includes Recorded Texas Historic Landmarks

== Cochran County ==
(has no NRHP listings)

== Collingsworth County ==
	Name on the Register	Image	Date listed	Location	City or town	Description
1	State Highway 203 (Old TX 52) Bridge at Salt Fork of the Red River		April 14, 2015 (#15000152)	TX 203 at Salt Fork of Red River; 34°53′15″N 100°03′04″W	Wellington vicinity	
2	US 83 Bridge at the Salt Fork of the Red River		October 10, 1996 (#96001117)	US 83, 16 mi. S of Wheeler Cnty. line 34°57′27″N 100°13′16″W	Wellington	Demolished

== Crosby County ==
(has no NRHP listings)

== Dallam County ==
	Name on the Register	Image	Date listed	Location	City or town	Description
1	Dallam County Courthouse	Dallam County Courthouse	October 15, 1992 (#92001375)	Jct. of Fifth and Denrock Sts. 36°03′42″N 102°31′21″W	Dalhart	Recorded Texas Historic Landmark

== Deaf Smith County ==
	Name on the Register	Image	Date listed	Location	City or town	Description
1	E. B. Black House	E. B. Black House	July 17, 1978 (#78002923)	508 W. 3rd St. 34°48′52″N 102°24′17″W	Hereford	State Antiquities Landmark, Recorded Texas Historic Landmark; houses Deaf Smith County Historical Museum
2	Glenrio Historic District	Glenrio Historic District	January 17, 2007 (#06001258)	Loop 504; 35°10′44″N 103°02′32″W	Glenrio	Extends into Quay County, New Mexico

== Dickens County ==
	Name on the Register	Image	Date listed	Location	City or town	Description
1	Dickens County Courthouse and Jail	Dickens County Courthouse and Jail	September 4, 1980 (#80004098)	Bounded by 4th, 5th, Montgomery and Crow Sts. 33°37′16″N 100°50′10″W	Dickens	State Antiquities Landmark, Recorded Texas Historic Landmark

== Donley County ==
	Name on the Register	Image	Date listed	Location	City or town	Description
1	Clarendon Motor Company Building	Clarendon Motor Company Building	November 10, 1994 (#94001309)	221 S. Sully St. 34°56′16″N 100°53′20″W	Clarendon	
2	Donley County Courthouse and Jail	Donley County Courthouse and Jail	February 17, 1978 (#78002924)	Public Sq. 34°56′14″N 100°53′26″W	Clarendon	State Antiquities Landmark, Recorded Texas Historic Landmark
3	Martin-Lowe House	Martin-Lowe House	November 21, 1985 (#85002911)	507 W. Fifth; 34°56′13″N 100°53′38″W	Clarendon	Recorded Texas Historic Landmark

== Floyd County ==
	Name on the Register	Image	Date listed	Location	City or town	Description
1	Floyd County Stone Corral	Floyd County Stone Corral	September 27, 1984 (#84001666)	Address restricted	Floydada	
2	Floydada Country Club Site	Floydada Country Club Site	November 7, 1979 (#79002939)	Address restricted	Floydada	
3	Quitaque Railway Tunnel		September 13, 1977 (#77001442)	10 mi (16 km). SW of Quitaque; 34°14′34″N 101°07′17″W	Quitaque	Now known as the Clarity Tunnel; State Antiquities Landmark

== Garza County ==
	Name on the Register	Image	Date listed	Location	City or town	Description
1	Cooper's Canyon Site 41 GR 25	Cooper's Canyon Site 41 GR 25	November 7, 1978 (#78002933)	Address restricted	Post	
2	Garza County Courthouse	Garza County Courthouse	November 21, 2001 (#01001266)	300 W. Main St. 33°11′27″N 101°22′53″W	Post	Recorded Texas Historic Landmark
3	O.S. Ranch Petroglyphs 41 GR 57	O.S. Ranch Petroglyphs 41 GR 57	January 31, 1978 (#78002934)	Address restricted	Post	
4	Old Post Sanitarium	Old Post Sanitarium	May 21, 1975 (#75001984)	117 North Ave. N 33°11′31″N 101°23′01″W	Post	Recorded Texas Historic Landmark
5	Post West Dugout	Post West Dugout	May 22, 1978 (#78002935)	Address restricted	Post	
6	Post-Montgomery Site 41 GR 188	Post-Montgomery Site 41 GR 188	November 7, 1978 (#78002936)	Address restricted	Post	

== Gray County ==
	Name on the Register	Image	Date listed	Location	City or town	Description
1	Central Fire Station	Central Fire Station	December 30, 1999 (#99001623)	203 W. Foster; 35°32′06″N 100°57′44″W	Pampa	
2	Combs-Worley Building	Combs-Worley Building	December 30, 1999 (#99001625)	120 W. Kingsmille; 35°32′12″N 100°57′46″W	Pampa	Recorded Texas Historic Landmark
3	Gray County Courthouse	Gray County Courthouse	February 20, 1998 (#98000142)	205 N. Russell; 35°32′12″N 100°57′50″W	Pampa	Recorded Texas Historic Landmark
4	McLean Commercial Historic District	McLean Commercial Historic District	December 20, 2006 (#06001153)	Roughly bounded by Railroad, Rowe, Second and Gray Sts. 35°13′58″N 100°36′09″W	McLean	
5	Pampa City Hall	Pampa City Hall	December 30, 1999 (#99001622)	200 W. Foster; 35°32′08″N 100°57′46″W	Pampa	Recorded Texas Historic Landmark
6	Schneider Hotel	Schneider Hotel	December 19, 1985 (#85003215)	120 S. Russell; 35°32′04″N 100°57′42″W	Pampa	
7	US Post Office-Pampa Main	US Post Office-Pampa Main	November 17, 1986 (#86003236)	120 E. Foster; 35°32′10″N 100°57′36″W	Pampa	Recorded Texas Historic Landmark
8	White Deer Land Company Building	White Deer Land Company Building	January 14, 2000 (#99001701)	116 S. Cuyler; 35°32′05″N 100°57′38″W	Pampa	

== Hale County ==
	Name on the Register	Image	Date listed	Location	City or town	Description
1	Plainview Commercial Historic District	Plainview Commercial Historic District	December 2, 1982 (#82004855)	Roughly bounded by E. 4th, Austin, E. 9th, and Ash Sts. (both sides); 34°11′08″N 101°42′11″W	Plainview	Includes one Recorded Texas Historic Landmark
2	Plainview Site	Plainview Site	October 15, 1966 (#66000814)	Address restricted	Plainview	

== Hall County ==
	Name on the Register	Image	Date listed	Location	City or town	Description
1	Hall County Courthouse	Hall County Courthouse	October 1, 2008 (#08000961)	512 W. Main; 34°43′31″N 100°32′06″W	Memphis	State Antiquities Landmark, Recorded Texas Historic Landmark
2	Hotel Turkey	Hotel Turkey	October 24, 1991 (#91001521)	Jct. of 3rd and Alexander Sts. 34°23′38″N 100°53′51″W	Turkey	Recorded Texas Historic Landmark

== Hansford County ==
	Name on the Register	Image	Date listed	Location	City or town	Description
1	Hansford County Courthouse	Hansford County Courthouse	March 22, 2019 (#100003537)	15 NW Court St. 36°11′54″N 101°11′32″W	Spearman	

== Hartley County ==
	Name on the Register	Image	Date listed	Location	City or town	Description
1	Hartley County Courthouse and Jail	Hartley County Courthouse and Jail	December 31, 1987 (#87002237)	Railroad Ave. 35°40′54″N 102°19′57″W	Channing	State Antiquities Landmark, Recorded Texas Historic Landmarks
2	Proctor Pen I	Proctor Pen I	July 12, 1984 (#84001852)	Address restricted	Amarillo	
3	Miguel Tafoya Place	Miguel Tafoya Place	July 12, 1984 (#84001854)	Address restricted	Amarillo	
4	XIT General Office	XIT General Office	May 6, 1985 (#85000960)	Railroad Ave. and 5th St. 35°41′09″N 102°19′52″W	Channing	Recorded Texas Historic Landmarks

== Hemphill County ==
	Name on the Register	Image	Date listed	Location	City or town	Description
1	Battle of Lyman's Wagon Train	Battle of Lyman's Wagon Train	August 13, 2001 (#01000875)	Address restricted	Canadian	

== Hockley County ==
(has no NRHP listings)

== Hutchinson County ==
	Name on the Register	Image	Date listed	Location	City or town	Description
1	Adobe Walls		May 22, 1978 (#78002958)	Address restricted	Stinnett	
2	Antelope Creek Archeological District	Antelope Creek Archeological District	September 22, 1972 (#72001366)	Address restricted	Fritch	
3	Hutchinson County Courthouse	Hutchinson County Courthouse	August 28, 2012 (#12000587)	500 North Main Street; 35°49′39″N 101°26′32″W	Stinnett	Recorded Texas Historic Landmark

== King County ==
(has no NRHP listings)

== Lamb County ==
(has no NRHP listings)

== Lipscomb County ==
	Name on the Register	Image	Date listed	Location	City or town	Description
1	Lipscomb County Courthouse	Lipscomb County Courthouse	July 9, 2008 (#08000730)	Courthouse Square; 36°14′02″N 100°16′14″W	Lipscomb	State Antiquities Landmark, Recorded Texas Historic Landmark

== Lubbock County ==
	Name on the Register	Image	Date listed	Location	City or town	Description
1	Warren and Myrta Bacon House	Warren and Myrta Bacon House	July 15, 1982 (#82004512)	1802 Broadway; 33°35′06″N 101°51′23″W	Lubbock	Recorded Texas Historic Landmark
2	Cactus Theater	Cactus Theater	May 8, 1998 (#98000447)	1812 Buddy Holly Ave. 33°34′42″N 101°50′39″W	Lubbock	
3	Canyon Lakes Archeological District	Canyon Lakes Archeological District	March 26, 1976 (#76002049)	Address restricted	Lubbock	
4	Carlock Building	Carlock Building	July 28, 2004 (#04000767)	1001-1013 13th St. 33°35′00″N 101°50′45″W	Lubbock	
5	Fort Worth and Denver South Plains Railway Depot	Fort Worth and Denver South Plains Railway Depot	July 26, 1990 (#90001120)	1801 Ave. G 33°34′43″N 101°50′32″W	Lubbock	
6	Great Plains Life Insurance Company Building	Great Plains Life Insurance Company Building	March 17, 2021 (#100006318)	1220 Broadway; 33°35′05″N 101°50′56″W	Lubbock	AKA Metro Tower or NTS Tower.
7	Holden Properties Historic District	Holden Properties Historic District	May 29, 1998 (#98000602)	3103, 3105, 3105A, 3105B, 3107, 3109, and 3111 20th St. 33°34′34″N 101°52′56″W	Lubbock	
8	William Curry and Olive Price Holden House	William Curry and Olive Price Holden House	August 5, 1994 (#94000834)	3109 20th St. 33°34′34″N 101°52′54″W	Lubbock	Part of Holden Properties Historic District
9	In Town Inn		September 1, 2022 (#100008171)	1212 Main St. 33°35′08″N 101°50′54″W	Lubbock	
10	Kress Building	Kress Building	October 2, 1992 (#92001305)	1109 Broadway; 33°35′05″N 101°50′50″W	Lubbock	
11	Lubbock County Jail	Lubbock County Jail	February 13, 2018 (#100002130)	811 Main St. 33°35′08″N 101°50′38″W	Lubbock	
12	Lubbock High School	Lubbock High School	May 1, 1985 (#85000924)	2004 19th St. 33°34′41″N 101°51′35″W	Lubbock	Recorded Texas Historic Landmark
13	Lubbock Lake Site	Lubbock Lake Site	June 21, 1971 (#71000948)	Landmark Dr off US 84; 33°37′19″N 101°53′23″W	Lubbock	
14	Lubbock Post Office and Federal Building	Lubbock Post Office and Federal Building	February 17, 1995 (#95000101)	800 Broadway; 33°35′06″N 101°50′35″W	Lubbock	
15	Pittsburgh Plate Glass Company		March 13, 2026 (#100012805)	611 23rd Street; 33°34′27″N 101°50′30″W	Lubbock	
16	Fred and Annie Snyder House	Fred and Annie Snyder House	January 28, 1992 (#91002019)	2701 19th St. 33°34′38″N 101°52′30″W	Lubbock	
17	South Overton Residential Historic District	South Overton Residential Historic District	March 14, 1996 (#96000276)	Roughly bounded by Broadway, Ave. Q., 19th St. and University Ave. 33°34′51″N 101°51′47″W	Lubbock	
18	Texas Technological College Dairy Barn	Texas Technological College Dairy Barn	April 2, 1992 (#92000336)	Texas Tech University campus 33°34′53″N 101°52′40″W	Lubbock	Recorded Texas Historic Landmark; part of Texas Technological College Historic District
19	Texas Technological College Historic District	Texas Technological College Historic District	May 10, 1996 (#96000523)	Roughly bounded by 6th St., University Ave., 19th St., and Flint St. 33°35′02″N 101°52′28″W	Lubbock	
20	Tubbs-Carlisle House	Tubbs-Carlisle House	November 2, 1990 (#90001719)	602 Fulton Ave. 33°35′23″N 101°56′35″W	Lubbock	Recorded Texas Historic Landmark

== Lynn County ==
	Name on the Register	Image	Date listed	Location	City or town	Description
1	Lynn County Courthouse	Lynn County Courthouse	July 8, 1982 (#82004513)	Bounded by 1st St., 2nd St., Ave. H, and Ave. J 33°09′53″N 101°47′46″W	Tahoka	Courthouse built in 1916, still in use as that in 2023; also a State Antiquities Landmark, Recorded Texas Historic Landmark

== Moore County ==
(has no NRHP listings)

== Motley County ==
	Name on the Register	Image	Date listed	Location	City or town	Description
1	Traweek House	Traweek House	May 2, 1991 (#91000486)	927 Lariat St. 34°00′41″N 100°49′29″W	Matador	Recorded Texas Historic Landmark

== Ochiltree County ==
	Name on the Register	Image	Date listed	Location	City or town	Description
1	Buried City Site (41OC1)	Buried City Site (41OC1)	September 13, 1984 (#84001923)	Address restricted	Perryton	
2	Plainview Hardware Company Building		June 14, 1990 (#90000904)	210 S. Main St. 36°23′53″N 100°48′10″W	Perryton	

== Oldham County ==
	Name on the Register	Image	Date listed	Location	City or town	Description
1	Chavez City Ruins (41OL253)	Chavez City Ruins (41OL253)	July 12, 1984 (#84001925)	Address restricted	Amarillo	
2	Chavez Suburbs East and West (41OL254)	Chavez Suburbs East and West (41OL254)	July 12, 1984 (#84001928)	Address restricted	Amarillo	
3	Green No. 5 (41OL257)	Green No. 5 (41OL257)	July 12, 1984 (#84001936)	Address restricted	Amarillo	
4	Griffin Site (41OL246)	Griffin Site (41OL246)	July 12, 1984 (#84001938)	Address restricted	Amarillo	
5	Landergin Mesa	Landergin Mesa	October 15, 1966 (#66000821)	Address restricted	Vega	
6	Mansfield I (41OL50)	Mansfield I (41OL50)	July 12, 1984 (#84001940)	Address restricted	Amarillo	
7	Maston I (41OL256)	Maston I (41OL256)	July 12, 1984 (#84001942)	Address restricted	Amarillo	
8	Maston No. 13 Stone Wall (41OL249)	Maston No. 13 Stone Wall (41OL249)	September 10, 1984 (#84001945)	Address restricted	Adrian	
9	Maston No. 52 (41OL235)	Maston No. 52 (41OL235)	July 12, 1984 (#84001948)	Address restricted	Amarillo	
10	Rocky Dell	Rocky Dell	February 23, 1972 (#72001370)	Address restricted	Adrian	
11	Stone Corrals No. 1-6 (41OL250)	Stone Corrals No. 1-6 (41OL250)	July 12, 1984 (#84001951)	Address restricted	Amarillo	
12	Vega Motel	Vega Motel	October 5, 2006 (#06000926)	1005 Vega Blvd. 35°14′33″N 102°25′46″W	Vega	

== Parmer County ==
	Name on the Register	Image	Date listed	Location	City or town	Description
1	Parmer County Courthouse	Parmer County Courthouse	March 6, 2019 (#100003490)	401 3rd St. 34°23′05″N 103°02′22″W	Farwell	

== Potter County ==
	Name on the Register	Image	Date listed	Location	City or town	Description
1	Alibates Flint Quarries National Monument	Alibates Flint Quarries National Monument	October 15, 1966 (#66000822)	SW of Fritch on the Canadian River; 35°34′56″N 101°40′19″W	Fritch	
2	Amarillo Building	Amarillo Building	February 23, 2018 (#100002131)	301 S Polk; 35°12′38″N 101°50′11″W	Amarillo	
3	Amarillo College Administration Building and Gymnasium	Amarillo College Administration Building and Gymnasium	January 28, 1992 (#91002023)	2201 S. Washington St. and 2221 S. Washington St. 35°11′18″N 101°50′53″W	Amarillo	Recorded Texas Historic Landmarks
4	Amarillo US Post Office and Courthouse	Amarillo US Post Office and Courthouse	September 29, 2000 (#00001175)	205 E. Fifth St. 35°12′31″N 101°50′03″W	Amarillo	
5	American National Bank of Amarillo and SPS Tower	American National Bank of Amarillo and SPS Tower	March 6, 2019 (#100003493)	600 S. Tyler St. 35°12′26″N 101°50′19″W	Amarillo	
6	Atchison, Topeka and Santa Fe Railway Company Depot and Locomotive No. 5000	Atchison, Topeka and Santa Fe Railway Company Depot and Locomotive No. 5000	September 18, 1986 (#86002189)	Corner of 2nd and Lincoln; 35°12′31″N 101°49′36″W	Amarillo	Moved from original location at 307 S Grant in 2005
7	Bivins House	Bivins House	December 31, 1974 (#74002088)	1000 Polk St. 35°12′11″N 101°50′17″W	Amarillo	Recorded Texas Historic Landmark
8	Miles and Myda Bivins House	Miles and Myda Bivins House	October 2, 1992 (#92001306)	2311 W. 16th Ave. 35°11′49″N 101°51′47″W	Amarillo	
9	Central Presbyterian Church	Central Presbyterian Church	November 13, 1991 (#91001649)	1100 S Harrison St; 35°12′10″N 101°50′26″W	Amarillo	
10	Alice Ghormley Curtis House	Alice Ghormley Curtis House	August 14, 1992 (#92000980)	1626 S. Washington St. 35°11′48″N 101°50′54″W	Amarillo	Recorded Texas Historic Landmark
11	Douglas DC-3 Airplane, N34	Douglas DC-3 Airplane, N34	May 29, 1997 (#97000443)	Texas Air & Space Museum, 10001 American Drive; 35°12′48″N 101°42′53″W	Amarillo	relocated from Oklahoma City in 2014
12	First Baptist Church	First Baptist Church	June 21, 1983 (#83003158)	218 W. 13th St. 35°12′04″N 101°50′22″W	Amarillo	
13	Fisk Medical Arts Building	Fisk Medical Arts Building	December 4, 2012 (#12001003)	724 S. Polk St. 35°12′21″N 101°50′16″W	Amarillo	Recorded Texas Historic Landmark, now a Courtyard by Marriott hotel
14	Green Acres Apartments		March 21, 2024 (#100010122)	3118 SW 15th Ave. 35°11′59″N 101°52′17″W	Amarillo	
15	Herring Hotel	Herring Hotel	January 25, 2024 (#100009886)	311 SE 3rd Avenue; 35°12′37″N 101°49′59″W	Amarillo	
16	Jons-Gilvin House	Jons-Gilvin House	August 14, 1992 (#92000983)	1500 S. Buchanan St. 35°11′51″N 101°50′01″W	Amarillo	
17	Kouns-Jackson House	Kouns-Jackson House	August 14, 1992 (#92000981)	1118 S. Harrison St. 35°12′07″N 101°50′26″W	Amarillo	
18	Landergin-Harrington House	Landergin-Harrington House	December 16, 1977 (#77001466)	1600 Polk St. 35°11′49″N 101°50′20″W	Amarillo	
19	Levine's Department Store	Levine's Department Store	December 27, 2016 (#16000917)	800 S. Polk St. 35°12′19″N 101°50′16″W	Amarillo	
20	McBride Canyon Ruin	McBride Canyon Ruin	July 5, 1985 (#85001483)	Address restricted	Fritch	
21	McBride Ranch House	McBride Ranch House	April 23, 1975 (#75000152)	North of Amarillo in Lake Meredith National Recreation Area; 35°32′29″N 101°43′44″W	Amarillo	Recorded Texas Historic Landmark
22	McMillen Apartments	McMillen Apartments	April 2, 2010 (#10000145)	1320 S. Fillmore; 35°11′58″N 101°50′11″W	Amarillo	
23	Northwest Texas Hospital School of Nursing	Northwest Texas Hospital School of Nursing	November 7, 1996 (#96001234)	2209 W. 6th Ave. 35°12′32″N 101°55′39″W	Amarillo	Recorded Texas Historic Landmark
24	Oliver-Eakle-Barfield Building	Oliver-Eakle-Barfield Building	January 11, 2019 (#100003302)	600 S. Polk St. 35°12′27″N 101°50′19″W	Amarillo	
25	Plemons-Mrs. M. D. Oliver-Eakle Additions Historic District	Plemons-Mrs. M. D. Oliver-Eakle Additions Historic District	April 21, 1992 (#92000370)	Roughly bounded by 16th Ave., Taylor St., 26th Ave., Van Buren St., I-40 and Madison St. 35°11′29″N 101°50′33″W	Amarillo	
26	Polk Street Methodist Church	Polk Street Methodist Church	January 28, 1992 (#91002021)	1401 S. Polk St. 35°11′56″N 101°50′17″W	Amarillo	Recorded Texas Historic Landmark
27	Potter County Courthouse and Library	Potter County Courthouse and Library	August 22, 1996 (#96000938)	501 S. Taylor St. 35°12′29″N 101°50′06″W	Amarillo	Recorded Texas Historic Landmarks
28	Ranchotel	Ranchotel	April 14, 1995 (#95000411)	2501 W. Sixth Ave. 35°12′40″N 101°51′54″W	Amarillo	
29	St. Anthony's Hospital		January 14, 2021 (#100006047)	200 NW 7th Ave. 35°13′13″N 101°50′09″W	Amarillo	
30	Henry B. and Ellen M. Sanborn House	Henry B. and Ellen M. Sanborn House	August 14, 1992 (#92000982)	1311 S. Madison St. 35°11′59″N 101°50′25″W	Amarillo	Recorded Texas Historic Landmark
31	Santa Fe Building	Santa Fe Building	August 22, 1996 (#96000939)	900 S. Polk St. 35°12′16″N 101°50′15″W	Amarillo	Recorded Texas Historic Landmark
32	Shelton-Houghton House	Shelton-Houghton House	August 29, 1980 (#80004145)	1700 S Polk St; 35°11′42″N 101°50′22″W	Amarillo	Recorded Texas Historic Landmark
33	Louis H. Smith Inc. Firestone Store	Louis H. Smith Inc. Firestone Store	July 21, 2015 (#15000451)	1004 South Tyler Street; 35°12′12″N 101°50′22″W	Amarillo	
34	Triangle Motel	Triangle Motel	December 7, 2010 (#10000982)	7804, 7808, 7954, and 8024 E. Amarillo Blvd. 35°13′20″N 101°44′52″W	Amarillo	Route 66 in Texas MPS
35	US Route 66-Sixth Street Historic District	US Route 66-Sixth Street Historic District	August 23, 1994 (#94000982)	Sixth Ave. between Georgia and Forrest Aves. 35°12′40″N 101°52′24″W	Amarillo	
36	Vineyard Manor	Vineyard Manor	November 26, 2014 (#14000965)	1201 S. Polk Street; 35°12′04″N 101°50′17″W	Amarillo	
37	Wolflin Historic District		May 21, 1992 (#92000581)	Roughly bounded by Wolflin Ave., Washington St., SW. 34th Ave., Parker St., SW. 30th Ave. and Lipscomb St. 35°11′07″N 101°51′07″W	Amarillo	

== Randall County ==
	Name on the Register	Image	Date listed	Location	City or town	Description
1	Amarillo Globe Dream House	Amarillo Globe Dream House	December 8, 1997 (#97001532)	3104 S. Harrison; 35°10′49″N 101°50′36″W	Amarillo	Recorded Texas Historic Landmark
2	L. T. Lester House	L. T. Lester House	September 13, 1978 (#78002975)	310 8th St. 34°58′49″N 101°56′13″W	Canyon	Recorded Texas Historic Landmark
3	Llano Cemetery Historic District	Llano Cemetery Historic District	May 21, 1992 (#92000584)	2900 South Hayes; 35°10′50″N 101°49′45″W	Amarillo	
4	St. Mary's Catholic Church	St. Mary's Catholic Church	June 21, 1983 (#83003159)	22830 Pondesetta Rd; 34°57′24″N 102°06′29″W	Umbarger	

== Roberts County ==
	Name on the Register	Image	Date listed	Location	City or town	Description
1	Roberts County Courthouse	Roberts County Courthouse	March 22, 2004 (#04000228)	301 E. Commercial St. 35°41′34″N 100°38′07″W	Miami	State Antiquities Landmark, Recorded Texas Historic Landmark

== Sherman County ==
(has no NRHP listings)

== Swisher County ==
(has no NRHP listings)

== Terry County ==
(has no NRHP listings)

== Wheeler County ==
	Name on the Register	Image	Date listed	Location	City or town	Description
1	Battle of Sweetwater Creek		August 13, 2001 (#01000876)	Address restricted	Mobeetie	
2	Route 66 Bridge over the Chicago, Rock Island and Gulf Railroad	Route 66 Bridge over the Chicago, Rock Island and Gulf Railroad	April 3, 2007 (#06000925)	I-40 south frontage road over the former CRI&G RR ROW; 35°13′35″N 100°06′20″W	Shamrock	
3	Route 66 in Wheeler County, Texas	Route 66 in Wheeler County, Texas	September 22, 2020 (#100005601)	South side frontage road of I 40 between Gray Co. (TX) and Beckham Co. (OK) lines. 35°13′35″N 100°17′24″W	Shamrock vicinity	
4	Tower Station	Tower Station	September 18, 1997 (#97001160)	101 E. 12th St. 35°13′36″N 100°14′55″W	Shamrock	Recorded Texas Historic Landmark, also called Tower Station

== Yoakum County ==
(has no NRHP listings)
