= National Register of Historic Places listings in Potter County, Texas =

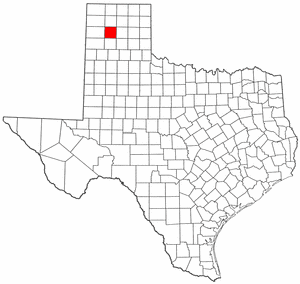
Location of Potter County in Texas

This is a list of the National Register of Historic Places listings in Potter County, Texas

This is intended to be a complete list of properties and districts listed on the National Register of Historic Places in Potter County, Texas. Five districts including one national monument and 32 individual properties are listed on the National Register in the county. Thirteen of the county's Recorded Texas Historic Landmarks are included in the National Register.

This National Park Service list is complete through NPS recent listings posted March 6, 2026.

== Current listings ==
The publicly disclosed locations of National Register properties and districts may be seen in a mapping service provided.

| | Name on the Register | Image | Date listed | Location | City or town | Description |
|---|---|---|---|---|---|---|
| 1 | Alibates Flint Quarries National Monument | Alibates Flint Quarries National Monument | October 15, 1966 (#66000822) | SW of Fritch on the Canadian River; 35°34′56″N 101°40′19″W | Fritch | |
| 2 | Amarillo Building | Amarillo Building | February 23, 2018 (#100002131) | 301 S Polk; 35°12′38″N 101°50′11″W | Amarillo | |
| 3 | Amarillo College Administration Building and Gymnasium | Amarillo College Administration Building and Gymnasium | January 28, 1992 (#91002023) | 2201 S. Washington St. and 2221 S. Washington St. 35°11′18″N 101°50′53″W | Amarillo | Recorded Texas Historic Landmarks |
| 4 | Amarillo US Post Office and Courthouse | Amarillo US Post Office and Courthouse | September 29, 2000 (#00001175) | 205 E. Fifth St. 35°12′31″N 101°50′03″W | Amarillo | |
| 5 | American National Bank of Amarillo and SPS Tower | American National Bank of Amarillo and SPS Tower | March 6, 2019 (#100003493) | 600 S. Tyler St. 35°12′26″N 101°50′19″W | Amarillo | |
| 6 | Atchison, Topeka and Santa Fe Railway Company Depot and Locomotive No. 5000 | Atchison, Topeka and Santa Fe Railway Company Depot and Locomotive No. 5000 | September 18, 1986 (#86002189) | Corner of 2nd and Lincoln; 35°12′31″N 101°49′36″W | Amarillo | Moved from original location at 307 S Grant in 2005 |
| 7 | Bivins House | Bivins House | December 31, 1974 (#74002088) | 1000 Polk St. 35°12′11″N 101°50′17″W | Amarillo | Recorded Texas Historic Landmark |
| 8 | Miles and Myda Bivins House | Miles and Myda Bivins House | October 2, 1992 (#92001306) | 2311 W. 16th Ave. 35°11′49″N 101°51′47″W | Amarillo | |
| 9 | Central Presbyterian Church | Central Presbyterian Church | November 13, 1991 (#91001649) | 1100 S Harrison St; 35°12′10″N 101°50′26″W | Amarillo | |
| 10 | Alice Ghormley Curtis House | Alice Ghormley Curtis House | August 14, 1992 (#92000980) | 1626 S. Washington St. 35°11′48″N 101°50′54″W | Amarillo | Recorded Texas Historic Landmark |
| 11 | Douglas DC-3 Airplane, N34 | Douglas DC-3 Airplane, N34 | May 29, 1997 (#97000443) | Texas Air & Space Museum, 10001 American Drive; 35°12′48″N 101°42′53″W | Amarillo | relocated from Oklahoma City in 2014 |
| 12 | First Baptist Church | First Baptist Church | June 21, 1983 (#83003158) | 218 W. 13th St. 35°12′04″N 101°50′22″W | Amarillo | |
| 13 | Fisk Medical Arts Building | Fisk Medical Arts Building | December 4, 2012 (#12001003) | 724 S. Polk St. 35°12′21″N 101°50′16″W | Amarillo | Recorded Texas Historic Landmark, now a Courtyard by Marriott hotel |
| 14 | Green Acres Apartments | | March 21, 2024 (#100010122) | 3118 SW 15th Ave. 35°11′59″N 101°52′17″W | Amarillo | |
| 15 | Herring Hotel | Herring Hotel | January 25, 2024 (#100009886) | 311 SE 3rd Avenue; 35°12′37″N 101°49′59″W | Amarillo | |
| 16 | Jons-Gilvin House | Jons-Gilvin House | August 14, 1992 (#92000983) | 1500 S. Buchanan St. 35°11′51″N 101°50′01″W | Amarillo | |
| 17 | Kouns-Jackson House | Kouns-Jackson House | August 14, 1992 (#92000981) | 1118 S. Harrison St. 35°12′07″N 101°50′26″W | Amarillo | |
| 18 | Landergin-Harrington House | Landergin-Harrington House | December 16, 1977 (#77001466) | 1600 Polk St. 35°11′49″N 101°50′20″W | Amarillo | |
| 19 | Levine's Department Store | Levine's Department Store | December 27, 2016 (#16000917) | 800 S. Polk St. 35°12′19″N 101°50′16″W | Amarillo | |
| 20 | McBride Canyon Ruin | McBride Canyon Ruin | July 5, 1985 (#85001483) | Address restricted | Fritch | |
| 21 | McBride Ranch House | McBride Ranch House | April 23, 1975 (#75000152) | North of Amarillo in Lake Meredith National Recreation Area; 35°32′29″N 101°43′44″W | Amarillo | Recorded Texas Historic Landmark |
| 22 | McMillen Apartments | McMillen Apartments | April 2, 2010 (#10000145) | 1320 S. Fillmore; 35°11′58″N 101°50′11″W | Amarillo | |
| 23 | Northwest Texas Hospital School of Nursing | Northwest Texas Hospital School of Nursing | November 7, 1996 (#96001234) | 2209 W. 6th Ave. 35°12′32″N 101°55′39″W | Amarillo | Recorded Texas Historic Landmark |
| 24 | Oliver-Eakle-Barfield Building | Oliver-Eakle-Barfield Building | January 11, 2019 (#100003302) | 600 S. Polk St. 35°12′27″N 101°50′19″W | Amarillo | |
| 25 | Plemons-Mrs. M. D. Oliver-Eakle Additions Historic District | Plemons-Mrs. M. D. Oliver-Eakle Additions Historic District | April 21, 1992 (#92000370) | Roughly bounded by 16th Ave., Taylor St., 26th Ave., Van Buren St., I-40 and Madison St. 35°11′29″N 101°50′33″W | Amarillo | |
| 26 | Polk Street Methodist Church | Polk Street Methodist Church | January 28, 1992 (#91002021) | 1401 S. Polk St. 35°11′56″N 101°50′17″W | Amarillo | Recorded Texas Historic Landmark |
| 27 | Potter County Courthouse and Library | Potter County Courthouse and Library | August 22, 1996 (#96000938) | 501 S. Taylor St. 35°12′29″N 101°50′06″W | Amarillo | Recorded Texas Historic Landmarks |
| 28 | Ranchotel | Ranchotel | April 14, 1995 (#95000411) | 2501 W. Sixth Ave. 35°12′40″N 101°51′54″W | Amarillo | |
| 29 | St. Anthony's Hospital | | January 14, 2021 (#100006047) | 200 NW 7th Ave. 35°13′13″N 101°50′09″W | Amarillo | |
| 30 | Henry B. and Ellen M. Sanborn House | Henry B. and Ellen M. Sanborn House | August 14, 1992 (#92000982) | 1311 S. Madison St. 35°11′59″N 101°50′25″W | Amarillo | Recorded Texas Historic Landmark |
| 31 | Santa Fe Building | Santa Fe Building | August 22, 1996 (#96000939) | 900 S. Polk St. 35°12′16″N 101°50′15″W | Amarillo | Recorded Texas Historic Landmark |
| 32 | Shelton-Houghton House | Shelton-Houghton House | August 29, 1980 (#80004145) | 1700 S Polk St; 35°11′42″N 101°50′22″W | Amarillo | Recorded Texas Historic Landmark |
| 33 | Louis H. Smith Inc. Firestone Store | Louis H. Smith Inc. Firestone Store | July 21, 2015 (#15000451) | 1004 South Tyler Street; 35°12′12″N 101°50′22″W | Amarillo | |
| 34 | Triangle Motel | Triangle Motel | December 7, 2010 (#10000982) | 7804, 7808, 7954, and 8024 E. Amarillo Blvd. 35°13′20″N 101°44′52″W | Amarillo | Route 66 in Texas MPS |
| 35 | US Route 66-Sixth Street Historic District | US Route 66-Sixth Street Historic District | August 23, 1994 (#94000982) | Sixth Ave. between Georgia and Forrest Aves. 35°12′40″N 101°52′24″W | Amarillo | |
| 36 | Vineyard Manor | Vineyard Manor | November 26, 2014 (#14000965) | 1201 S. Polk Street; 35°12′04″N 101°50′17″W | Amarillo | |
| 37 | Wolflin Historic District | | May 21, 1992 (#92000581) | Roughly bounded by Wolflin Ave., Washington St., SW. 34th Ave., Parker St., SW. 30th Ave. and Lipscomb St. 35°11′07″N 101°51′07″W | Amarillo | |

== See also ==
- National Register of Historic Places listings in Texas
- Recorded Texas Historic Landmarks in Potter County
