= Palace Theater (Childress, Texas) =

Historic theater building in Childress, Texas

Coordinates: 34.4227°N 100.2062°W

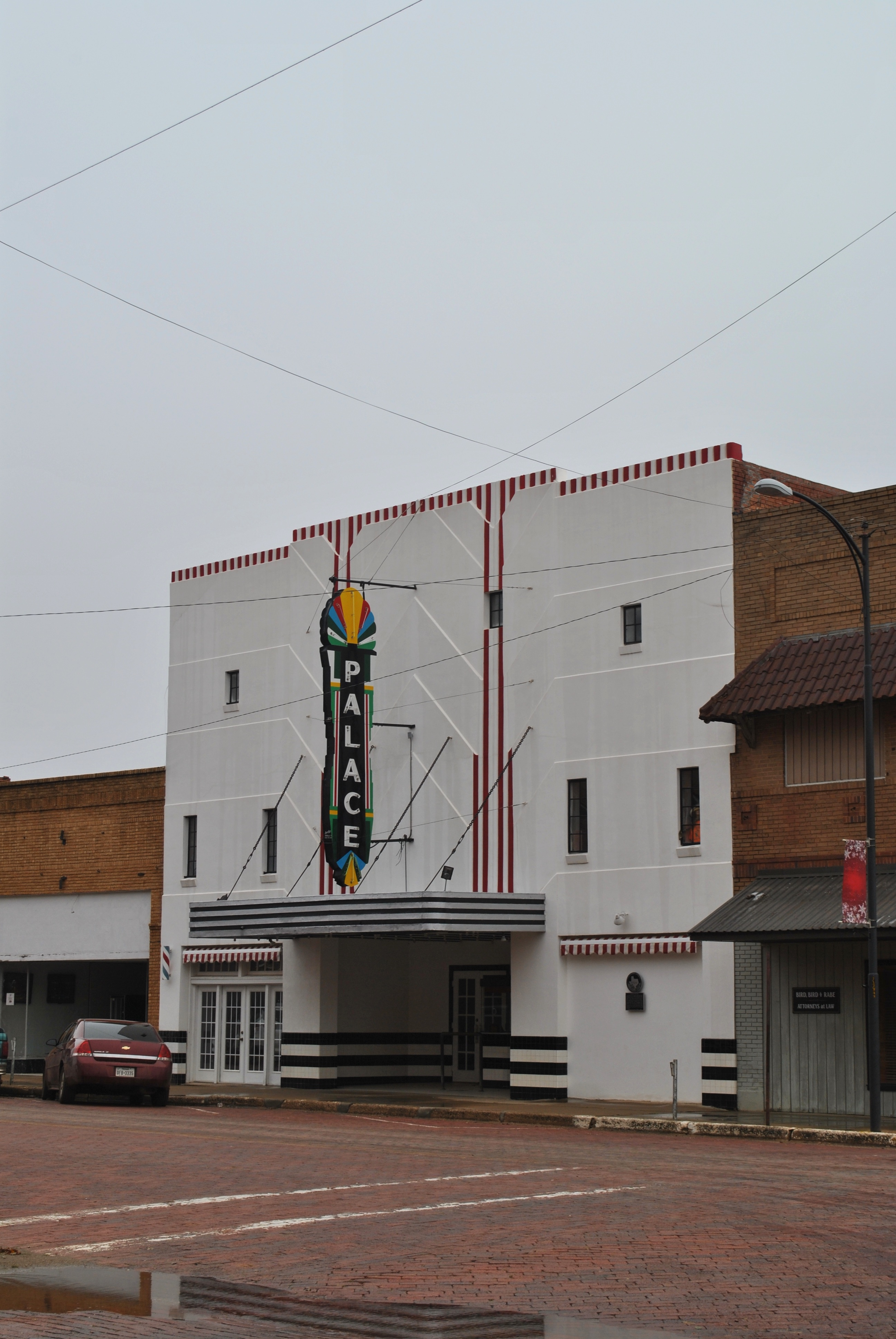
Palace Theater in 2015

Palace Theater is a historic theater building in Childress, Texas, United States. Located at 206 N. Main St., it is a Recorded Texas Historic Landmark and a contributing property in the Childress Commercial and Civic Historic District.

== History ==
F.M. Phipps and G.S. Layton opened the Palace Theater in 1926. The theater suffered two fires, the second of which burned it to the ground in 1936. After the fire, Phipps' widow, Mable Phipps, and Layton's son, G.R. Layton, hired Dallas architect W. Scott Dunne to design a new moviehouse on the site.

The rebuilt Palace Theater was constructed by H.J. Naylor and reopened in February 1937. The Palace Barber Shop and City Newsstand also operated from the building. The Palace later showed the Childress versions of Melton Barker's short film The Kidnappers Foil, which were filmed in 1937 and 1948; the 1937 Childress version was selected for the National Film Registry in 2012. The theater closed in the 1980s. Local preservation efforts later used attention from The Kidnappers Foil and events including Childress Theatre Company's 2013 RanchFest to raise money for restoration of the Palace Theater.

== Architecture and designation ==
The Texas Historical Commission describes the building as having Art Moderne architectural features, including zigzag patterning. SAH Archipedia describes the 1937 building as having a three-story, flat stucco facade scored with horizontal and diagonal lines, with vertical red and white lines ending at a cornice of red and white dentil-like shapes. The Palace Theater was designated a Recorded Texas Historic Landmark in 2005. It is also one of the significant buildings in the Childress Commercial and Civic Historic District, which was listed on the National Register of Historic Places in 2016.

== See also ==
- National Register of Historic Places listings in Childress County, Texas
- Recorded Texas Historic Landmark
