= William M. Rice =

William M. Rice may refer to:

- William Marsh Rice, founder of Rice University, in Texas
- William Marsh Rice Jr., namesake of Will Rice College
- William M. Rice, designer of Lipscomb County Courthouse and Lynn County Courthouse in Texas
