= Fair Park (disambiguation) =

Fair Park is a recreation complex in Dallas, Texas. Fair Park may also refer to:

- Fair Park (Tyler, Texas), former ballpark of Tyler sports.
- Fair Park (Childress, Texas), a city park included in Childress Commercial and Civic Historic District
- Fair Park (DART station), light rail station servicing Dallas, Texas
- Fair Park, former amusement park located at the Tennessee State Fairgrounds in Nashville (now officially Fairgrounds Nashville)
- Fair Park Medical Careers Magnet High School, high school in Shreveport, Louisiana, formerly known as Fair Park High School
