= National Register of Historic Places listings in Lynn County, Texas =

Location of Lynn County in Texas

This is a list of the National Register of Historic Places listings in Lynn County, Texas.

This is intended to be a complete list of properties listed on the National Register of Historic Places in Lynn County, Texas. There is one property listed on the National Register in the county. This property is also a State Antiquities Landmark and a Recorded Texas Historic Landmark.

This National Park Service list is complete through NPS recent listings posted March 21, 2025.

== Current listings ==
The locations of National Register properties may be seen in a mapping service provided.

| | Name on the Register | Image | Date listed | Location | City or town | Description |
|---|---|---|---|---|---|---|
| 1 | Lynn County Courthouse | Lynn County Courthouse | July 8, 1982 (#82004513) | Bounded by 1st St., 2nd St., Ave. H, and Ave. J 33°09′53″N 101°47′46″W | Tahoka | Courthouse built in 1916, still in use as that in 2023; also a State Antiquities Landmark, Recorded Texas Historic Landmark |

== See also ==
- National Register of Historic Places listings in Texas
- Recorded Texas Historic Landmarks in Lynn County
