= Lynn County Courthouse =

Historic Courthouse

- U.S. National Register of Historic Places
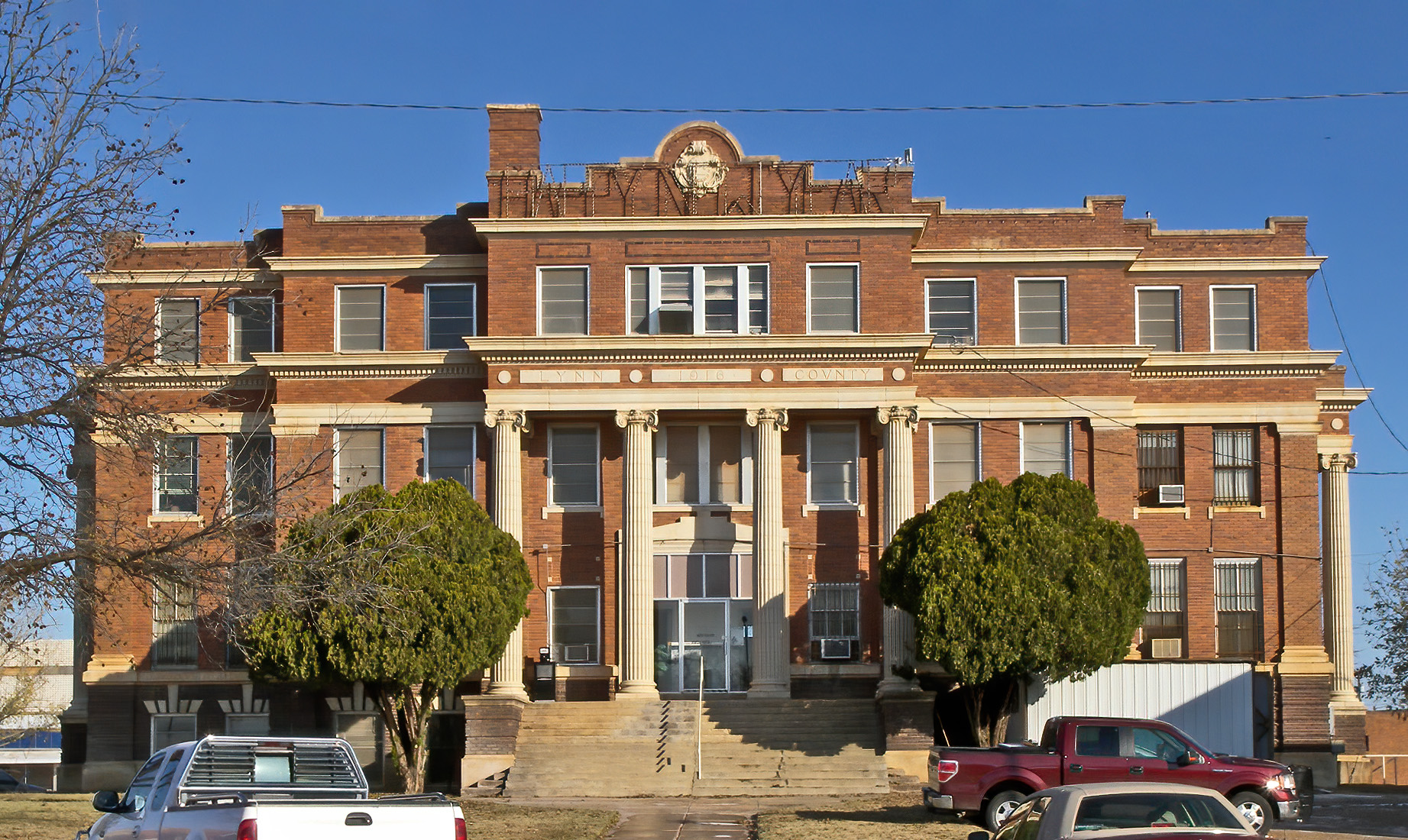

- Location within Texas Location within the United States
- Location: Public Sq., Tahoka, Texas
- Coordinates: 33.16461°N 101.79614°W
- Area: less than one acre
- Built: 1916
- Built by: A.Z. Rodgers
- Architect: W.M. Rice
- Architectural style: Classical Revival
- NRHP reference No.: 82004513
- Added to NRHP: July 8, 1982

The Lynn County Courthouse, on Public Square in Tahoka, Texas in the High Plains region of Texas south of Lubbock, Texas, was built in 1916. It was listed on the National Register of Historic Places in 1982.

It was deemed to be "an outstanding example of the type of public architecture that appeared on the South Plains during the region's formative years." The listing included two contributing buildings: the courthouse, which included a jail when built in 1916, and a separate small jail building constructed in the 1960s. The courthouse is a three-story reinforced concrete structure with red brick veneer, designed in Classical Revival style by architect W.M. Rice. Its facade includes terra cotta, and was built by A.Z. Rodgers.

The building was noted as needing repairs, which led to a $8.2 million project during 2017-2020, with services of Komatsu Architecture and contractor J.C. Stoddard Construction, and supervised by the Texas Historical Commission.

In the renovation,

The county chose to keep one historical reminder in the form of blood stains on a marble wall! On March 8, 1936, sheriff’s deputy F.E. Redwine was moving prisoner Elmo Banks out of his cell in the top floor of the building. Banks managed to overpower the deputy and fatally shoot him with the deputy’s own pistol. Banks took off on foot triggering a massive, two-day manhunt. He was located some 15 miles southwest of Tahoka, arrested, tried, and sent to the electric chair. Redwine’s bloodstain is still visible today, 87 years later, on the wall by the top of a staircase.

It is a State Antiquities Landmark and a Recorded Texas Historic Landmark.

The Lynn County Courthouse is situated on the block bounded by 1st St., 2nd St., Ave. H, and Ave. J in Tahoka.

The architect William M. Rice also designed at least three other places listed on the National Register: the Lipscomb County Courthouse, on Courthouse Square in Lipscomb, Texas; the Warren and Myrta Bacon House, at 1802 Broadway in Lubbock, Texas; and the Shelton-Houghton House, at 1700 Polk St. in Amarillo, Texas.
