= Mayfield Dugout =

Historic 1889 shelter in Texas, United States

- U.S. National Register of Historic Places
- Location within Texas Location within the United States
- Location: About 7 miles (11 km) west-northwest of Silverton, Texas
- Coordinates: 34°30′29″N 101°25′26″W
- Area: 0.5 acres (0.20 ha)
- Built: 1889
- Architectural style: Dugout
- NRHP reference No.: 73001960
- Added to NRHP: June 18, 1973

Mayfield Dugout is a historic dugout on private land in Briscoe County, Texas near Silverton. It was built in 1889. It was added to the National Register of Historic Places in 1973.

It is a dugout with interior dimensions about 15 by 20 feet (4.6 m × 6.1 m) in plan. Its roof is supported by three long beams.

== See also ==
- National Register of Historic Places listings in Briscoe County, Texas
