= National Register of Historic Places listings in Ochiltree County, Texas =

Location of Ochiltree County in Texas

This is a list of the National Register of Historic Places listings in Ochiltree County, Texas.

This is intended to be a complete list of properties and districts listed on the National Register of Historic Places in Ochiltree County, Texas. There are two properties listed on the National Register in the county.

This National Park Service list is complete through NPS recent listings posted March 21, 2025.

== Current listings ==
The publicly disclosed locations of National Register properties may be seen in a mapping service provided.

	Name on the Register	Image	Date listed	Location	City or town	Description
1	Buried City Site (41OC1)	Buried City Site (41OC1)	September 13, 1984 (#84001923)	Address restricted	Perryton	
2	Plainview Hardware Company Building		June 14, 1990 (#90000904)	210 S. Main St. 36°23′53″N 100°48′10″W	Perryton	

== See also ==
- National Register of Historic Places listings in Texas
- Recorded Texas Historic Landmarks in Ochiltree County
