= National Register of Historic Places listings in Collingsworth County, Texas =

List of Historic Places in Collingsworth, Texas

Location of Collingsworth County in Texas

This is a list of the National Register of Historic Places listings in Collingsworth County, Texas.

This is intended to be a complete list of properties and districts listed on the National Register of Historic Places in Collingsworth County, Texas. There are two properties listed on the National Register in the county.

This National Park Service list is complete through NPS recent listings posted March 21, 2025.

== Current listings ==
The locations of National Register properties may be seen in a mapping service provided.

	Name on the Register	Image	Date listed	Location	City or town	Description
1	State Highway 203 (Old TX 52) Bridge at Salt Fork of the Red River		April 14, 2015 (#15000152)	TX 203 at Salt Fork of Red River; 34°53′15″N 100°03′04″W	Wellington vicinity	
2	US 83 Bridge at the Salt Fork of the Red River		October 10, 1996 (#96001117)	US 83, 16 mi. S of Wheeler Cnty. line 34°57′27″N 100°13′16″W	Wellington	Demolished

== See also ==
- National Register of Historic Places listings in Texas
- Recorded Texas Historic Landmarks in Collingsworth County
