= Central Presbyterian Church (Amarillo, Texas) =

Historic church in Texas, United States

- U.S. National Register of Historic Places
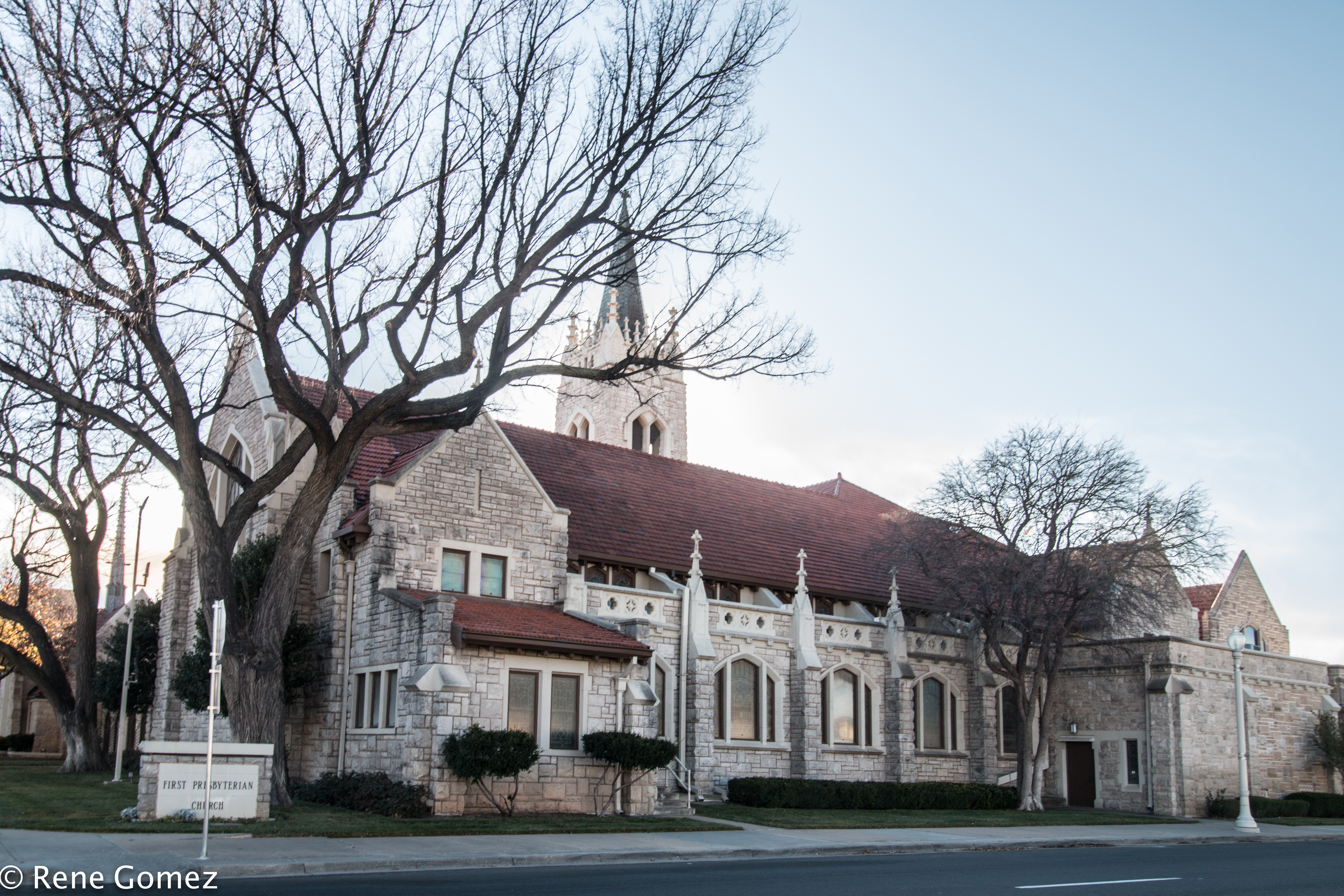
- Central Presbyterian Church in 2017

- Location within Texas Location within the United States
- Location: 1100 Harrison St., Amarillo, Texas
- Coordinates: 35°12′10″N 101°50′26″W
- Area: 1 acre (0.40 ha)
- Architect: Shepard & Wiser, Mont J. Green
- Architectural style: Late Gothic Revival, Tudor Revival
- NRHP reference No.: 91001649
- Added to NRHP: November 13, 1991

Central Presbyterian Church (also known as First Presbyterian Church) is a historic church at 1100 Harrison Street in Amarillo, Texas.

It was built in a Late Gothic Revival, Tudor Revival style and was added to the National Register in 1991.

== See also ==
- National Register of Historic Places listings in Potter County, Texas
