= Shelton-Houghton House =

Coordinates: 35.1953°N 101.8399°W

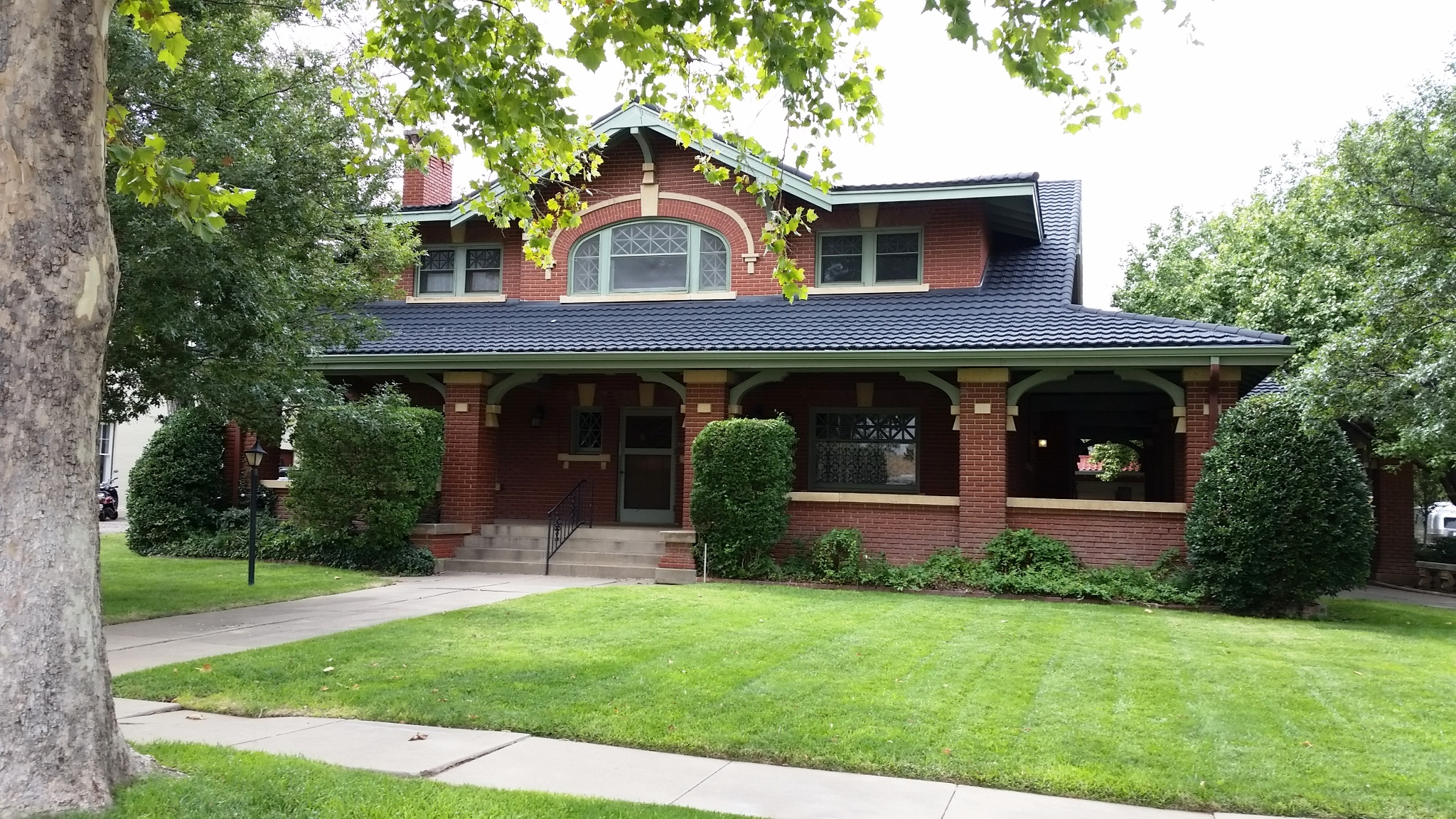

Shelton-Houghton House is a red brick former residence built for cattleman John M. Shelton (1852-1923), a native of Kentucky, in Amarillo, Texas in 1914. The two-story prairie-style building is at 1700 S. Polk Street. It is listed on the National Register of Historic Places. A Texas Historical Marker commemorates its history. The home was designed by Amarillo architect Joseph Champ Berry. It was donated to the Junior League of Amarillo in 1965 and it continues in use with that organization. It is a Texas Historic Landmark.

== See also ==
- National Register of Historic Places listings in Potter County, Texas
- National Register of Historic Places listings in the High Plains region of Texas
- List of Recorded Texas Historic Landmarks (Mason-Rusk)
