= National Register of Historic Places listings in Lipscomb County, Texas =

Location of Lipscomb County in Texas

This is a list of the National Register of Historic Places listings in Lipscomb County, Texas.

This is intended to be a complete list of properties listed on the National Register of Historic Places in Lipscomb County, Texas. There is one property listed on the National Register in the county. This property is also a State Antiquities Landmark and a Recorded Texas Historic Landmark.

This National Park Service list is complete through NPS recent listings posted March 21, 2025.

== Current listings ==
The locations of National Register properties may be seen in a mapping service provided.

	Name on the Register	Image	Date listed	Location	City or town	Description
1	Lipscomb County Courthouse	Lipscomb County Courthouse	July 9, 2008 (#08000730)	Courthouse Square; 36°14′02″N 100°16′14″W	Lipscomb	State Antiquities Landmark, Recorded Texas Historic Landmark

== See also ==
- National Register of Historic Places listings in Texas
- Recorded Texas Historic Landmarks in Lipscomb County
