= Oliver–Eakle–Barfield Building =

Historic building in Amarillo, Texas, U.S.

- U.S. National Register of Historic Places
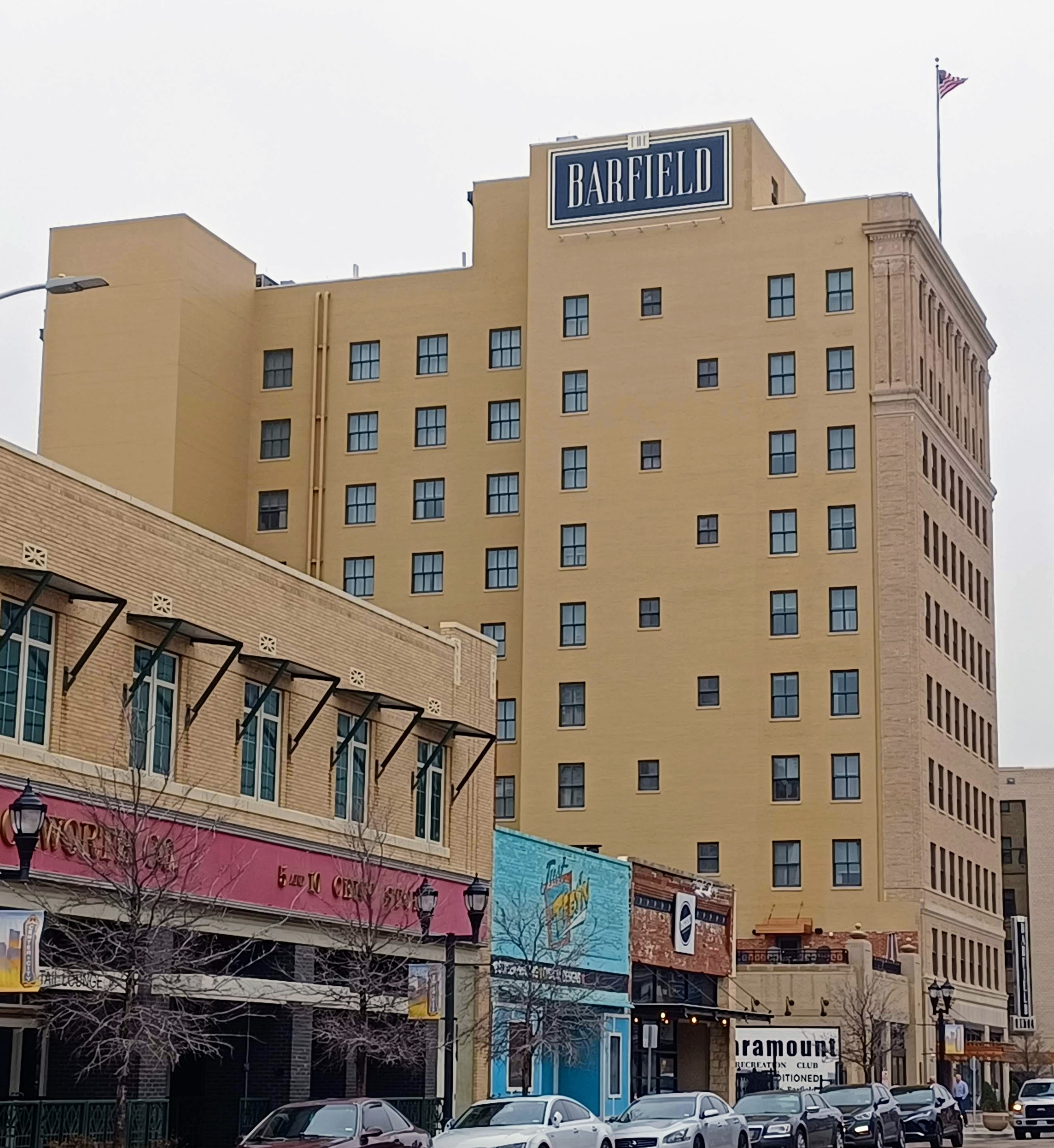
- South side of building seen from S Polk St

- Location within Texas Location within the United States
- Location: 600 S. Polk St., Amarillo, Texas
- Coordinates: 35.20753°N 101.83746°W
- NRHP reference No.: 100003302
- Added to NRHP: January 11, 2019

The Oliver–Eakle–Barfield Building is a historic building at 600 South Polk Street in Amarillo, Texas, United States. Listed on the National Register of Historic Places on January 11, 2019, the building was converted into the Barfield Hotel in 2019.

== See also ==
- National Register of Historic Places listings in Potter County, Texas
