= Dallam County Courthouse =

- U.S. National Register of Historic Places
- Recorded Texas Historic Landmark
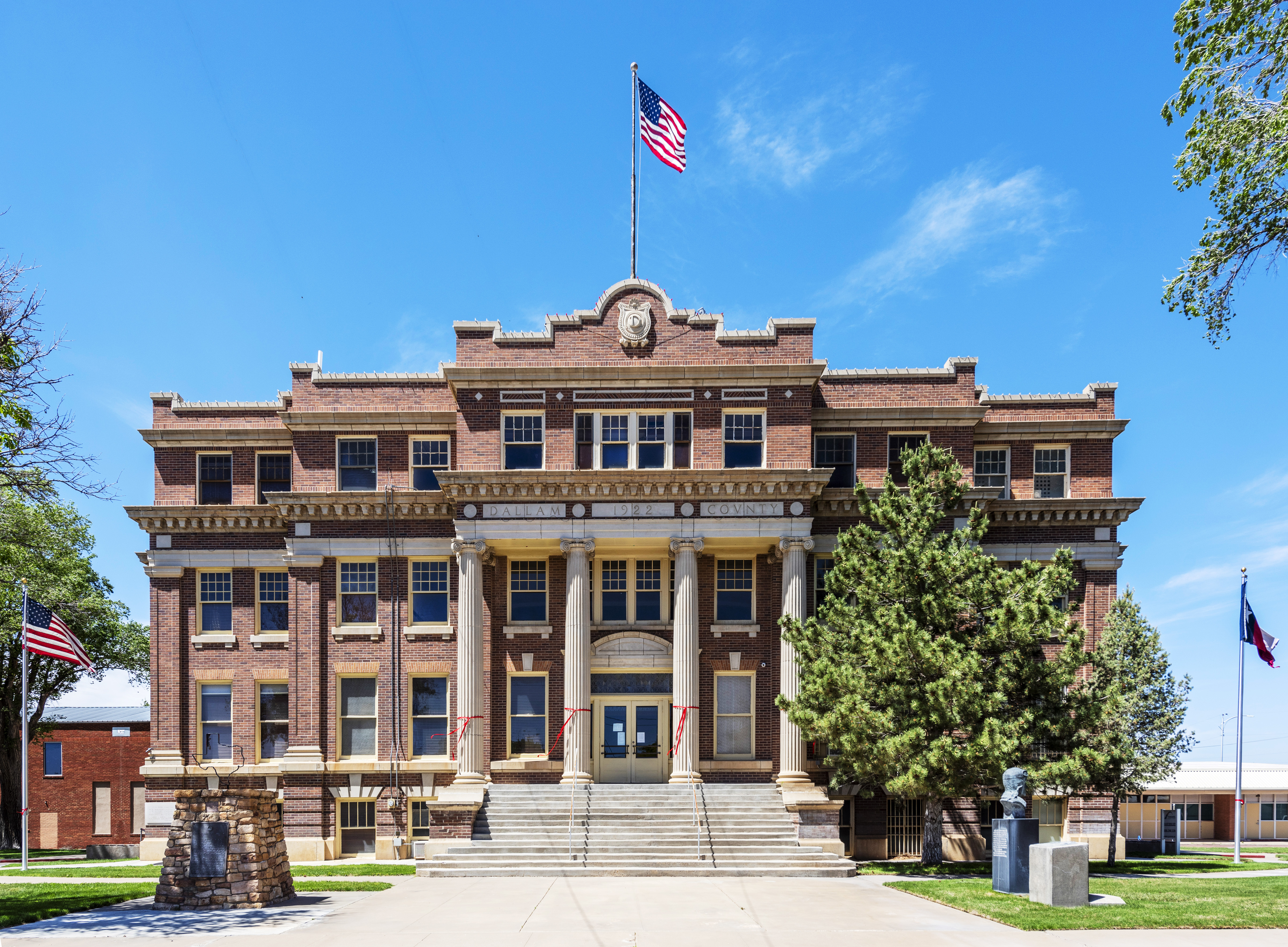
- Dallam County Courthouse

- Location within Texas Location within the United States
- Location: Jct. of Fifth and Denrock Sts., Dalhart, Texas
- Coordinates: 36°3′42″N 102°31′19″W
- Area: less than one acre
- Built: 1923
- Architect: J. Roy Smith, Et al.
- Architectural style: Classical Revival
- NRHP reference No.: 92001375
- RTHL No.: 13284

Significant dates
- Added to NRHP: October 15, 1992
- Designated RTHL: 1991

The Dallam County Courthouse, at Fifth and Denrock Sts. in Dalhart, Texas, is a historic courthouse that was built in 1923. It was designed by J. Roy Smith in Classical Revival style. It was listed on the National Register of Historic Places in 1992.

It replaced a 1903 building; it was funded by a bond approved by voters in 1922. It was designed by Smith and Townes. It is made of brick with cast stone detailing, and serves the county still.

== See also ==
- National Register of Historic Places listings in Dallam County, Texas
- Recorded Texas Historic Landmarks in Dallam County
- List of county courthouses in Texas
