= US 83 Bridge at the Salt Fork of the Red River =

- U.S. National Register of Historic Places
- Location within Texas Location within the United States
- Nearest city: Wellington, Texas
- Coordinates: 34°57′28″N 100°13′15″W
- Area: less than one acre
- Built: 1939
- Built by: Pittsburgh-Des Moines Steel Co. Texas Highway Department
- Architectural style: Parker through truss bridge
- MPS: Historic Bridges of Texas MPS
- NRHP reference No.: 96001117
- Added to NRHP: October 10, 1996

The US 83 Bridge at the Salt Fork of the Red River, bringing US 83 across the Salt Fork Red River near Wellington, Texas, was a truss bridge built in 1939. It was built at the location of a near capture of Bonnie and Clyde, whose car plunged into the river in 1933. Upon their being rescued, local sheriff's staff were held up by Bonnie. It was a work of the Pittsburgh-Des Moines Steel Co. and the Texas highway Department. It was a Parker-through truss bridge with open steel railing and approach spans from the previous bridge. It has also been denoted CG0031-03-002.

It was listed on the National Register of Historic Places in 1996.

Originally the only bridge across the river, TxDOT added a supplementary bridge when the highway was divided in 1974 that carried southbound traffic while it carried northbound traffic.

The bridge was demolished in 2012 and the replacement bridge was completed in early 2013.

== See also ==
- National Register of Historic Places listings in Collingsworth County, Texas
