= National Register of Historic Places listings in Briscoe County, Texas =

Location of Briscoe County in Texas

This is a list of the National Register of Historic Places listings in Briscoe County, Texas.

This is intended to be a complete list of properties listed on the National Register of Historic Places in Briscoe County, Texas. There are two properties listed on the National Register within the county.

This National Park Service list is complete through NPS recent listings posted September 26, 2025.

== Current listings ==
The locations of National Register properties may be seen in a mapping service provided.

	Name on the Register	Image	Date listed	Location	City or town	Description
1	Lake Theo Folsom Site Complex	Lake Theo Folsom Site Complex	April 28, 1975 (#75001960)	Caprock Canyons State Park; 34°24′48″N 101°04′00″W	Quitaque	Primarily located on the southern side of Lake Theo
2	Mayfield Dugout		June 18, 1973 (#73001960)	7 mi. NW of Silverton; 34°30′29″N 101°25′26″W	Silverton	

== See also ==
- National Register of Historic Places listings in Texas
- Recorded Texas Historic Landmarks in Briscoe County
