= Plainview Hardware Company Building =

- U.S. National Register of Historic Places
- Location within Texas Location within the United States
- Location: 210 S. Main St., Perryton, Texas
- Coordinates: 36°23′53″N 100°48′10″W
- Area: less than one acre
- Built: 1930
- Architect: Joseph Champ Berry
- Architectural style: Art Deco
- NRHP reference No.: 90000904
- Added to NRHP: June 14, 1990

The Plainview Hardware Company Building, at 210 S. Main St. in Perryton, Texas, is a building listed on the National Register of Historic Places in 1990.

It is a two-story masonry Art Deco-style construction, with a dressed limestone veneer on its front and common bond brick on its sides and rear. It is 25 by 140 feet (7.6 m × 42.7 m) in plan. The Art Deco style is expressed by carved limestone with bas relief detailing creating angular geometric forms, including some squares, and floral motifs.

== See also ==
- National Register of Historic Places listings in Ochiltree County, Texas
