= Santa Fe Building (Amarillo, Texas) =

- U.S. National Register of Historic Places
- Recorded Texas Historic Landmark
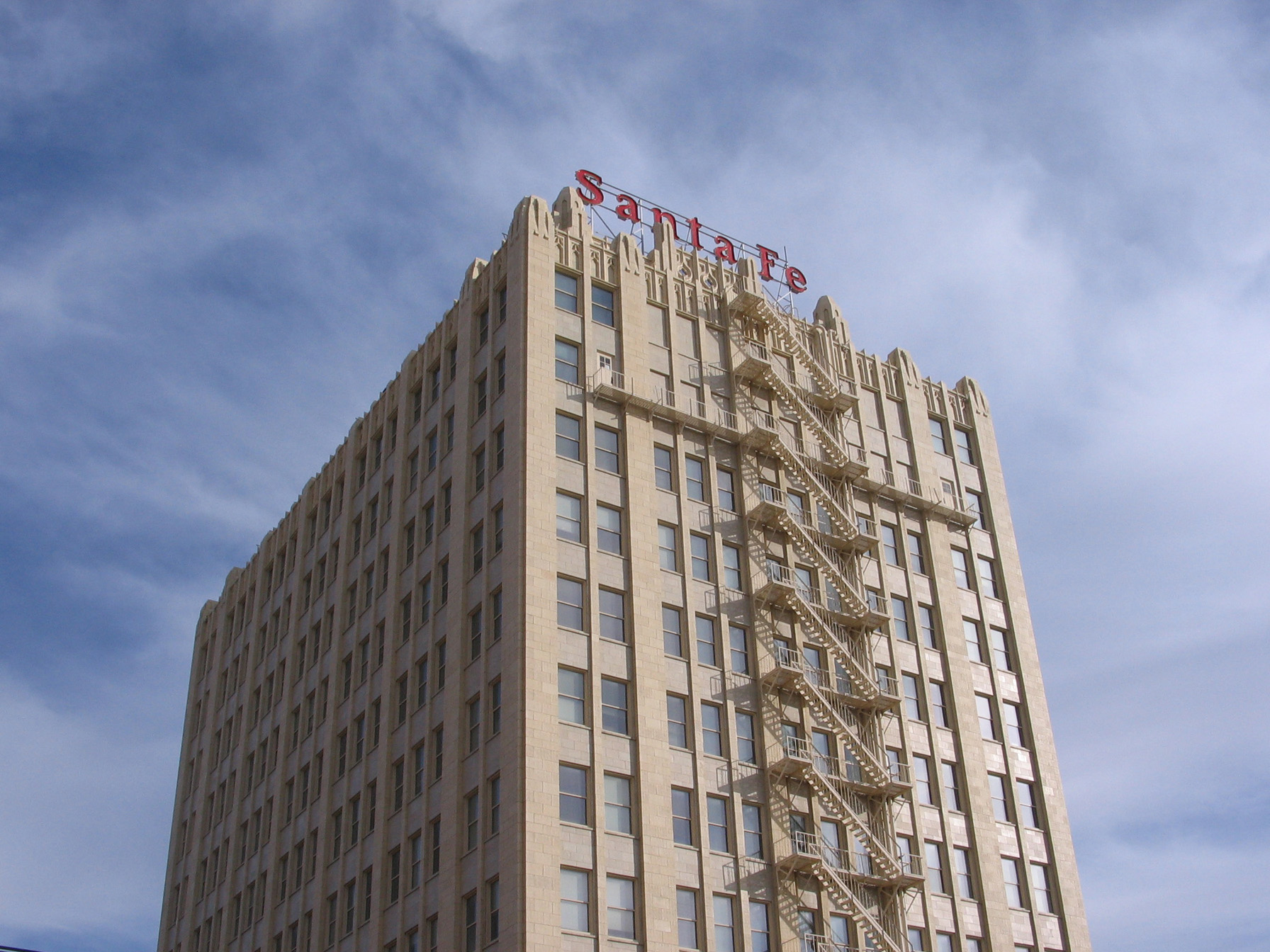
- Santa Fe Building

- Location within Texas Location within the United States
- Location: 900 S. Polk St. Amarillo, Texas
- Coordinates: 35°12′16″N 101°50′15″W
- Area: less than one acre
- Built: 1928
- Built by: Brennan Construction Company
- Architect: E.A. Harrison
- Architectural style: Late Gothic Revival
- NRHP reference No.: 96000939
- RTHL No.: 4574

Significant dates
- Added to NRHP: August 22. 1996
- Designated RTHL: 1996

The Santa Fe Building is one of the oldest buildings in downtown Amarillo, Texas, U.S.A. It was completed on January 18, 1930, and had the regional offices of the Atchison, Topeka and Santa Fe Railway company. The Amarillo office of the railroad company supervised more than 5,800 miles (9,334 km) of railroads. Brennan Construction Company of Amarillo and Dallas built the building from 1928 to 1930 with an original construction cost of US$1.5 million.

The building was vacant more than a decade in the 1990s, until Potter County bought it for $426,000 to gain new office spaces in 1995. It was reopened in 2000, after Potter County spent approximately $14.1 million on renovating the building.

== See also ==
- List of tallest buildings in Amarillo
- National Register of Historic Places listings in Potter County, Texas
- Recorded Texas Historic Landmarks in Potter County
