= Ranchotel =

- U.S. National Register of Historic Places
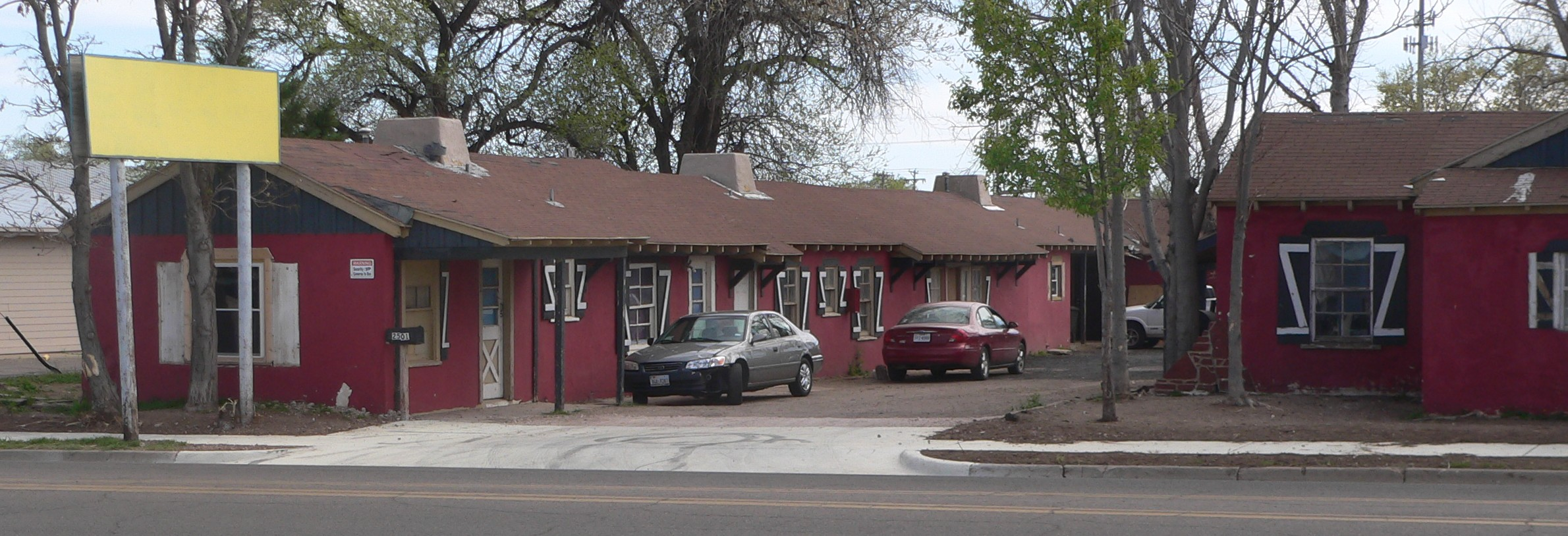
- Ranchotel

- Location within Texas Location within the United States
- Location: 2501 W. Sixth Ave. Amarillo, Texas
- Coordinates: 35°12′40″N 101°51′54″W
- Built: 1940
- Built by: Randall Construction Company
- Architect: Randall Construction Company
- Architectural style: Pueblo
- NRHP reference No.: 95000411
- Added to NRHP: April 14, 1995

The Ranchotel is a motel in Amarillo, Texas. The building was completed in 1940, and was popular with travelers using the historic U.S. Route 66.

The building was added to the National Register of Historic Places on April 14, 1995.

== See also ==
- List of tallest buildings in Amarillo
- National Register of Historic Places listings in Potter County, Texas
