= Amarillo Building =

Historic office building in Texas, US

- U.S. National Register of Historic Places
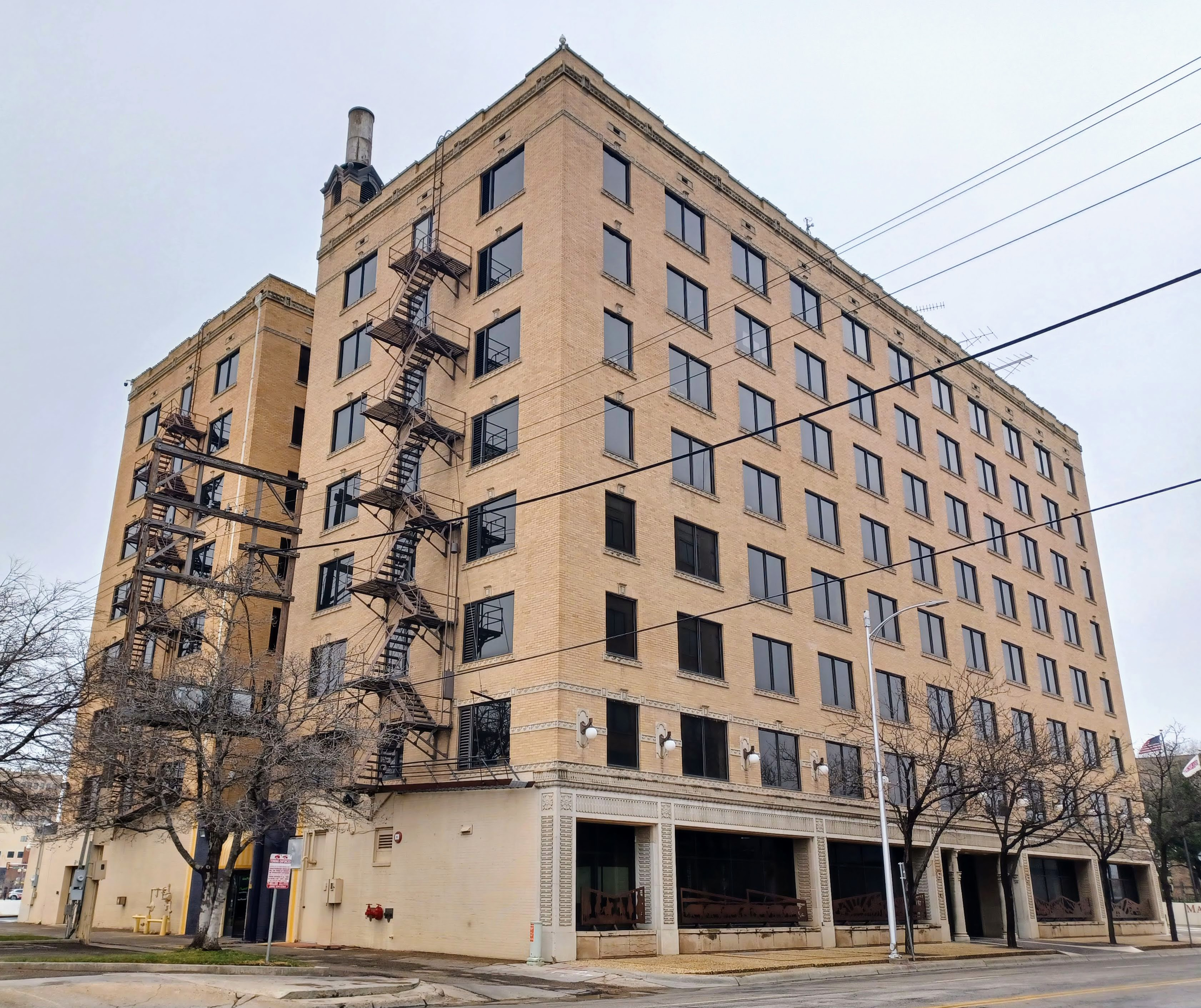
- The Amarillo Building in 2024

- Location within Texas
- Coordinates: 35°12′38″N 101°50′11″W
- NRHP reference No.: 100002131
- Added to NRHP: February 23, 2018

The Amarillo Building, at 301 S Polk Street, is a historic office building in Amarillo, Texas, United States.

== History ==
The Amarillo Building was constructed in the mid-1920s by the Shepard & Wiser architectural firm. With two towers, it is considered the oldest skyscraper in Amarillo. It was added to the National Register of Historic Places on February 23, 2018.

== Gallery ==
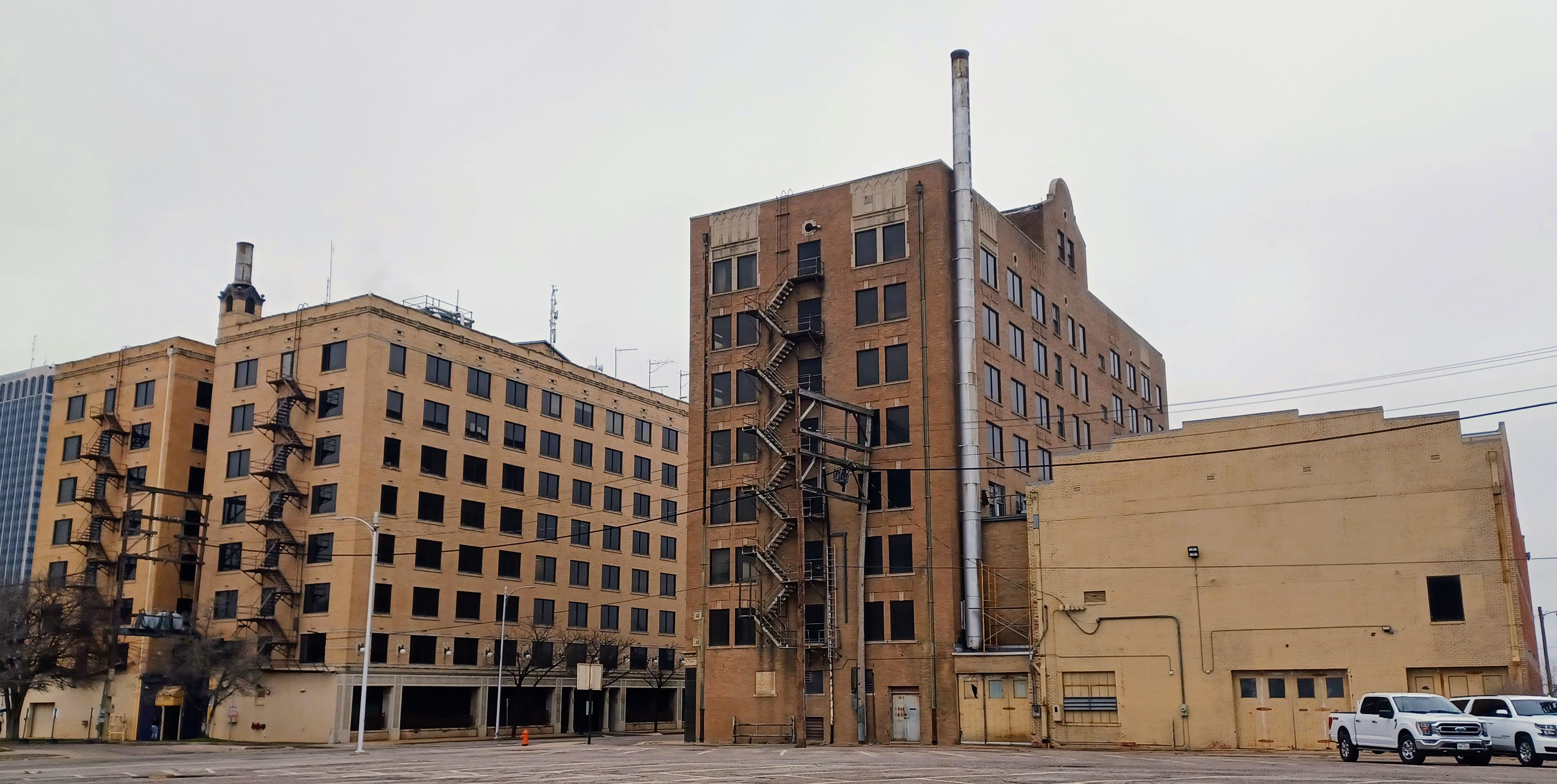

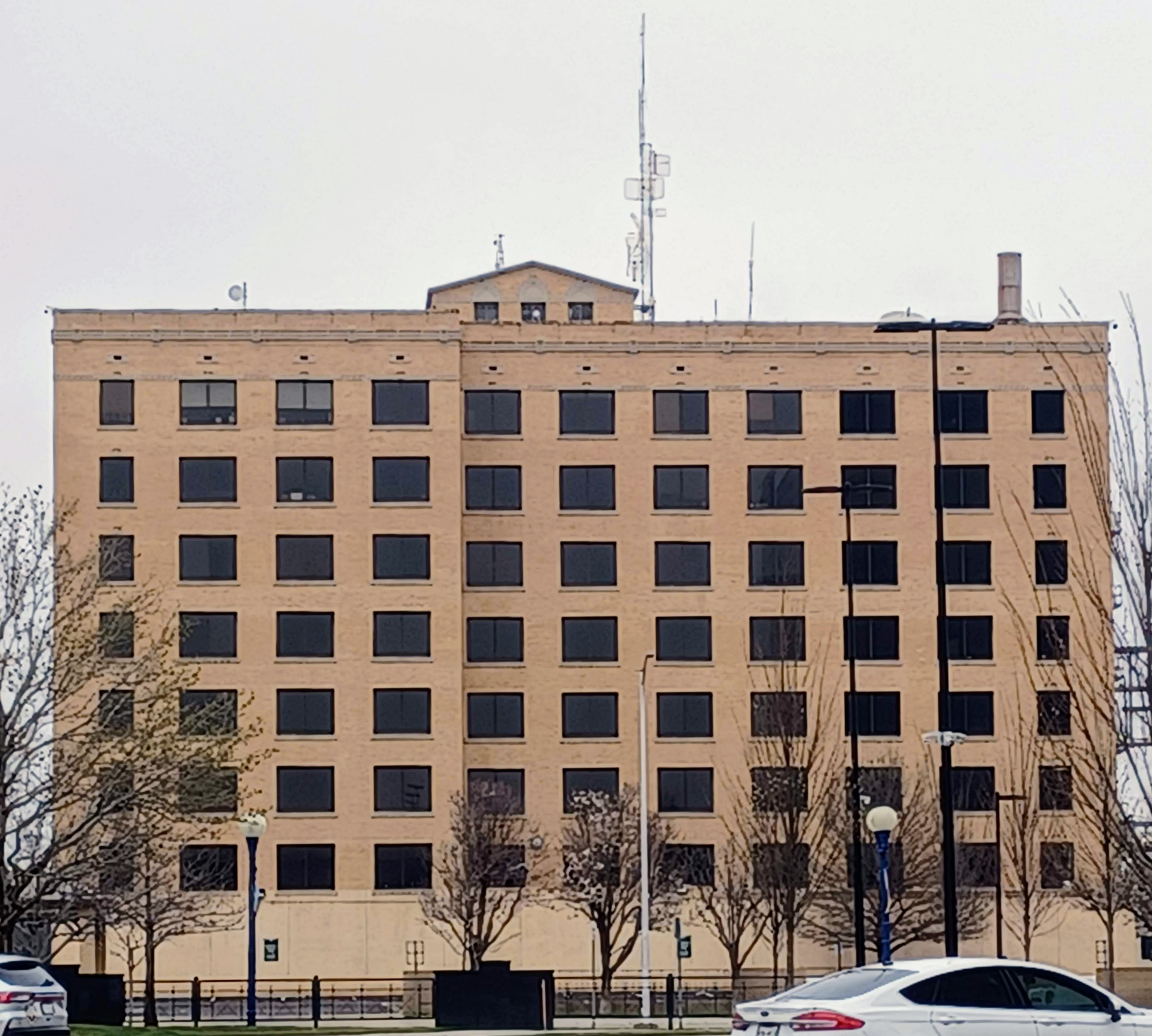

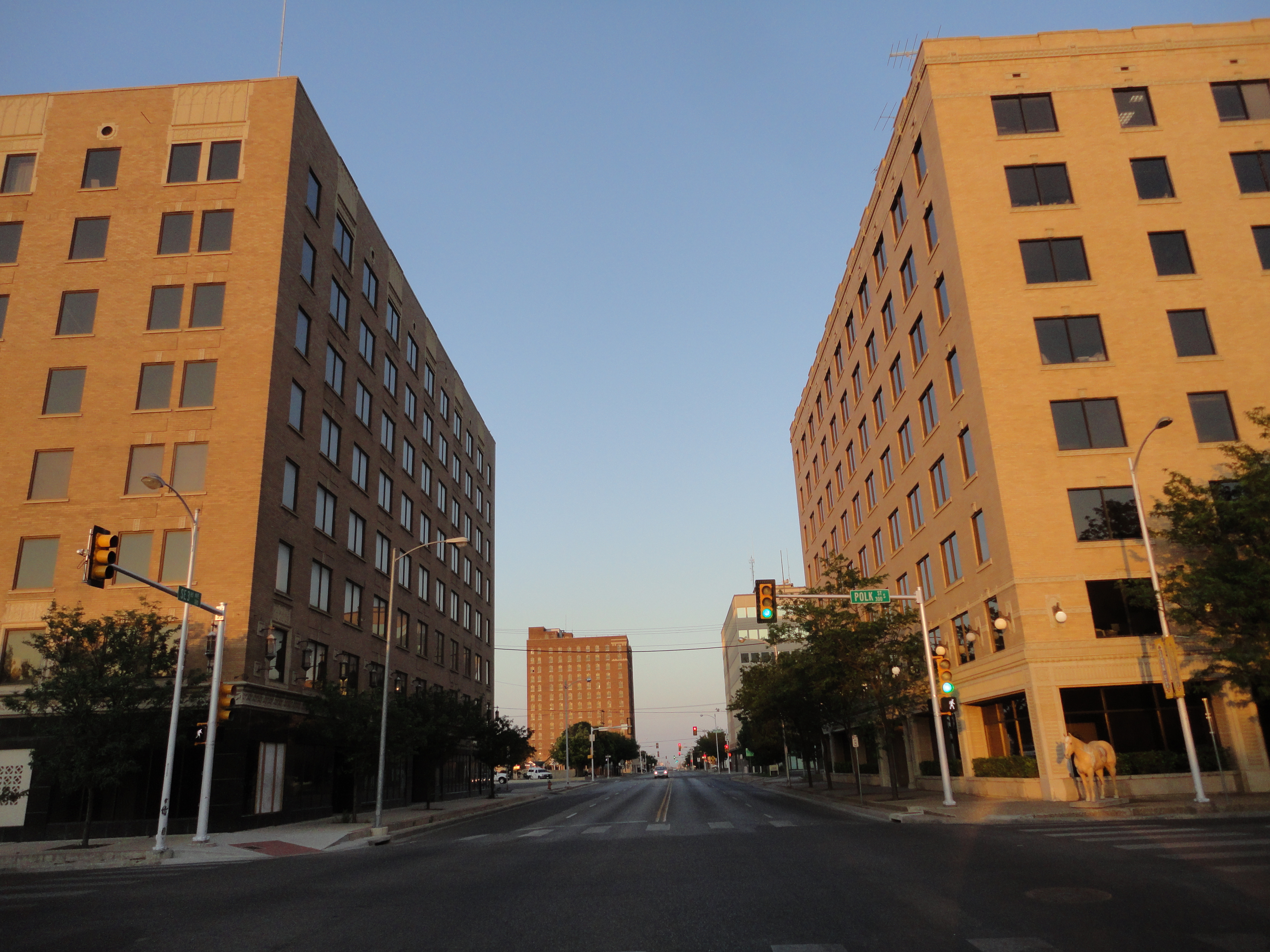

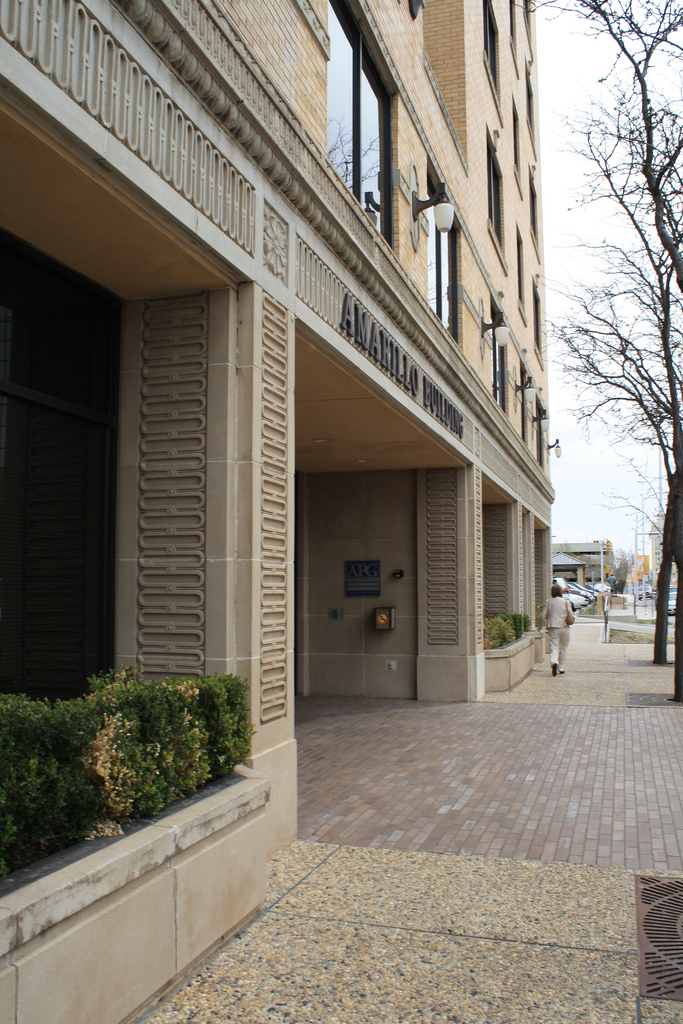
