= McBride Ranch House =

Historic house in Texas, US

- U.S. National Register of Historic Places
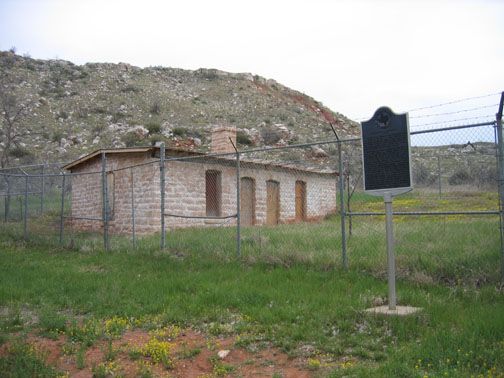
- The McBride Ranch House in 2005

- Location within Texas
- Coordinates: 35°32′29″N 101°43′44″W
- NRHP reference No.: 75000152
- Added to NRHP: April 23, 1975

The McBride Ranch House is a historic house in Amarillo, Texas, United States.

== History ==
The house was built in 1904 by rancher David Nichols McBride, who bought the surrounding land in 1904, for $1.50 per acre. The house is made of mortared dolomite, and has two rooms–a kitchen and bedroom, as well as an incomplete porch. After McBride died, his son Amos inherited the property, who used the house to brew moonshine. He sold it United States Bureau of Reclamation in the 1960s.

The oldest ranch house in Potter County, Texas, it was added to the National Register of Historic Places on April 23, 1975.
