= National Register of Historic Places listings in Childress County, Texas =

Location of Childress County in Texas

This is a list of the National Register of Historic Places listings in Childress County, Texas.

This is intended to be a complete list of properties and districts listed on the National Register of Historic Places in Childress County, Texas. There is one district listed on the National Register in the county. The district contains Recorded Texas Historic Landmarks.

This National Park Service list is complete through NPS recent listings posted March 21, 2025.

== Current listings ==
The locations of National Register properties and districts may be seen in a mapping service provided.

	Name on the Register	Image	Date listed	Location	City or town	Description
1	Childress Commercial and Civic Historic District	Childress Commercial and Civic Historic District	June 7, 2016 (#16000349)	Roughly bounded by 3rd St., NW., Aves. A & I, 2nd St., NE., Fair Park & 810 Ave. I NE. 34°25′24″N 100°12′24″W	Childress	Includes Recorded Texas Historic Landmarks

== See also ==
- National Register of Historic Places listings in Texas
- Recorded Texas Historic Landmarks in Childress County
