= N34 (aircraft) =

Douglas DC-3 aircraft in Texas, US

- Douglas DC-3 Airplane, N34
- U.S. National Register of Historic Places
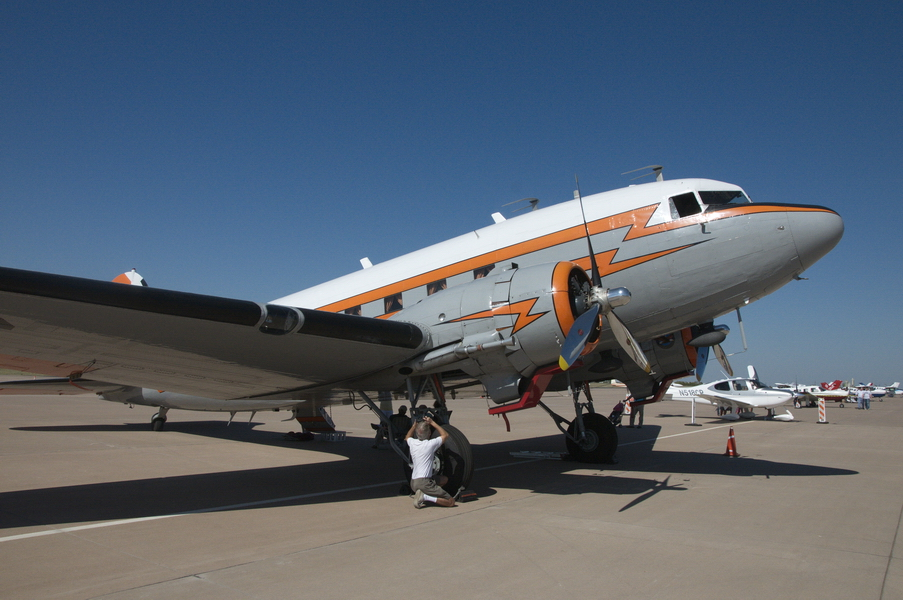
- N34 at Max Westheimer Airport in 2010

- Location within Texas Location within the United States
- Location: Texas Air & Space Museum, 10001 American Drive, Amarillo, Texas
- Coordinates: 35°12′48″N 101°42′53″W
- Area: less than one acre
- Built: 1945
- Built by: Douglas Aircraft Company
- NRHP reference No.: 97000443
- Added to NRHP: May 29, 1997

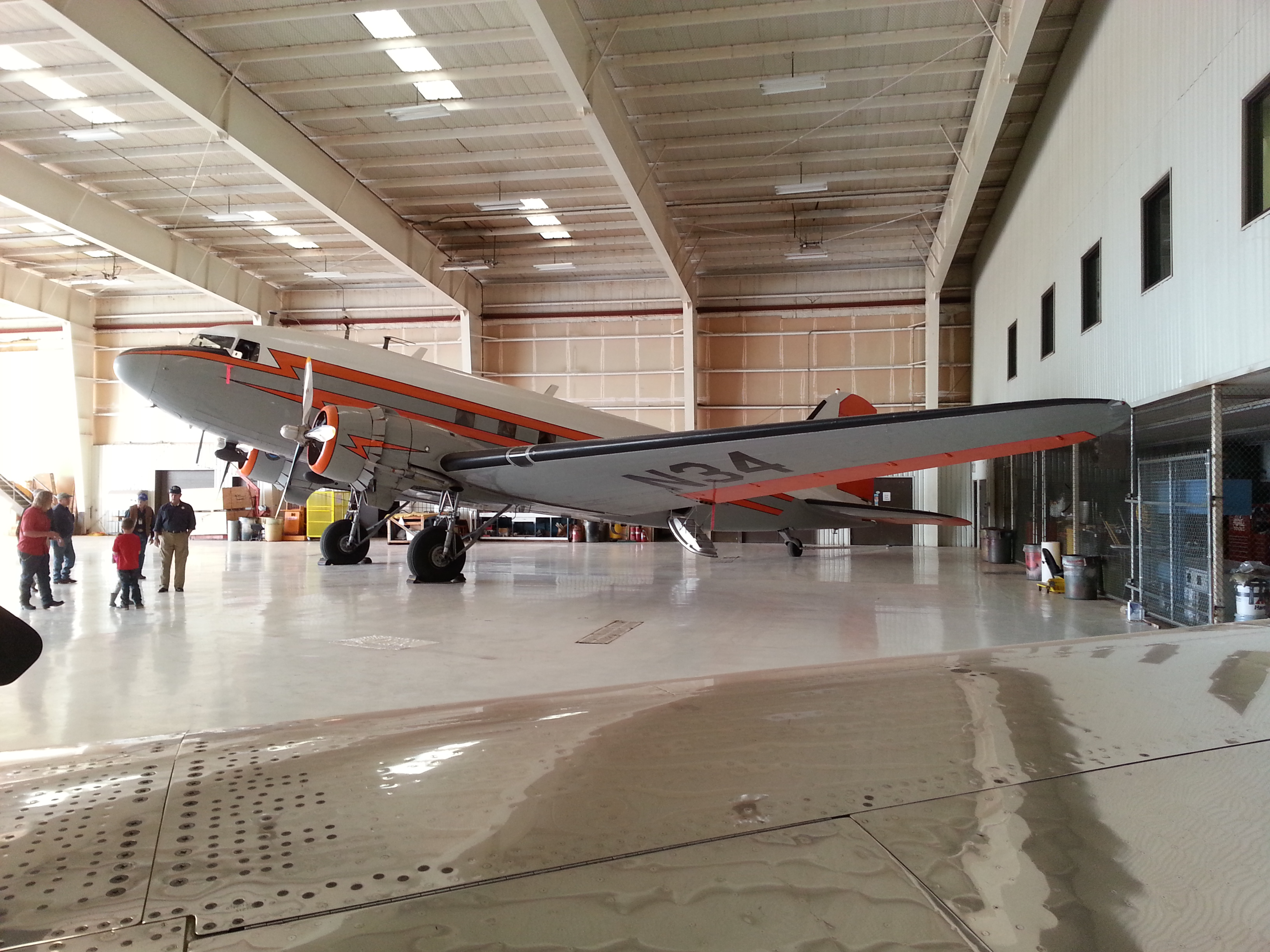
N34 at its current home at the Texas Air & Space Museum

N34 is a Douglas DC-3 airplane currently based at the Texas Air & Space Museum in Amarillo, Texas. The airplane was built in May 1945 at Douglas' Tinker Air Force Base facility for use by the U.S. Navy. The Navy used the plane for transport flights in the post-World War II era; its missions included flights into Germany during the Berlin Airlift. After the Navy retired the aircraft in the 1950s, the Civil Aeronautics Administration purchased it along with several other Navy DC-3s for use in flight inspections. The fleet of DC-3s helped the CAA (and its successor the Federal Aviation Administration) standardize its flight inspection process; historically, its flight inspection fleet had been small and used whatever planes were available due to the agency's limited budget. The FAA used its DC-3s to inspect and calibrate navigation aids until 1981, when they were replaced by more modern jet aircraft; N34 was the last of the DC-3s to be retired. In 1985, the FAA repurposed N34 as a public education aircraft used at airshows; it was based at Mike Monroney Aeronautical Center in Oklahoma City.

The airplane was listed on the National Register of Historic Places on May 29, 1997. In 2014, the FAA relocated the plane to its current home at the Texas Air & Space Museum.
