= Warren and Myrta Bacon House =

Historic house in Texas, United States

- U.S. National Register of Historic Places
- Recorded Texas Historic Landmark
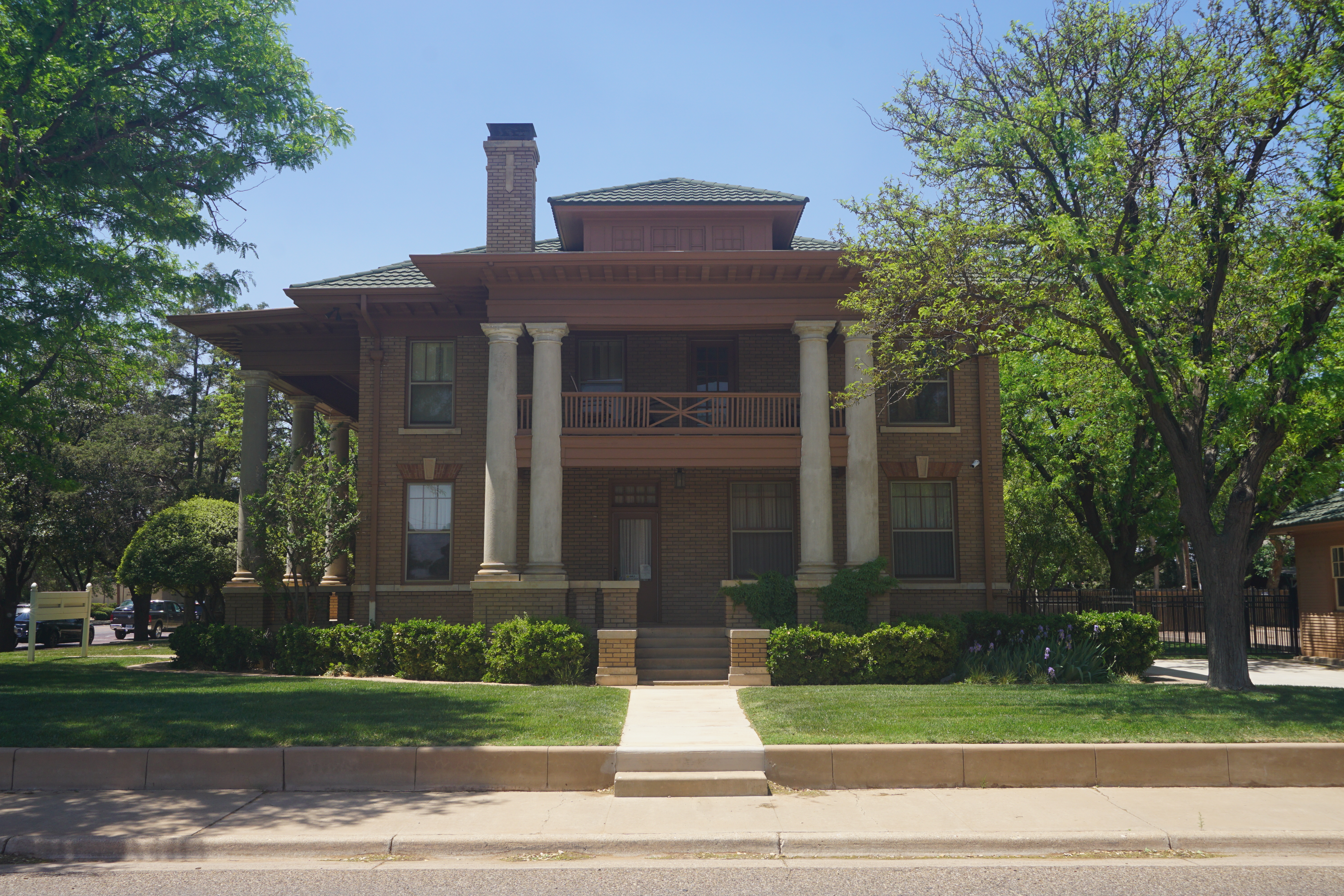
- View of the east side

- Location within Texas Location within the United States
- Location: 1802 Broadway; Lubbock, Texas
- Coordinates: 33°35′6″N 101°51′23″W
- Area: less than one acre
- Built: 1916
- Architect: W.M. Rice
- Architectural style: Colonial Revival
- NRHP reference No.: 82004512
- RTHL No.: 273

Significant dates
- Added to NRHP: July 15, 1982
- Designated RTHL: 1982

The Warren and Myrta Bacon House, 1802 Broadway, Lubbock, Texas, United States, was designed and built from plans by W. M. Rice of Amarillo, Texas, in 1916. It was designed along neo-classical lines for Warren A. Bacon, a successful local businessman and civic leader. The house was placed on the National Register of Historic Places in 1982.

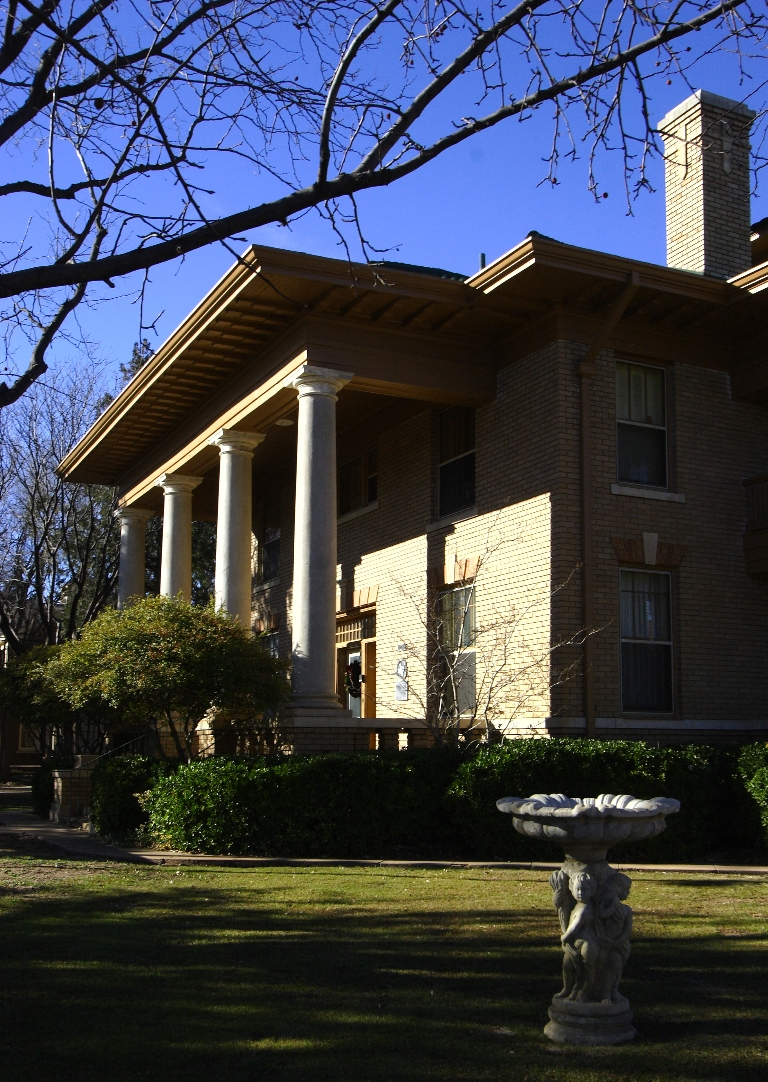
View from the southeast

== Owners ==
- Warren Bacon lived in Lubbock from 1893 and resided in this house from its construction until his death in 1938.
- Mrs. Myrta Bacon, daughter of George M. Hunt, lived in here from its construction until her death in 1967.
- In 1981, the Episcopal Diocese of Northwest Texas acquired the house and remains the present owner.

== See also ==
- National Register of Historic Places listings in Lubbock County, Texas
- Recorded Texas Historic Landmarks in Lubbock County
