= Texas Air & Space Museum =

- Established: 1989
- Location: Rick Husband Amarillo International Airport, in Amarillo, Texas
- Coordinates: 35.2137°N 101.7141°W
- Type: Aviation Museum
- Visitors: 8,400+ yearly
- Director: Ron Fernuik
- Curator: Paul Devenney
- Website: Texas Air & Space Museum

The Texas Air & Space Museum is an aviation museum located near Rick Husband Amarillo International Airport in Amarillo, Texas. The museum displays civilian and military aircraft and artifacts relating to aviation and space exploration. In August 2025, it had 11 aircraft on display and another 30 in storage, according to KVII.

== History ==
In 1989, a group of aviation enthusiasts in Amarillo formed an air and space museum at private Tradewind Airport in southeast Amarillo. In 1997, the museum moved from Tradewind Airport to the Amarillo International Airport (later Rick Husband Amarillo International Airport) and into old buildings that, for most of the years from 1929 through 1972, served as Amarillo's commercial air terminal, first as English Field, then as English Airport, and finally as Amarillo Air Terminal. When the ongoing maintenance costs of English Field's old terminal building and hangars became too great for the museum and city to bear, English Field Air & Space Museum relinquished 13 of its 14 aircraft to other museums, moved its artifacts into storage, and in 2007, closed its doors.

In February 2010, the museum changed its name to Texas Air & Space Museum, acquired indoor and outdoor exhibit space at the Rick Husband Amarillo International Airport, and reopened its doors. On opening day February 15, 2011, Texas Air & Space Museum had a significant number of indoor air and space historical displays and three aircraft—a North American P-51D Mustang, a de Havilland DHC-2 Beaver on floats, and a de Havilland DHC-4 C-7 Caribou.

In July 2011, the museum acquired the locally built Speed Johnson racing aircraft, known as the F8F Beercat and registered as a Speed Johnson F4F Bearcat. On September 21, 2011, NASA’s Gulfstream II Shuttle Training Aircraft, designated NASA 946 and registered as N946NA, arrived at the museum on its final flight. The aircraft had been flown by Rick Husband, the Amarillo-born astronaut after whom the airport is named.

On February 13, 2014, a Douglas DC-3 registered as N34 arrived at the museum from Oklahoma City. The aircraft had previously served with the United States Navy and subsequently with the Civil Aeronautics Administration and Federal Aviation Administration as a flight-inspection aircraft used to calibrate radio navigation aids.

In August 2025, the museum announced plans for an expansion on a 22-acre site. KVII reported that the museum displayed 11 aircraft and had another 30 in storage because of space constraints. Museum president Ron Fernuik estimated that the first phase, including refurbishment of an existing building, construction of a new building and infrastructure work, would cost approximately $5.2 million. Additional funding was still required.

== Exhibits ==
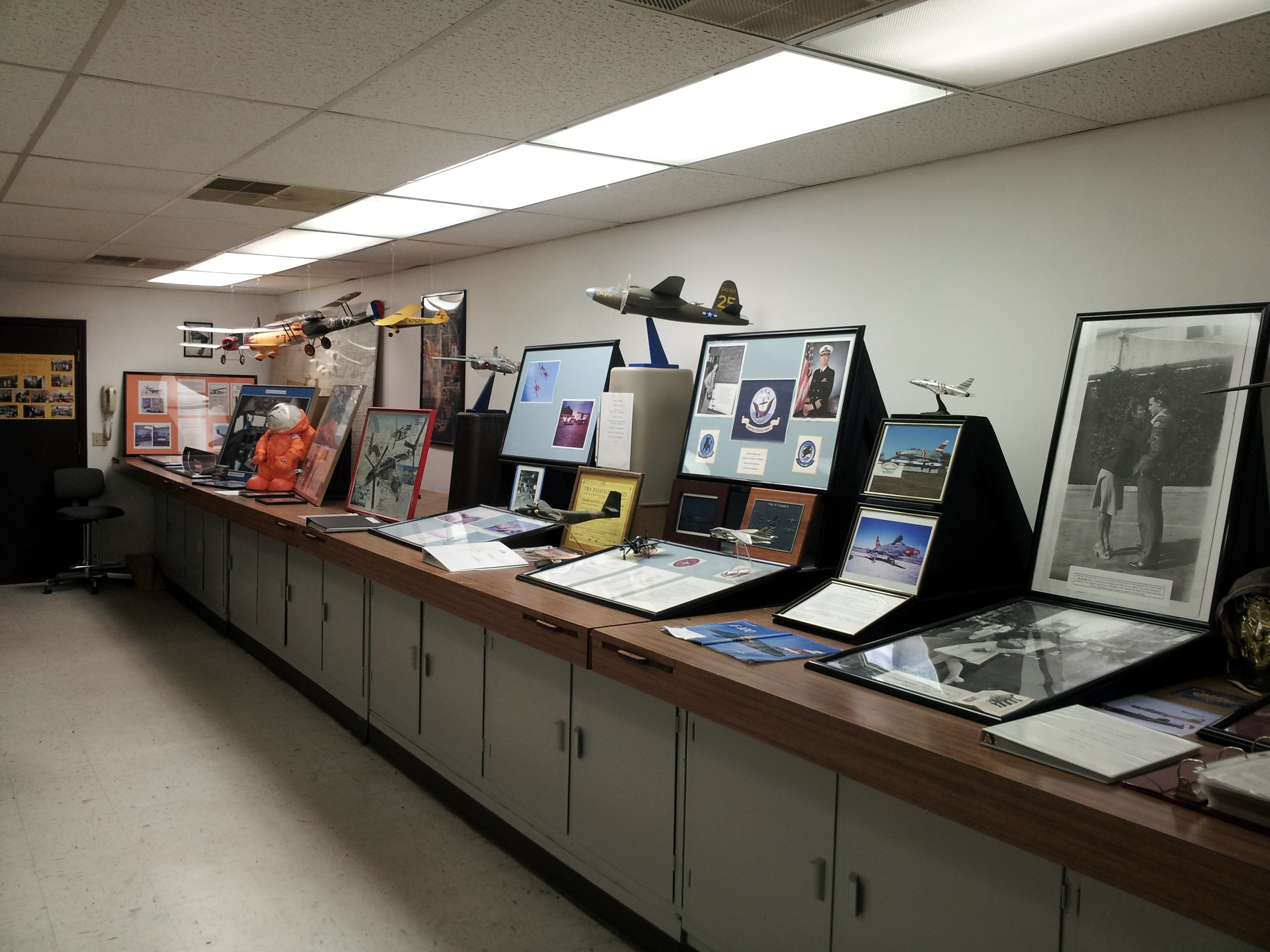
Indoor exhibits on the east wall of room 101

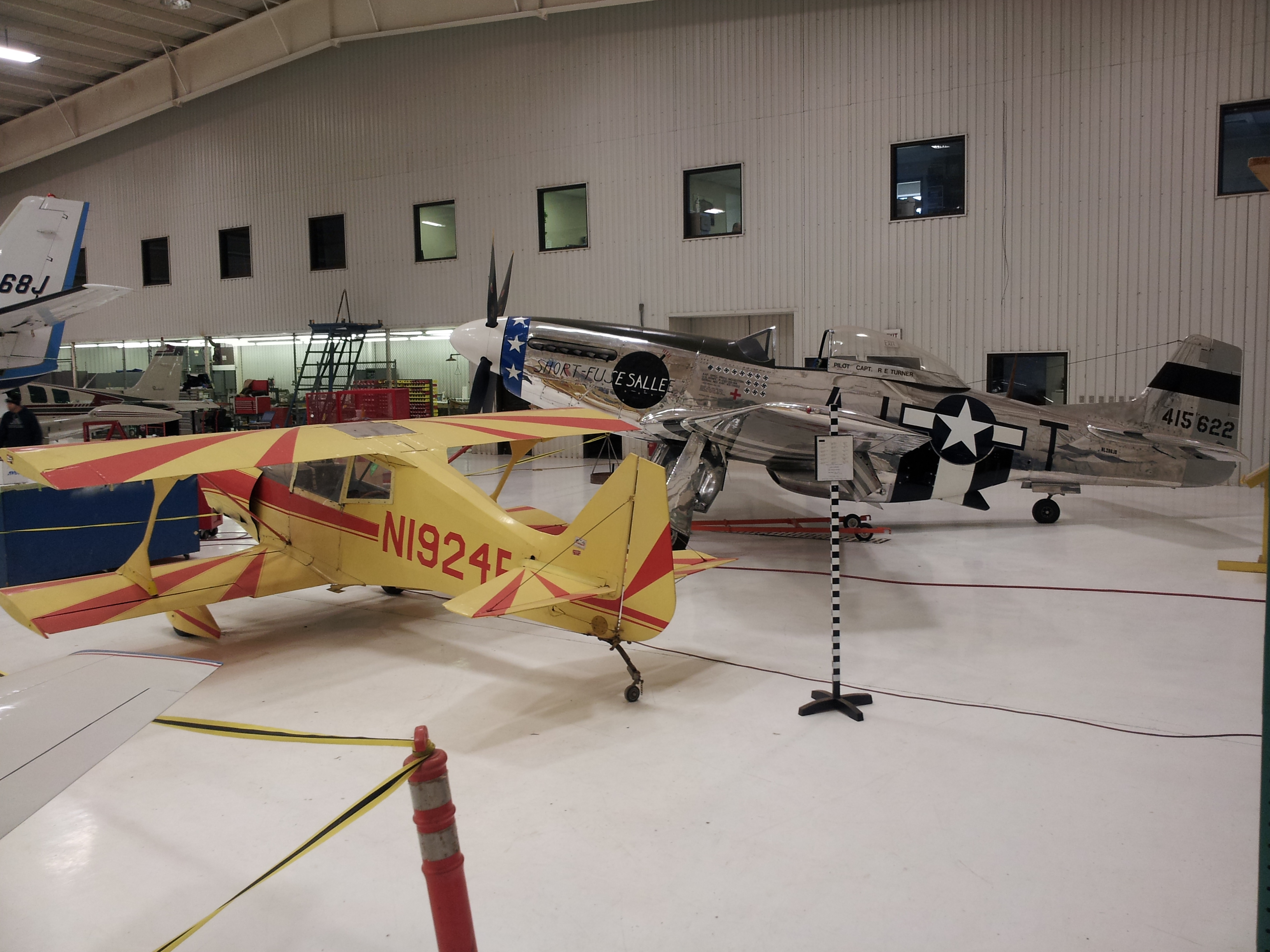
The Speed Johnson F8F Beercat and the North American P-51D Mustang

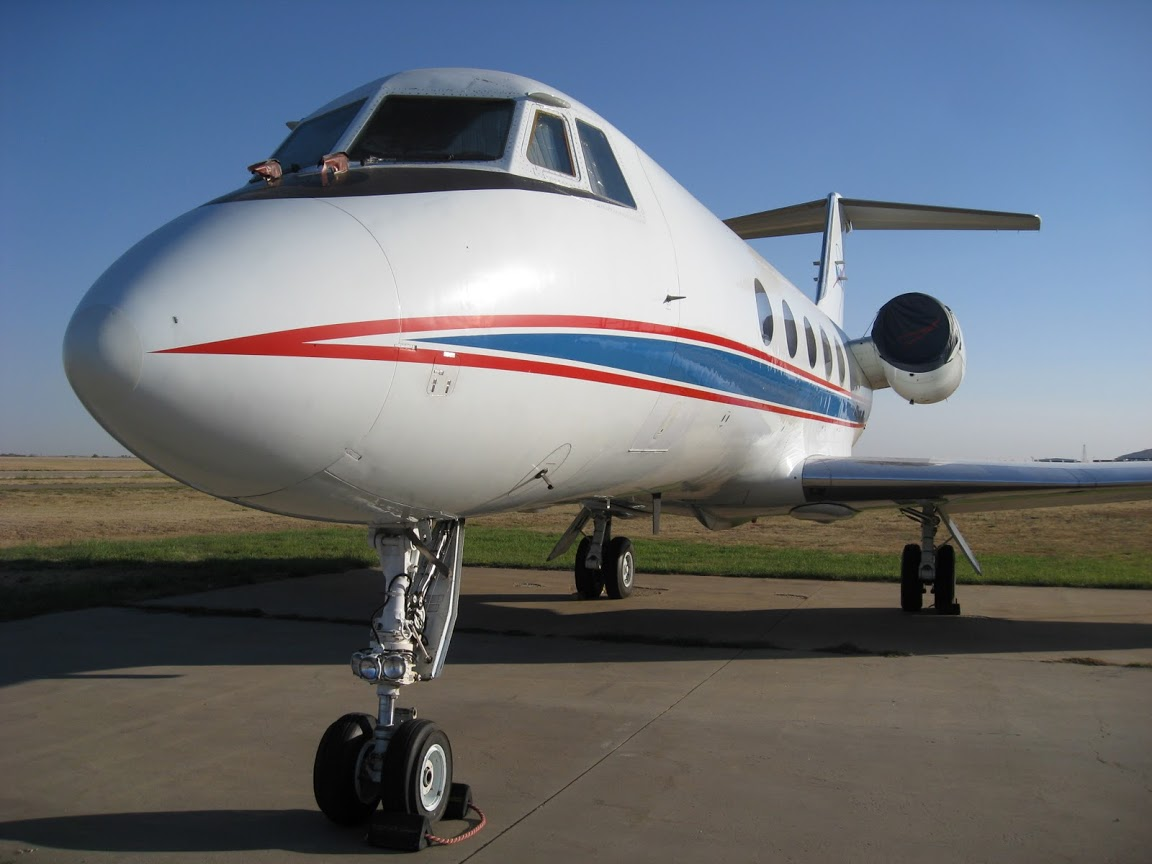
NASA 946, a Gulfstream II Shuttle Training Aircraft registered as N946NA, arrived at the museum on September 21, 2011

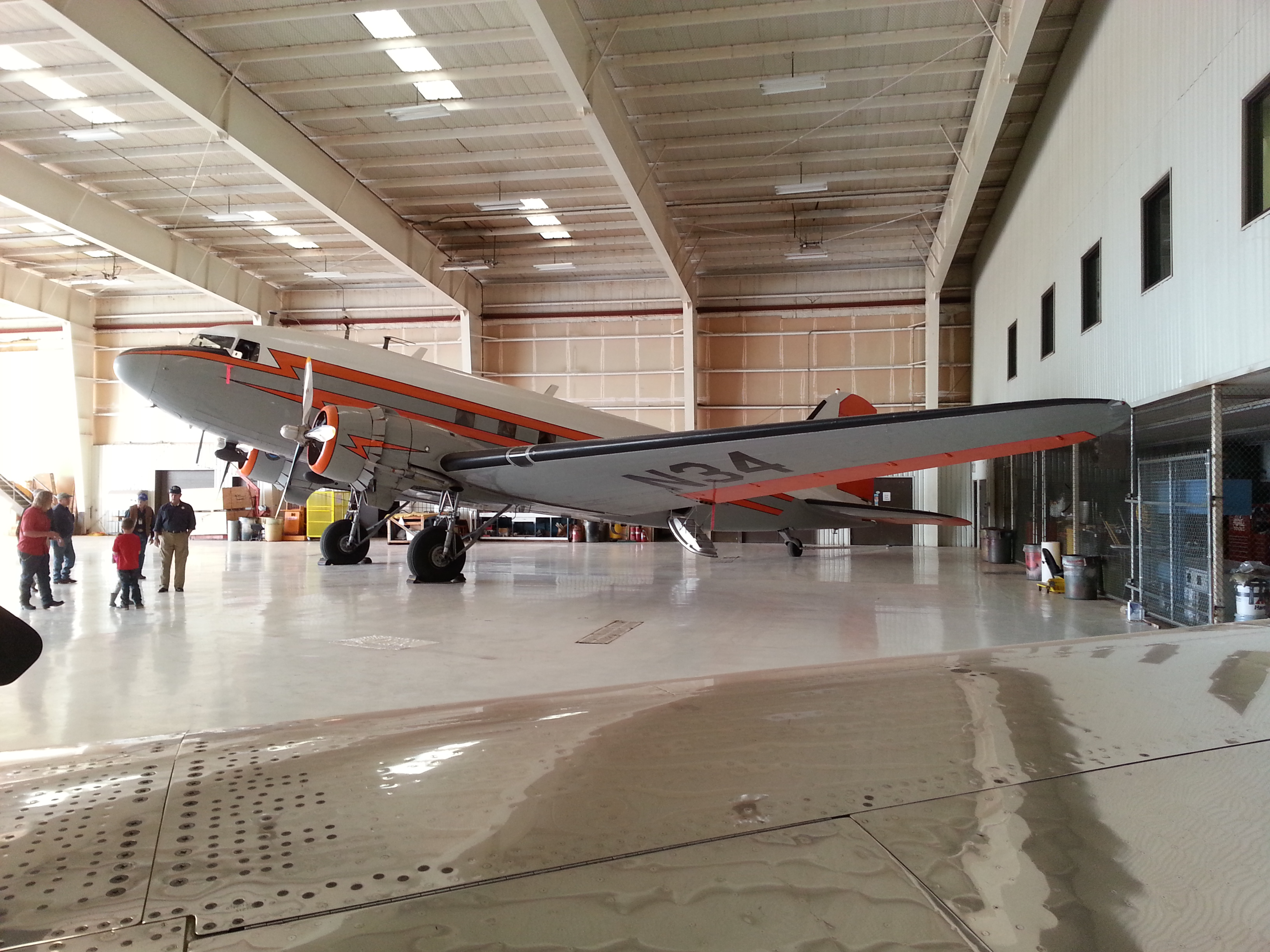
1945 Douglas DC-3 N34 US Navy R4D-6 1945-1956, CAA/FAA DC-3C-R 1958-present, lent to Texas Air & Space Museum February 13, 2014 when it was flown from Oklahoma City, Oklahoma, to Amarillo, Texas, listed on the nation's National Register of Historic Places

=== Outdoor aircraft park ===
- de Havilland Canada C-7A Caribou
- Grumman C-11A Shuttle Training Aircraft

=== Aircraft indoors ===
- Bell OH-13S Sioux 63-9085
- Douglas DC-3 N34
- Speed F4F Bearcat

=== Indoor exhibits ===
- Aviators of the past – covers local aviators who made aviation history throughout the area, state, nation, and world
- Airports of the past – describes neighboring airports that hosted airmen and aircraft of the early days of aviation
- Amarillo Army Airfield – documents the comings and goings of aircraft and aviators of the war years
- Harold English and English Field Airport – celebrates the dominant aviator and airfield of the area's early aviation
- Military Aviation – highlights aircraft and aviators of the war years while emphasizing service at nearby Amarillo Army Air Field later called Amarillo Air Force Base
- Model aircraft – displays models of civil and military aircraft: All models are hand made by World War II veteran, former B-17 tail gunner, and expert model creator, Jack Rude.

==== Space exploration ====
This section of the museum houses dedications to the space program and covers the period from the Mercury flights to the Space Shuttle.
