= Lipscomb County Courthouse =

- U.S. National Register of Historic Places
- Texas State Antiquities Landmark
- Recorded Texas Historic Landmark
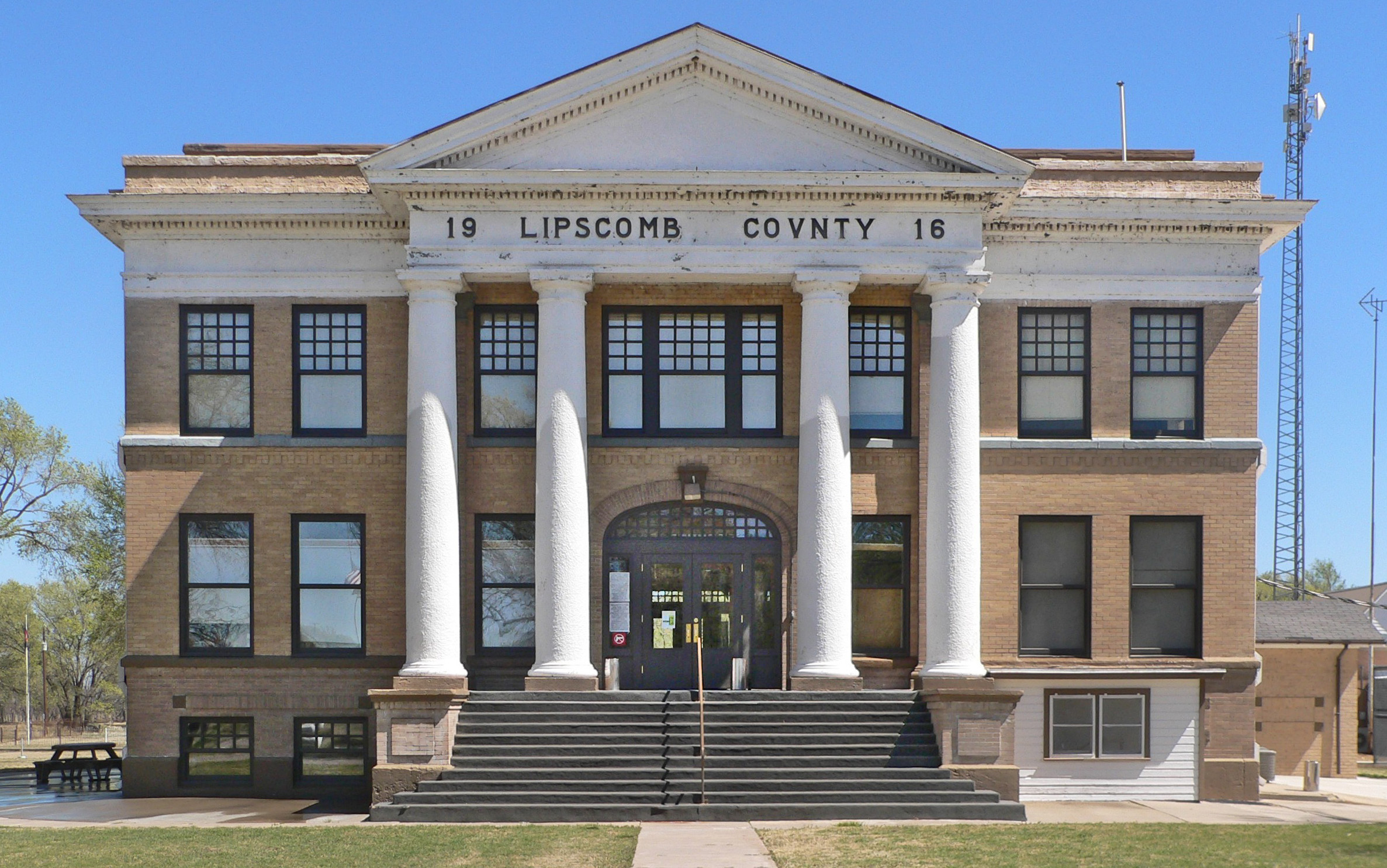
- Lipscomb County Courthouse in 2016

- Location within Texas Location within the United States
- Interactive map showing the location for Lipscomb County Courthouse
- Location: Courthouse Square, Lipscomb, Texas
- Coordinates: 36°14′2″N 100°16′14″W
- Area: less than one acre
- Built: 1916
- Architect and builder: William M. Rice
- Architectural style: Classical Revival
- NRHP reference No.: 08000730
- TSAL No.: 8200003130
- RTHL No.: 12483

Significant dates
- Added to NRHP: July 9, 2008
- Designated TSAL: January 1, 2008
- Designated RTHL: 2000

The Lipscomb County Courthouse, on Courthouse Square in Lipscomb, Texas, was built in 1916. It was listed on the National Register of Historic Places in 2008. It serves Lipscomb County, which was created/organized in 1886/1887. It is a Texas State Antiquities Landmark and a Recorded Texas Historic Landmark.

It was deemed notable as

the most prominent historic building in one of the least-populated counties in the state of Texas. The courthouse is the focal point of the unincorporated town of Lipscomb, with a population of less than 50, and it serves as both the governmental and social center for the county's residents. Classical Revival in style, the building epitomizes the period aesthetic applied to a small county courthouse. Designed by architect and general contractor W. M. Rice of Amarillo, this building of buff-colored brick is nominated to the National Register of Historic Places under Criterion A in the area of Government, and Criterion C in the area of Architecture, both at the local level of significance.

The listing includes a second contributing building.

== See also ==
- National Register of Historic Places listings in Lipscomb County, Texas
- Recorded Texas Historic Landmarks in Lipscomb County
- List of county courthouses in Texas
