= Childress Commercial and Civic Historic District =

Historic district in Texas, United States

- U.S. National Register of Historic Places
- U.S. Historic district
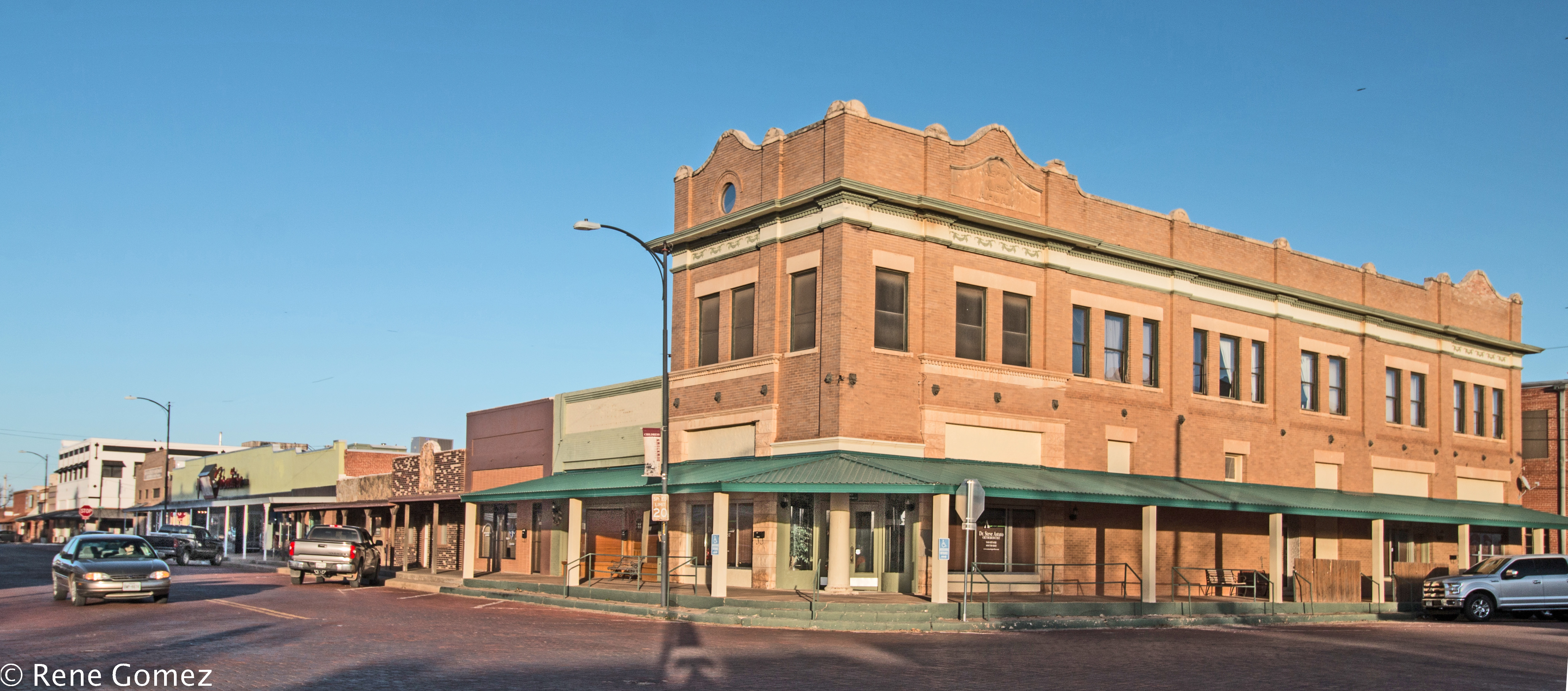
- Northeast corner of Commerce St. at Ave. B

- Location within Texas Location within the United States
- Location: Roughly bounded by 3rd St., NW., Aves. A & I, 2nd St., NE., Fair Park & 810 Ave. I NE., Childress, Texas
- Coordinates: 33°48′57″N 98°11′45″W
- Area: 109.8 acres (44.4 ha)
- Built: 1892
- Architect: Multiple
- Architectural style: Multiple
- NRHP reference No.: 16000349
- Added to NRHP: June 7, 2016

The Childress Commercial and Civic Historic District is a 110 acres (45 ha) historic district in Childress, Texas which was listed on the National Register of Historic Places in 2016. The district includes 93 contributing buildings, five contributing structures, three contributing sites, and two contributing objects, as well as 30 non-contributing buildings.

Over 60 acres are in the city's Fair Park, and it includes about 17 city blocks plus a discontiguous 1.3 acre parcel holding the former J.J. Rhoads School gymnasium and auditorium, a landmark in an historically African-American neighborhood.

The majority of its buildings are one-part or two-part commercial buildings, built of cast iron, brick, wood, stone and glass. It includes brick-paved streets installed in the 1920s in much of the commercial area.

Two properties within the district are Recorded Texas Historic Landmarks (RTHL). These and other significant buildings include:

- Childress Post Office Building (RTHL #830, 1991), 210 Third St. NW
- Palace Theater (RTHL #13801, 2005), 206 N. Main St.
- Former Childress High School, 700 Commerce St., now a junior high school
- J.J. Rhoads School Gymnasium, 810 Ave. I NE

== See also ==
- National Register of Historic Places listings in Childress County, Texas
- Recorded Texas Historic Landmarks in Childress County
