= National Register of Historic Places listings in the Southeast region of Texas =

This is a list of the National Register of Historic Places listings in Texas's Southeast region.

The Northwest region is an area of 15 counties defined by the Texas Comptroller for economic reporting in 2022, as mapped here.

The region included 2020 population of 769,000, or 2.6 percent of Texas' population, with the Beaumont-Port Arthur MSA having 52 percent of the Northwest region's population. About 33 percent is included in Jefferson County alone.

To see all locations together in a map, click on "Map all coordinates using OpenSourceMap" at right.

== Angelina County ==
	Name on the Register	Image	Date listed	Location	City or town	Description
1	Abercrombie-Cavanaugh House	Abercrombie-Cavanaugh House	December 22, 1988 (#88002794)	304 Paul Ave. 31°20′31″N 94°43′30″W	Lufkin	Historic Resources of Angelina County MRA
2	Angelina River Bridge		December 22, 1988 (#88002801)	US 59 over Angelina River; 31°27′25″N 94°43′34″W	Lufkin	Historic Resources of Angelina County MRA, bridge replaced 1998
3	Banks-Ogg House	Banks-Ogg House	December 22, 1988 (#88002771)	602 E Groesbeck St. 31°20′21″N 94°43′21″W	Lufkin	Historic Resources of Angelina County MRA
4	Behannon-Kenley House	Behannon-Kenley House	December 22, 1988 (#88002798)	317 Shepherd Ave. 31°20′15″N 94°43′34″W	Lufkin	Historic Resources of Angelina County MRA
5	Binion-Casper House	Binion-Casper House	July 19, 1989 (#88002785)	404 Mantooth Ave. 31°20′30″N 94°44′00″W	Lufkin	Historic Resources of Angelina County MRA
6	Bowers-Felts House	Bowers-Felts House	December 22, 1988 (#88002780)	1213 Lotus Ln. 31°20′27″N 94°44′42″W	Lufkin	Historic Resources of Angelina County MRA
7	Boynton-Kent House	Boynton-Kent House	December 22, 1988 (#88002779)	107 W Kerr St. 31°19′52″N 94°43′46″W	Lufkin	Historic Resources of Angelina County MRA
8	Houston Brookshire-Yeates House	Houston Brookshire-Yeates House	December 22, 1988 (#88002776)	304 E Howe St. 31°20′34″N 94°43′28″W	Lufkin	Historic Resources of Angelina County MRA
9	Byus-Kirkland House	Byus-Kirkland House	December 22, 1988 (#88002786)	411 Mantooth Ave. 31°20′27″N 94°44′00″W	Lufkin	Historic Resources of Angelina County MRA
10	Clark-Whitton House	Clark-Whitton House	December 22, 1988 (#88002792)	1865 Old Mill Rd. 31°21′30″N 94°44′57″W	Lufkin	Historic Resources of Angelina County MRA
11	Corstone Sales Company	Corstone Sales Company	December 22, 1988 (#88002797)	109-111 E Shepherd St. 31°20′17″N 94°43′43″W	Lufkin	Historic Resources of Angelina County MRA
12	Dunham Hill		December 22, 1988 (#88002803)	US 69 west of Huntington; 31°17′03″N 94°35′41″W	Huntington	Historic Resources of Angelina County MRA
13	Everitt-Cox House	Everitt-Cox House	December 22, 1988 (#88002789)	418 Moore Ave. 31°20′23″N 94°43′59″W	Lufkin	Historic Resources of Angelina County MRA
14	Fenley Commercial Building	Fenley Commercial Building	December 22, 1988 (#88002781)	112 E Lufkin Ave. 31°20′20″N 94°43′42″W	Lufkin	Historic Resources of Angelina County MRA
15	Gibbs-Flournoy House		December 22, 1988 (#88002804)	Farm to Market Road 844; 31°08′30″N 94°32′26″W	Manning	Recorded Texas Historic Landmark, Historic Resources of Angelina County MRA
16	S. W. Henderson-Bridges House		December 22, 1988 (#88002775)	202 Henderson St. 31°21′36″N 94°45′05″W	Lufkin	Historic Resources of Angelina County MRA
17	Humason-Pinkerton House	Humason-Pinkerton House	December 22, 1988 (#88002773)	602 Grove Ave. 31°20′33″N 94°44′01″W	Lufkin	Historic Resources of Angelina County MRA
18	Keltys Worker Housing	Keltys Worker Housing	December 22, 1988 (#88002784)	109 Maas; 31°21′38″N 94°45′10″W	Lufkin	Historic Resources of Angelina County MRA
19	A. C. Kennedy-Runnells House	A. C. Kennedy-Runnells House	December 22, 1988 (#88002772)	603 E Groesbeck St. 31°20′23″N 94°43′20″W	Lufkin	Historic Resources of Angelina County MRA
20	R. A. Kennedy-J. M. Lowrey House	R. A. Kennedy-J. M. Lowrey House	December 22, 1988 (#88002770)	519 E Groesbeck St. 31°20′23″N 94°43′22″W	Lufkin	Historic Resources of Angelina County MRA
21	J. H. Kurth House	J. H. Kurth House	December 22, 1988 (#88002791)	1860 Old Mill Rd. 31°21′30″N 94°44′53″W	Lufkin	Recorded Texas Historic Landmark, Historic Resources of Angelina County MRA
22	Kurth-Glover House	Kurth-Glover House	December 22, 1988 (#88002790)	1847 Old Mill Rd. 31°21′26″N 94°44′55″W	Lufkin	Historic Resources of Angelina County MRA
23	G. E. Lawrence House	G. E. Lawrence House	December 22, 1988 (#88002766)	2005 S Chestnut St. 31°18′48″N 94°42′30″W	Lufkin	Historic Resources of Angelina County MRA
24	Lufkin Land-Long Bell-Buck House	Lufkin Land-Long Bell-Buck House	December 22, 1988 (#88002783)	1218 Lufkin St. 31°20′10″N 94°42′59″W	Lufkin	Historic Resources of Angelina County MRA
25	Marsh-Smith House	Marsh-Smith House	December 22, 1988 (#88002796)	503 N Raguet St. 31°20′30″N 94°44′08″W	Lufkin	Recorded Texas Historic Landmark, Historic Resources of Angelina County MRA
26	McClendon-Abney Hardware Company	McClendon-Abney Hardware Company	December 22, 1988 (#88002782)	119 E Lufkin Ave. 31°20′20″N 94°43′41″W	Lufkin	Historic Resources of Angelina County MRA
27	McGilbert House		December 22, 1988 (#88002793)	1902 Old Mill Rd. 31°21′30″N 94°44′53″W	Lufkin	Historic Resources of Angelina County MRA
28	Newsom-Moss House	Newsom-Moss House	December 22, 1988 (#88002787)	420 Mantooth Ave. 31°20′29″N 94°44′02″W	Lufkin	Historic Resources of Angelina County MRA
29	Old Federal Building-Federal Courthouse	Old Federal Building-Federal Courthouse	December 22, 1988 (#88002799)	104 N Third St. 31°20′19″N 94°43′34″W	Lufkin	Historic Resources of Angelina County MRA
30	Parker-Bradshaw House	Parker-Bradshaw House	December 22, 1988 (#88002795)	213 N Raguet St. 31°20′22″N 94°44′05″W	Lufkin	Historic Resources of Angelina County MRA
31	Dr. Edward Percy-Abney House	Dr. Edward Percy-Abney House	December 22, 1988 (#88002778)	466 Jefferson Ave. 31°20′06″N 94°44′09″W	Lufkin	Historic Resources of Angelina County MRA
32	A. F. Perry and Myrtle-Pitmann House	A. F. Perry and Myrtle-Pitmann House	December 22, 1988 (#88002765)	402 S Bynum St. 31°20′01″N 94°44′16″W	Lufkin	Historic Resources of Angelina County MRA
33	C. W. Perry Archie-Hallmark House	C. W. Perry Archie-Hallmark House	December 22, 1988 (#88002764)	302 S. Bynum; 31°20′04″N 94°44′18″W	Lufkin	Historic Resources of Angelina County MRA
34	Pines Theatre	Pines Theatre	December 22, 1988 (#88002767)	113 S First St. 31°20′18″N 94°43′44″W	Lufkin	Historic Resources of Angelina County MRA
35	Rastus-Read House		December 22, 1988 (#88002768)	1509 S First St. 31°19′12″N 94°43′38″W	Lufkin	Historic Resources of Angelina County MRA, demolished
36	Russell-Arnold House		December 22, 1988 (#88002788)	121 W Menefee St. 31°19′38″N 94°43′43″W	Lufkin	Historic Resources of Angelina County MRA, demolished
37	Standley House		December 22, 1988 (#88002800)	1607 Tulane Dr. 31°19′01″N 94°43′23″W	Lufkin	Historic Resources of Angelina County MRA, demolished
38	Henry G. Temple House		December 22, 1988 (#88002802)	501 Hines Rd. 31°10′40″N 94°47′16″W	Diboll	Historic Resources of Angelina County MRA
39	Texas Highway Department Complex	Texas Highway Department Complex	December 22, 1988 (#88002769)	110 Forest Park; 31°21′26″N 94°43′02″W	Lufkin	Historic Resources of Angelina County MRA
40	Walter C. Trout-White House	Walter C. Trout-White House	December 22, 1988 (#88002777)	444 Jefferson Ave. 31°20′08″N 94°44′04″W	Lufkin	Historic Resources of Angelina County MRA
41	Howard Walker House		December 22, 1988 (#88002774)	503 Harmony Hill Rd. 31°18′32″N 94°43′13″W	Lufkin	Historic Resources of Angelina County MRA

== Hardin County ==
	Name on the Register	Image	Date listed	Location	City or town	Description
1	Ada Belle Oil Well		January 20, 1980 (#80004126)	N of Batson; 30°15′49″N 94°36′57″W	Batson	
2	Kirby-Hill House	Kirby-Hill House	May 20, 1999 (#99000610)	210 Main St. 30°22′12″N 94°18′55″W	Kountze	Recorded Texas Historic Landmark

== Houston County ==
	Name on the Register	Image	Date listed	Location	City or town	Description
1	Downes-Aldrich House	Downes-Aldrich House	April 19, 1978 (#78002957)	206 N. 7th St. 31°19′10″N 95°27′16″W	Crockett	Recorded Texas Historic Landmark
2	First United Methodist Church	First United Methodist Church	March 21, 2011 (#11000133)	701 E Goliad Ave; 31°19′03″N 95°27′17″W	Crockett	
3	Houston County Courthouse	Houston County Courthouse	May 10, 2010 (#10000248)	401 E Houston Ave. 31°19′05″N 95°27′27″W	Crockett	State Antiquities Landmark, Recorded Texas Historic Landmark
4	Mary Allen Seminary for Colored Girls, Administration Building	Mary Allen Seminary for Colored Girls, Administration Building	May 12, 1983 (#83004514)	803 N. 4th St. 31°19′38″N 95°27′41″W	Crockett	
5	Monroe-Crook House	Monroe-Crook House	March 31, 1971 (#71000940)	707 E. Houston St. 31°19′08″N 95°27′15″W	Crockett	Recorded Texas Historic Landmark
6	Swale at Mission Tejas State Park		May 30, 2019 (#100003971)	Address Restricted	Grapeland vicinity	
7	Westerman Mound	Westerman Mound	June 21, 1971 (#71000941)	Address restricted	Kennard	

== Jasper County ==
	Name on the Register	Image	Date listed	Location	City or town	Description
1	Aldridge Sawmill	Aldridge Sawmill	March 2, 2001 (#01000209)	Angelina National Forest., S end of Forest System Rd. 31°02′19″N 94°16′49″W	Zavalla	Early Logging Industry in East Texas MPS
2	Blake-Beaty-Orton House	Blake-Beaty-Orton House	April 16, 1975 (#75001994)	206 S. Main St. 30°55′08″N 93°59′58″W	Jasper	State Antiquities Landmark, Recorded Texas Historic Landmark
3	Col. Randolph C. Doom House		December 30, 1975 (#75001995)	7.5 mi (12.1 km). W of Jasper on FM 1747; 30°55′25″N 94°07′27″W	Jasper	Recorded Texas Historic Landmark
4	Jasper County Courthouse	Jasper County Courthouse	September 6, 1984 (#84001898)	Public Sq. 30°55′16″N 94°00′00″W	Jasper	State Antiquities Landmark
5	Andrew Smyth House	Andrew Smyth House	May 25, 1979 (#79002983)	W of Jasper; 30°56′07″N 94°08′39″W	Jasper	Recorded Texas Historic Landmark
6	Turner-White-McGee House		June 19, 1979 (#79002984)	Off U.S. 96; 30°48′17″N 93°54′51″W	Roganville	Recorded Texas Historic Landmark
7	US 190 Bridge at the Neches River	US 190 Bridge at the Neches River	October 10, 1996 (#96001121)	US 190 at the Jasper and Tyler County line 30°51′09″N 94°10′52″W	Jasper	Historic Bridges of Texas, 1866-1945 MPS, extends into Tyler County

== Jefferson County ==
	Name on the Register	Image	Date listed	Location	City or town	Description
1	Beaumont Commercial District	Beaumont Commercial District	April 14, 1978 (#78002959); March 4, 2008 boundary increase (#07000892)	Roughly bounded by Orleans, Bowie, Neches, Crockett, Laurel, Willow, Broadway, Pearl, Main, and Gilbert Sts. 30°04′55″N 94°05′56″W	Beaumont	Includes Recorded Texas Historic Landmarks
2	Beaumont Y.M.C.A.	Beaumont Y.M.C.A.	March 30, 1979 (#79002985)	934 Calder St. 30°05′09″N 94°07′36″W	Beaumont	
3	Holmes Duke House	Holmes Duke House	October 4, 1984 (#84000028)	694 Forrest St. 30°05′15″N 94°06′18″W	Beaumont	Recorded Texas Historic Landmark
4	Eddingston Court	Eddingston Court	October 22, 2004 (#04001175)	3300 Proctor St; 29°53′44″N 93°54′44″W	Port Arthur	Sculpture by Dionicio Rodriguez in Texas MPS
5	First National Bank of Port Arthur		November 24, 2015 (#15000837)	501 Proctor St; 29°52′19″N 93°56′06″W	Port Arthur	Now houses the Port Arthur Chamber of Commerce
6	French Home Trading Post	French Home Trading Post	October 15, 1970 (#70000752)	2995 French Rd. 30°06′36″N 94°08′35″W	Beaumont	Recorded Texas Historic Landmark
7	Gates Memorial Library	Gates Memorial Library	May 4, 1981 (#81000632)	317 Stilwell Blvd. 29°52′42″N 93°55′38″W	Port Arthur	Recorded Texas Historic Landmark
8	Hinchee House	Hinchee House	November 21, 1978 (#78002960)	1814 Park St. 30°04′12″N 94°05′38″W	Beaumont	Recorded Texas Historic Landmark
9	Idle Hours	Idle Hours	May 22, 1978 (#78002961)	1608 Orange St. 30°04′07″N 94°05′57″W	Beaumont	
10	Jefferson County Courthouse	Jefferson County Courthouse	June 17, 1982 (#82004509)	1149 Pearl St. 30°04′44″N 94°05′36″W	Beaumont	State Antiquities Landmark
11	Jefferson Theatre	Jefferson Theatre	January 30, 1978 (#78002962)	345 Fannin St. 30°04′54″N 94°05′52″W	Beaumont	Recorded Texas Historic Landmark, part of Beaumont Commercial District
12	Lamar State College of Technology Administration Building	Lamar State College of Technology Administration Building	November 27, 2015 (#15000838)	1026 Mirabeau St. 30°02′34″N 94°04′21″W	Beaumont	
13	Lucas Gusher, Spindletop Oil Field	Lucas Gusher, Spindletop Oil Field	November 13, 1966 (#66000818)	3 mi (4.8 km). S of Beaumont on Spindletop Ave. 30°01′12″N 94°04′31″W	Beaumont	
14	Marconi Tower at Port Arthur College	Marconi Tower at Port Arthur College	August 5, 2008 (#08000756)	1500 Procter St. 29°52′46″N 93°55′35″W	Port Arthur	
15	McFaddin House Complex	McFaddin House Complex	January 25, 1971 (#71000942)	1906 McFaddin St. 30°05′14″N 94°06′56″W	Beaumont	Recorded Texas Historic Landmark
16	Mildred Buildings	Mildred Buildings	December 1, 1978 (#78002963)	1400 block of Calder Ave. 30°05′08″N 94°06′36″W	Beaumont	Recorded Texas Historic Landmark
17	Pompeiian Villa	Pompeiian Villa	May 23, 1973 (#73001967)	1953 Lakeshore Dr. 29°52′59″N 93°55′22″W	Port Arthur	Recorded Texas Historic Landmark
18	Port Arthur Downtown Historic District		January 14, 2021 (#100006046)	Roughly bounded by West Reverend Doctor Ransom Howard St., Fort Worth Ave., Lakeshore Dr., and Waco St. 29°52′20″N 93°56′09″W	Port Arthur	
19	Port Arthur Federated Women's Clubhouse	Port Arthur Federated Women's Clubhouse	July 18, 1985 (#85001559)	1924 Lakeshore Dr. 29°52′54″N 93°55′22″W	Port Arthur	Recorded Texas Historic Landmark
20	Port Arthur-Orange Bridge	Port Arthur-Orange Bridge	October 10, 1996 (#96001127)	TX 87 at the Jefferson and Orange Cnty. line 29°58′47″N 93°52′18″W	Groves	Historic Bridges of Texas, 1866-1945 MPS; extends into Orange County
21	Rose Hill	Rose Hill	October 31, 1979 (#79002986)	100 Woodworth Blvd. 29°53′24″N 93°54′54″W	Port Arthur	State Antiquities Landmark, Recorded Texas Historic Landmark
22	Sanders House	Sanders House	December 13, 1978 (#78002964)	479 Pine; 30°05′10″N 94°05′53″W	Beaumont	Recorded Texas Historic Landmark
23	US Post Office and Federal Building	US Post Office and Federal Building	May 12, 1986 (#86001099)	500 Austin Ave. 29°52′22″N 93°56′07″W	Port Arthur	
24	Woman's Club of Beaumont Clubhouse	Woman's Club of Beaumont Clubhouse	August 16, 1994 (#94000983)	575 Magnolia Ave. 30°05′11″N 94°06′15″W	Beaumont	

== Nacogdoches County ==
	Name on the Register	Image	Date listed	Location	City or town	Description
1	Tol Barret House	Tol Barret House	July 27, 1979 (#79002998)	S of Nacogdoches; 31°32′09″N 94°40′01″W	Nacogdoches	Recorded Texas Historic Landmark
2	Eugene H. Blount House	Eugene H. Blount House	February 14, 1992 (#92000014)	1801 North St. 31°37′07″N 94°39′11″W	Nacogdoches	Historic and Architectural Resources of Nacogdoches MPS
3	Stephen William and Mary Price Blount House	Stephen William and Mary Price Blount House	January 30, 1991 (#90002180)	310 N. Mound St. 31°36′19″N 94°39′02″W	Nacogdoches	Part of Washington Square Historic District
4	Maria A. Davidson Apartments	Maria A. Davidson Apartments	February 14, 1992 (#92000009)	214 S. Fredonia St. 31°36′06″N 94°39′18″W	Nacogdoches	Part of Nacogdoches Downtown Historic District; Historic and Architectural Resources of Nacogdoches MPS
5	Bernardo D'Ortolan Rancho Site	Bernardo D'Ortolan Rancho Site	November 26, 2014 (#14000101)	Address restricted	Nacogdoches	Historic Resources of El Camino Real de los Tejas National Historic Trail MPS
6	Raphael D'Ortolan Site	Raphael D'Ortolan Site	November 26, 2014 (#14000100)	Address restricted	Nacogdoches	Historic Resources of El Camino Real de los Tejas National Historic Trail MPS
7	Durst-Taylor House	Durst-Taylor House	August 21, 2003 (#03000808)	304 North St. 31°36′19″N 94°39′16″W	Nacogdoches	Recorded Texas Historic Landmark; part of Nacogdoches Downtown Historic District
8	Hayter Office Building	Hayter Office Building	February 14, 1992 (#92000010)	112 E. Main St. 31°36′11″N 94°39′19″W	Nacogdoches	Part of Nacogdoches Downtown Historic District; Historic and Architectural Resources of Nacogdoches MPS
9	Hoya Land Office Building	Hoya Land Office Building	February 14, 1992 (#92000015)	120 E. Pilar St. 31°36′08″N 94°39′21″W	Nacogdoches	Recorded Texas Historic Landmark; part of Nacogdoches Downtown Historic District; Historic and Architectural Resources of Nacogdoches MPS
10	Roland Jones House	Roland Jones House	February 14, 1992 (#92000007)	141 N. Church St. 31°36′13″N 94°39′10″W	Nacogdoches	Recorded Texas Historic Landmark; part of Nacogdoches Downtown Historic District; Historic and Architectural Resources of Nacogdoches MPS
11	Mangham-McIlwain Building		March 22, 2019 (#100003538)	10001 Appleby Sand Rd. 31°42′58″N 94°36′18″W	Nacogdoches	
12	Nacogdoches Downtown Historic District	Nacogdoches Downtown Historic District	May 29, 2008 (#08000478)	Roughly bounded by Southern Pacific RR tracks, Banita Cr., Pilar, Mound, Arnold, North & Hospital Sts., 31°36′18″N 94°39′20″W	Nacogdoches	Includes Recorded Texas Historic Landmarks
13	Oil Springs Oil Field Discovery Well		November 23, 1977 (#77001461)	4 mi (6.4 km). SE of Woden; 31°28′20″N 94°28′03″W	Woden	
14	Old Cotton Exchange Building	Old Cotton Exchange Building	February 14, 1992 (#92000008)	305 E. Commerce St. 31°36′12″N 94°39′13″W	Nacogdoches	Part of Nacogdoches Downtown Historic District; Historic and Architectural Resources of Nacogdoches MPS
15	Old Nacogdoches University Building	Old Nacogdoches University Building	June 21, 1971 (#71000956)	Washington Sq. 31°36′24″N 94°39′05″W	Nacogdoches	State Antiquities Landmark, Recorded Texas Historic Landmark; part of Washington Square Historic District
16	Old Post Office Building	Old Post Office Building	February 14, 1992 (#92000011)	206 E. Main St. 31°36′10″N 94°39′18″W	Nacogdoches	Recorded Texas Historic Landmark; part of Nacogdoches Downtown Historic District; Historic and Architectural Resources of Nacogdoches MPS
17	Roberts Building	Roberts Building	February 14, 1992 (#92000016)	216 E. Pilar St. 31°36′07″N 94°39′17″W	Nacogdoches	Part of Nacogdoches Downtown Historic District; Historic and Architectural Resources of Nacogdoches MPS
18	Southern Pacific Railroad Depot	Southern Pacific Railroad Depot	February 14, 1992 (#92000013)	500 W. Main St. 31°36′18″N 94°39′32″W	Nacogdoches	Part of Nacogdoches Downtown Historic District; Historic and Architectural Resources of Nacogdoches MPS
19	Adolphus Sterne House	Adolphus Sterne House	November 13, 1976 (#76002053)	211 S. Lanana St. 31°36′00″N 94°39′02″W	Nacogdoches	State Antiquities Landmark, Recorded Texas Historic Landmark; part of Sterne-Hoya Historic District
20	Sterne-Hoya Historic District	Sterne-Hoya Historic District	February 14, 1992 (#92000017)	100-200 blocks of S. Lanana St., 500 block of E. Main St. (S side), 500 block of E. Pilar St. 31°36′02″N 94°39′04″W	Nacogdoches	Includes State Antiquities Landmark, Recorded Texas Historic Landmark; Historic and Architectural Resources of Nacogdoches MPS
21	Virginia Avenue Historic District	Virginia Avenue Historic District	February 14, 1992 (#92000018)	500 block of Bremond (W side), 500-1800 blocks of Virginia Ave., 521 Weaver; 31°35′58″N 94°39′38″W	Nacogdoches	Includes Recorded Texas Historic Landmark; Historic and Architectural Resources of Nacogdoches MPS
22	Washington Square Historic District	Washington Square Historic District	February 14, 1992 (#92000019)	Roughly bounded by Houston, Logansport, N. Lanana, E. Hospital and N. Fredonia Sts. 31°36′26″N 94°38′59″W	Nacogdoches	Includes State Antiquities Landmark, Recorded Texas Historic Landmark; Historic and Architectural Resources of Nacogdoches MPS
23	Woodmen of the World Building	Woodmen of the World Building	February 14, 1992 (#92000012)	412 E. Main St. 31°36′08″N 94°39′13″W	Nacogdoches	Part of Nacogdoches Downtown Historic District; Historic and Architectural Resources of Nacogdoches MPS
24	Zion Hill Historic District	Zion Hill Historic District	January 7, 1993 (#92001759)	Roughly bounded by Park St., Lanana Cr., Oak Grove Cemetery and N. Lanana St. 31°36′20″N 94°38′50″W	Nacogdoches	Includes Recorded Texas Historic Landmark; Historic and Architectural Resources of Nacogdoches MPS

== Newton County ==
	Name on the Register	Image	Date listed	Location	City or town	Description
1	Autrey-Williams House	Autrey-Williams House	January 29, 2013 (#12001251)	717 North St. 30°51′10″N 93°45′13″W	Newton	Recorded Texas Historic Landmark
2	Burr's Ferry Bridge	Burr's Ferry Bridge	May 18, 1998 (#98000562)	TX 63 & LA 8 at Sabine River; 31°03′50″N 93°31′13″W	Burkeville	Extends into Vernon Parish, Louisiana
3	Deweyville Swing Bridge	Deweyville Swing Bridge	June 8, 2011 (#11000346)	TX 12 & LA 12 at Sabine River; 30°18′13″N 93°44′37″W	Deweyville	Historic Bridges of Texas, 1866-1945 MPS, extends into Calcasieu Parish, Louisiana
4	Newton County Courthouse	Newton County Courthouse	July 19, 1979 (#79002999)	Off U.S. Route 190; 30°50′52″N 93°45′37″W	Newton	State Antiquities Landmark, Recorded Texas Historic Landmark
5	Addie L. and A.T. Odom Homestead	Addie L. and A.T. Odom Homestead	April 10, 2012 (#12000197)	194 County Road 1040; 30°58′11″N 93°42′23″W	Burkeville	
6	West Log House		December 13, 1979 (#79003000)	Northeast of Salem; 30°33′12″N 93°45′08″W	Salem	

== Orange County ==
	Name on the Register	Image	Date listed	Location	City or town	Description
1	Cow Bayou Swing Bridge	Cow Bayou Swing Bridge	May 10, 2010 (#10000252)	SH 73/87 1.13 mi NE of jct with FM 1442; 30°02′42″N 93°49′15″W	Bridge City	Recorded Texas Historic Landmark; Historic Bridges of Texas, 1866-1945 MPS
2	Joseph and Annie Lucas House	Joseph and Annie Lucas House	October 17, 1997 (#97001233)	812 W. Pine St. 30°05′43″N 93°44′24″W	Orange	Recorded Texas Historic Landmark
3	Lutcher Memorial Church Building	Lutcher Memorial Church Building	September 9, 1982 (#82004517)	902 W. Green Ave. 30°05′36″N 93°44′16″W	Orange	Recorded Texas Historic Landmark
4	Navy Park Historic District		December 22, 1999 (#99001600)	Roughly bounded by W. Dewey Ave., Farragut St., Cooper's Gully Tract and 6th Ave. 30°06′27″N 93°43′54″W	Orange	
5	Port Arthur-Orange Bridge	Port Arthur-Orange Bridge	October 10, 1996 (#96001127)	TX 87 at the Jefferson and Orange County line 29°58′47″N 93°52′18″W	Groves	Historic Bridges of Texas, 1866-1945 MPS; extends into Jefferson County
6	Sims House	Sims House	March 26, 1980 (#80004143)	905 Division St. 30°05′22″N 93°44′18″W	Orange	Recorded Texas Historic Landmark
7	W. H. Stark House	W. H. Stark House	December 12, 1976 (#76002056)	611 W. Green Ave. 30°05′34″N 93°44′07″W	Orange	Recorded Texas Historic Landmark

== Polk County ==
	Name on the Register	Image	Date listed	Location	City or town	Description
1	William Keenan and Nancy Elizabeth McCardell House	William Keenan and Nancy Elizabeth McCardell House	August 10, 2005 (#05000863)	705 N. Beatty; 30°42′49″N 94°56′24″W	Livingston	
2	Polk County Courthouse and 1905 Courthouse Annex	Polk County Courthouse and 1905 Courthouse Annex	February 2, 2001 (#01000060)	Washington at Church St. 30°42′38″N 94°56′01″W	Livingston	Includes State Antiquities Landmarks, Recorded Texas Historic Landmark

== Sabine County ==
	Name on the Register	Image	Date listed	Location	City or town	Description
1	Lobanillo Swales	Lobanillo Swales	November 24, 2015 (#15000839)	Address restricted	Geneva vicinity	
2	Oliphint House	Oliphint House	August 18, 1977 (#77001473)	7 mi (11 km). E of Milam off TX 21; 31°28′04″N 93°45′23″W	Milam	

== San Augustine County ==
	Name on the Register	Image	Date listed	Location	City or town	Description
1	Capt. Thomas William Blount House	Capt. Thomas William Blount House	March 7, 1973 (#73001974)	2.5 mi (4.0 km). W of San Augustine on TX 21; 31°31′56″N 94°10′03″W	San Augustine	Recorded Texas Historic Landmark
2	Matthew Cartwright House	Matthew Cartwright House	January 25, 1971 (#71000959)	912 E. Main St. 31°31′44″N 94°06′19″W	San Augustine	Recorded Texas Historic Landmark, part of San Augustine Residential Historic District
3	Ezekiel Cullen House	Ezekiel Cullen House	June 21, 1971 (#71000960)	207 S. Congress St. 31°31′35″N 94°06′28″W	San Augustine	Recorded Texas Historic Landmark, part of San Augustine Residential Historic District
4	William Garrett Plantation House	William Garrett Plantation House	March 25, 1977 (#77001474)	1 mi (1.6 km). W of San Augustine on TX 21; 31°32′07″N 94°08′23″W	San Augustine	Recorded Texas Historic Landmark
5	Horn-Polk House	Horn-Polk House	November 7, 1976 (#76002064)	717 W. Columbia St. 31°31′54″N 94°07′13″W	San Augustine	Recorded Texas Historic Landmark
6	Mission Nuestra Senora de los Dolores de los Ais Site	Mission Nuestra Senora de los Dolores de los Ais Site	December 16, 1977 (#77001475)	701 S. Broadway; 31°31′26″N 94°06′48″W	San Augustine	Part of a State Historic Site
7	San Augustine Commercial Historic District	San Augustine Commercial Historic District	April 3, 2007 (#07000269)	Roughly bounded by Main St., Montgomery St., Congress St., Broadway, Columbia St., property lines and Golden Way; 31°31′49″N 94°06′38″W	San Augustine	Includes State Antiquities Landmark, Recorded Texas Historic Landmarks
8	San Augustine County Courthouse and Jail	San Augustine County Courthouse and Jail	August 20, 2004 (#04000892)	Courthouse Sq. 31°31′48″N 94°06′40″W	San Augustine	State Antiquities Landmark, includes Recorded Texas Historic Landmarks, part of San Augustine Commercial Historic District
9	San Augustine Residential Historic District	San Augustine Residential Historic District	October 16, 2006 (#06000508)	Roughly surrounding TX 147, Texas 3230 and TX 2213; 31°31′38″N 94°06′29″W	San Augustine	Includes Recorded Texas Historic Landmarks

== San Jacinto County ==
	Name on the Register	Image	Date listed	Location	City or town	Description
1	San Jacinto County Courthouse	San Jacinto County Courthouse	May 1, 2003 (#03000332)	#1 TX 150 at Byrd Ave. 30°35′32″N 95°07′42″W	Coldspring	Recorded Texas Historic Landmark
2	San Jacinto County Jail	San Jacinto County Jail	July 15, 1980 (#80004148)	Slade and Loyd St. 30°35′46″N 95°07′42″W	Coldspring	Recorded Texas Historic Landmark

== Shelby County ==
	Name on the Register	Image	Date listed	Location	City or town	Description
1	Shelby County Courthouse Square	Shelby County Courthouse Square	March 31, 1971 (#71001074); November 29, 1990 boundary increase (#90001819)	Courthouse Sq. 31°47′41″N 94°10′53″W	Center	State Antiquities Landmark, Recorded Texas Historic Landmark

== Trinity County ==
	Name on the Register	Image	Date listed	Location	City or town	Description
1	Old Red Schoolhouse	Old Red Schoolhouse	August 10, 2005 (#05000865)	100 W. San Jacinto; 30°56′34″N 95°22′31″W	Trinity	Recorded Texas Historic Landmark
2	Riverside Swinging Bridge	Riverside Swinging Bridge	September 12, 1979 (#79003020)	NE of Riverside; 30°51′26″N 95°23′46″W	Riverside	Extends into Walker County
3	State Highway 19 Bridge at Trinity River	State Highway 19 Bridge at Trinity River	December 1, 2004 (#04001290)	TX 19, on the Trinity/Walker county line 30°51′35″N 95°23′55″W	Riverside	Historic Bridges of Texas, 1866-1945 MPS, extends into Walker County
4	Trinity County Courthouse Square	Trinity County Courthouse Square	September 10, 2004 (#04000946)	162 W. First St., US 287 at TX 94; 31°03′21″N 95°07′33″W	Groveton	State Antiquities Landmark, Recorded Texas Historic Landmark

== Tyler County ==
	Name on the Register	Image	Date listed	Location	City or town	Description
1	Tyler County Courthouse	Tyler County Courthouse	May 18, 2015 (#15000247)	100 West Bluff Street; 30°46′30″N 94°24′56″W	Woodville	Recorded Texas Historic Landmark
2	US 190 Bridge at the Neches River	US 190 Bridge at the Neches River	October 10, 1996 (#96001121)	US 190 at the Jasper and Tyler County line 30°51′12″N 94°11′55″W	Jasper	Historic Bridges of Texas, 1866-1945 MPS, extends into Jasper County
3	Warren School	Warren School	September 12, 2008 (#08000883)	312 County Road 1515; 30°36′46″N 94°24′27″W	Warren	
