= Woodmen of the World Building =

Woodmen of the World Building may refer to:

- Woodmen of the World Building (Omaha, Nebraska), the tallest building between Chicago and the West Coast when built in 1912
- Woodmen of the World Building (Nacogdoches, Texas), a two-part commercial block building

== See also ==
- List of Woodmen of the World buildings
