= List of Woodmen of the World buildings =

This is a list of notable buildings associated with the Woodmen of the World (WOW).

The organization formerly owned a 19-story tower at 14th and Farnam Streets which was the tallest building between Chicago and the West coast at the time of its dedication in 1912. WOW built its current 30-story Woodmen Tower in 1969. It was Omaha's tallest building until the completion of the 45-story First National Bank Tower in 2002. The original WOW building was demolished in 1977. Also there are many buildings in which Woodmen of the World chapters met, and some of these are notable buildings.

in the United States (ordered by state then city)

	Building	Image	Dates	Location	City, State	Description
1	Woodmen Hall (Stuart, Florida)		1913-1914 built	217 SW Akron Ave., corner of SW 3rd St.	Stuart, Florida	
2	Woodmen of the World Building (Omaha, Nebraska)		1912 built	1323 Farnam Street; 41°15′28″N 95°56′03″W	Omaha, Nebraska	Tallest building between Chicago and the West Coast when built in 1912; demolished in 1977.
3	Woodmen Tower		1969 built	1700 Farnam Street	Omaha, Nebraska	30 story building that is headquarters of the Woodmen of the World insurance company
4	Paxton Hotel		1882 and 1927-1928 built	1403 Farnam St.	Omaha, Nebraska	Hotel where the Woodmen of the World was founded in 1890
5	W.O.W. Hall		1932 built 1996 NRHP-listed	291 W. 8th Ave. 44°3′4.24″N 123°5′49.59″W	Eugene, Oregon	Modern Movement, Art Deco architecture Also known as Woodmen of the World Hall and listed on the NRHP as the latter
6	Woodmen Hall (Saint Onge, South Dakota)		1991 NRHP-listed	Jct. of Center and Second Sts. 44°32′49″N 103°43′12″W		Early Commercial architecture
7	Woodmen of the World Building (Nacogdoches, Texas)		1923 built 1982 NRHP-listed		Nacogdoches, Texas	Two-part commercial block architecture, NRHP-listed
8	Woodmen of the World Lodge-Phoenix Camp No. 32		1915 built 1996 NRHP-listed; 2010 NRHP-delisted	110 Border St. 30°5′21″N 93°44′15″W	Orange, Texas	Mission/Spanish Revival architecture
	Druid Hall - Omaha Camp No. 24		1915 built	2412 Ames Ave. 41.299699°N 95.947226°W	North Omaha, Nebraska	Commercial vernacular

== See also ==
- Modern Woodmen Park, Davenport, Iowa, a baseball stadium named for Modern Woodmen of America
- Woodmen of Union Building, Hot Springs, Arkansas, NRHP-listed on Bathhouse Row
- Modern Woodmen of America Hall, a National Register of Historic Places listing in Brown County, South Dakota
- Melody Ballroom, Portland, Oregon, corporate headquarters of Woodmen of the World built in 1925.
