= Tyler City Hall =

- U.S. National Register of Historic Places
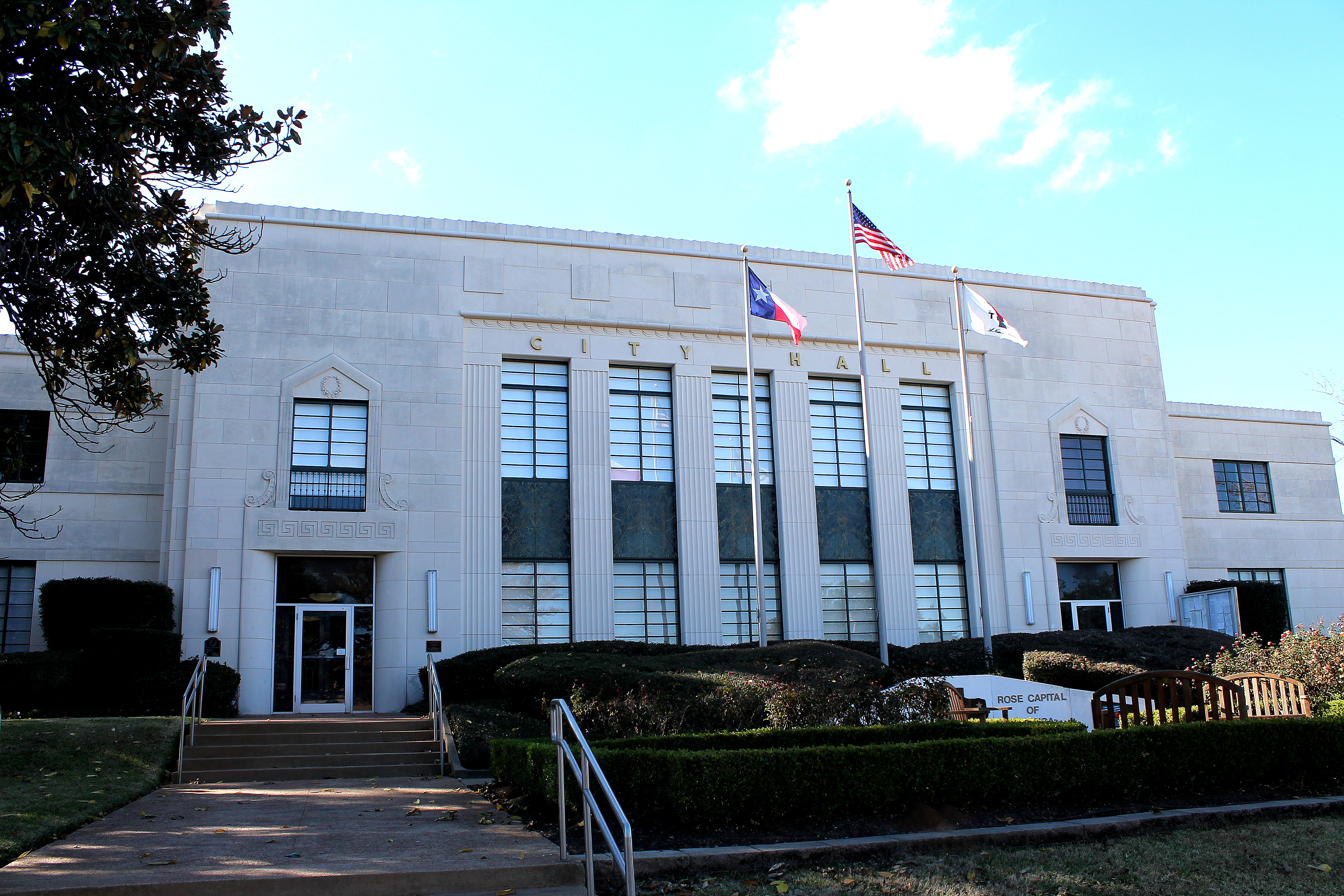
- City Hall in 2014

- Location within Texas Location within the United States
- Location: 212 N. Bonner Ave., Tyler, Texas
- Coordinates: 32°21′7″N 95°18′21″W
- Area: 1.3 acres (0.53 ha)
- Built: 1938
- Built by: A.M. Campbell & Co.
- Architect: Shirley Simons
- Architectural style: Classical Revival
- MPS: Tyler, Texas MPS
- NRHP reference No.: 07000129
- Added to NRHP: March 7, 2007

The Tyler City Hall at 212 N. Bonner Ave. in Tyler, Texas was built in 1938. It was designed by architect T. Shirley Simons, Sr. It was listed on the National Register of Historic Places in 2007. The listing included one contributing building and one contributing site on 1.3 acres (0.53 ha).

Construction of the building was financed by Depression-era PWA and/or WPA programs. Simons had been hired in 1936 by the City of Tyler "to provide architectural services for publics works projects." Other similar works by Simon were the Mother Frances Hospital and the new Tyler U.S. Post Office and Courthouse. It has been termed "a good local rendering of Art Deco styling".

== See also ==
- National Register of Historic Places listings in Smith County, Texas
