= National Register of Historic Places listings in San Augustine County, Texas =

Location of San Augustine County in Texas

This is a list of the National Register of Historic Places listings in San Augustine County, Texas.

This is intended to be a complete list of properties and districts listed on the National Register of Historic Places in San Augustine County, Texas. There are two districts and seven individual properties listed on the National Register in the county. One individually listed property is included within a State Historic Site while another is a State Antiquities Landmark. Five individually listed properties are Recorded Texas Historic Landmarks while an additional property and both districts contain several more.

This National Park Service list is complete through NPS recent listings posted May 1, 2026.

== Current listings ==
The publicly disclosed locations of National Register properties and districts may be seen in a mapping service provided.

	Name on the Register	Image	Date listed	Location	City or town	Description
1	Capt. Thomas William Blount House	Capt. Thomas William Blount House	March 7, 1973 (#73001974)	2.5 mi (4.0 km). W of San Augustine on TX 21; 31°31′56″N 94°10′03″W	San Augustine	Recorded Texas Historic Landmark
2	Matthew Cartwright House	Matthew Cartwright House	January 25, 1971 (#71000959)	912 E. Main St. 31°31′44″N 94°06′19″W	San Augustine	Recorded Texas Historic Landmark, part of San Augustine Residential Historic District
3	Ezekiel Cullen House	Ezekiel Cullen House	June 21, 1971 (#71000960)	207 S. Congress St. 31°31′35″N 94°06′28″W	San Augustine	Recorded Texas Historic Landmark, part of San Augustine Residential Historic District
4	William Garrett Plantation House	William Garrett Plantation House	March 25, 1977 (#77001474)	1 mi (1.6 km). W of San Augustine on TX 21; 31°32′07″N 94°08′23″W	San Augustine	Recorded Texas Historic Landmark
5	Horn-Polk House	Horn-Polk House	November 7, 1976 (#76002064)	717 W. Columbia St. 31°31′54″N 94°07′13″W	San Augustine	Recorded Texas Historic Landmark
6	Mission Nuestra Senora de los Dolores de los Ais Site	Mission Nuestra Senora de los Dolores de los Ais Site	December 16, 1977 (#77001475)	701 S. Broadway; 31°31′26″N 94°06′48″W	San Augustine	Part of a State Historic Site
7	San Augustine Commercial Historic District	San Augustine Commercial Historic District	April 3, 2007 (#07000269)	Roughly bounded by Main St., Montgomery St., Congress St., Broadway, Columbia St., property lines and Golden Way; 31°31′49″N 94°06′38″W	San Augustine	Includes State Antiquities Landmark, Recorded Texas Historic Landmarks
8	San Augustine County Courthouse and Jail	San Augustine County Courthouse and Jail	August 20, 2004 (#04000892)	Courthouse Sq. 31°31′48″N 94°06′40″W	San Augustine	State Antiquities Landmark, includes Recorded Texas Historic Landmarks, part of San Augustine Commercial Historic District
9	San Augustine Residential Historic District	San Augustine Residential Historic District	October 16, 2006 (#06000508)	Roughly surrounding TX 147, Texas 3230 and TX 2213; 31°31′38″N 94°06′29″W	San Augustine	Includes Recorded Texas Historic Landmarks

== See also ==
- National Register of Historic Places listings in Texas
- Recorded Texas Historic Landmarks in San Augustine County
