= Shirley Simons =

American architect (1897–1963)

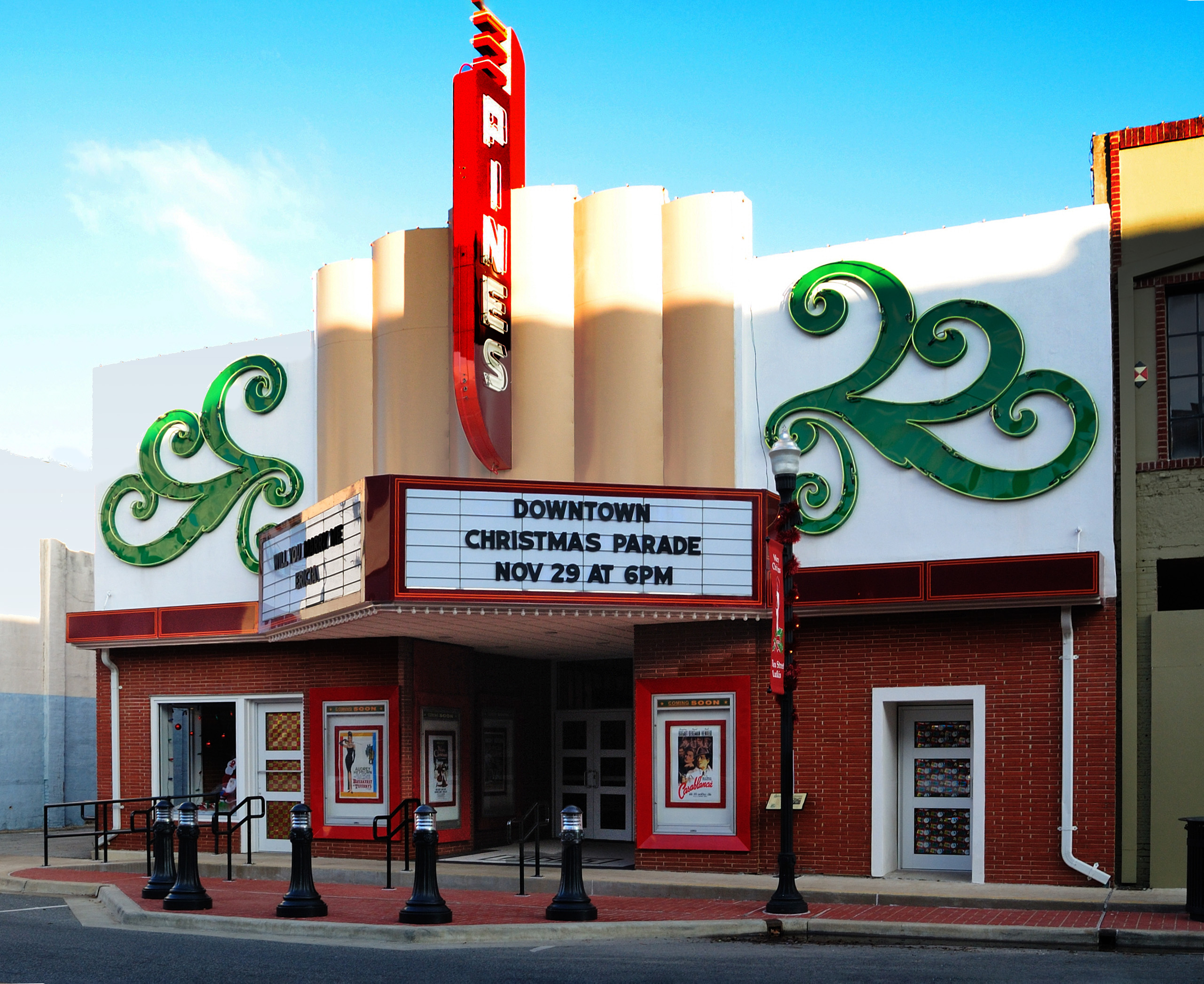
Pines Theater, Lufkin, Texas

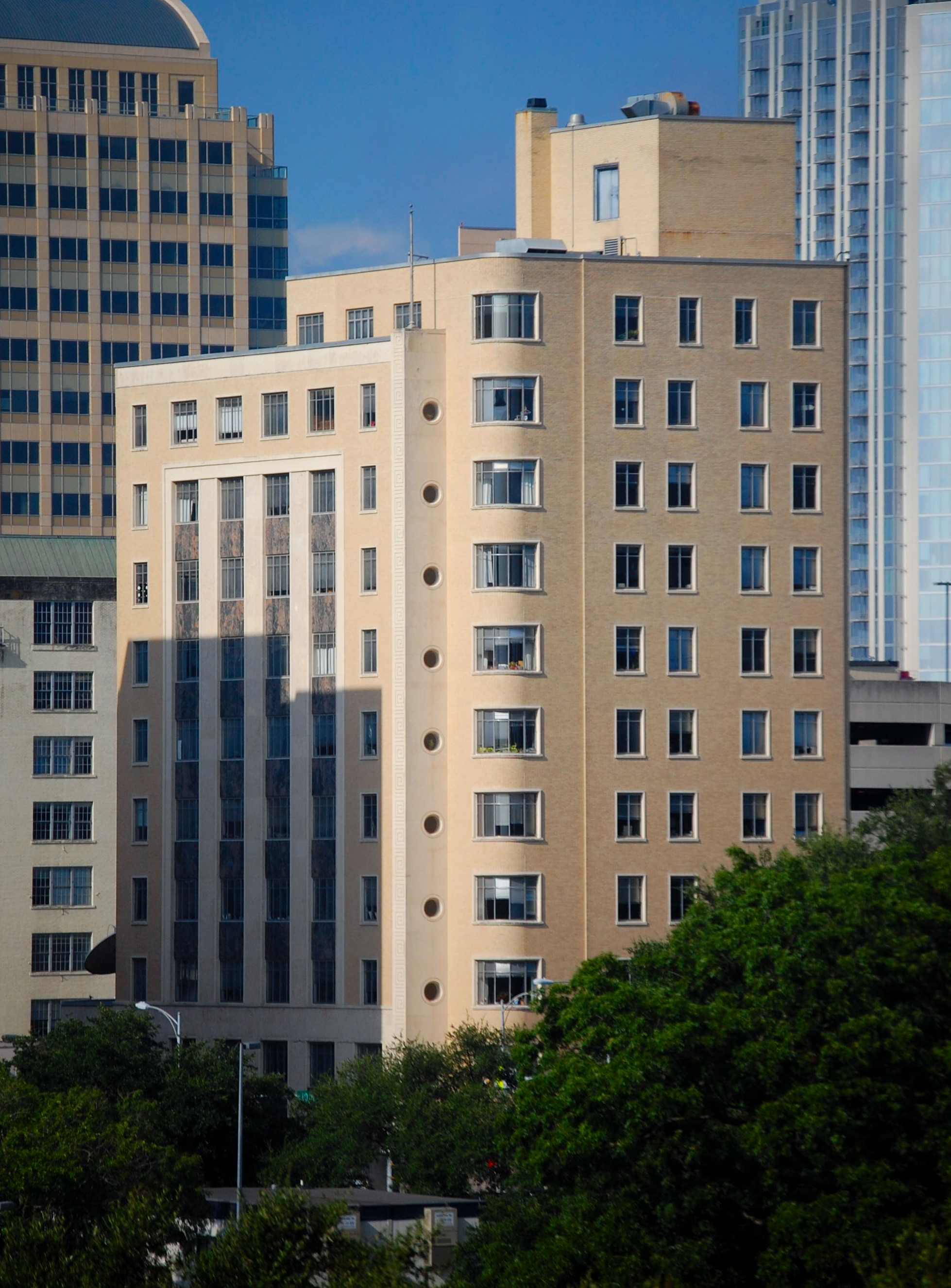
Austin Daily Tribune Building

Thomas Shirley Simons, Sr. (March 12, 1897 – August 1, 1963), commonly known as Shirley Simons was a prominent architect of Tyler, Texas. He was born in 1897 at Taylor, Texas, and raised in Fort Worth, Texas. He graduated from Rice Institute in 1919 with a Bachelor of Science in architecture. He also served in the field artillery during World War I from September through November 1918.

After practicing with William Ward Watkin in Houston, Simons moved to Lufkin, Texas in 1922 where he established his own architecture practice. In the late 1920s, he moved his architectural practice to Tyler, Texas. He remained active as an architect in Tyler until his death in 1963. Shirley's three sons (T. Shirley Simons, Jr., Edwin Simons, and Watson Townes Simons) later joined his architectural practice.

A number of Simons' works, including the Tyler City Hall, San Augustine County Courthouse and Jail, and Austin Daily Tribune Building, are listed on the National Register of Historic Places.

== Works in Tyler, Texas ==
- Tremont Place (1987), 615 Tremont Place, Tyler, TX 75701 (situated in the Azalea Residential Historic District) (Shirley Simons)
- Bergfeld Park (tennis courts, amphitheater and restrooms), part of the Azalea Residential Historic District, 1400 Block South Broadway, Tyler, Texas
- Robert and Mattie Fair House (1937), 905 South Chilton Avenue, Tyler, Texas (part of the Azalea Residential Historic District) (Shirley Simons, Sr. and Allen Campbell)
- Hanson-Cooper House (1931), 312 E. Charnwood, Tyler, Texas
- W. Howard and Vera Bryant House (1951), 2212 South Chilton Avenue, Tyler, Texas (part of the Azalea Residential Historic District)
- Marvin United Methodist Church (1942 remodel and parsonage), 300 W. Erwin St., Tyler, Texas, NRHP-listed
- Thomas and Edna Pollard House (1935), 801 Troup Highway, Tyler, Texas
- Ramey House (1935 interior remodel), 605 S. Broadway, Tyler, Texas (Simons, Shirley), NRHP-listed
- St. Gregory Elementary School, 400 South College Avenue, Tyler, Texas
- St. John's AF & AM Lodge, 323 W. Front Street, Tyler, Texas (Simons, T. Shirley Sr.), NRHP-listed
- Shirley Simons Residence, 118 West Fourth, Tyler, Texas (part of the Azalea Residential Historic District)
- Tyler City Hall (1938), 212 N. Bonner Avenue, Tyler, Texas (Simons, T. Shirley, Sr.), NRHP-listed
- Tyler Junior College original campus building plan
- Tyler Little Theatre (1939), 1014 W. Houston, Tyler, Texas
- Tyler U.S. Post Office and Courthouse, aka William M. Steger U.S. Courthouse (1934), 211 W. Ferguson Street, Tyler, Texas (Simons, Shirley), NRHP-listed
- White House, aka The Castle (1929), 116 Lindsey Lane, Tyler, Texas
- Willow Brook Country Club, 3205 West Erwin Street, Tyler, Texas
- Witherup Home (1932), 212 West Dobbs Street, Tyler, Texas
- Woman's Building (1931), 911 South Broadway, Tyler, Texas (part of the Azalea Residential Historic District) (Shirley Simons, Sr., and Sam R. Hill)

== Works in Lufkin, Texas ==
- Angelina Hotel, West Shepherd and South First, Lufkin, Texas
- Bowers-Felts House, 1213 Lotus Lane, Lufkin, Texas (Simons, Shirley), NRHP-listed
- Brookshire, Houston-Yeates House, 304 E. Howe Street, Lufkin, Texas (Simons, Shirley), NRHP-listed
- Central Ward Grammar School, Lufkin, Texas (demolished)
- Everitt-Cox House (1922 remodel), 418 Moore, Lufkin, Texas (Simons, Shirley), NRHP-listed
- First National Bank Building, northeast corner of Lufkin Avenue and First Street, Lufkin, Texas
- Kurth Memorial Library, Cotton Square facing Lufkin Avenue, Lufkin, Texas
- Kurth Ward Grammar School, Lufkin, Texas
- Pines Theatre, 113 South First Street, Lufkin, Texas, NRHP-listed
- School on South Raguet, Lufkin, Texas
- Shands Gymnasium, Lufkin, Texas (demolished)

== Works in other cities ==
- Austin Daily Tribune Building (1941), 920 Colorado, Austin, Texas (Simons, Shirley), NRHP-listed
- Houston Museum of Art
- Nacogdoches High School Gym and Auditorium, Nacogdoches, Texas
- San Augustine County Courthouse and Jail (1927), Courthouse Square, San Augustine, Texas (Simons, Shirley), NRHP-listed
- Stephen F. Austin University campus expansion (classrooms, administration buildings, president's residence, library, auditorium and fine arts building, men's and women's dormitory), Nacogdoches, Texas
- The Ashcroft House, 333 College Street, Sulphur Springs, Texas (a Recorded Texas Historic Landmark)
- University of Texas Student Health Center, Austin, Texas
