= St. John's AF & AM Lodge =

- U.S. National Register of Historic Places
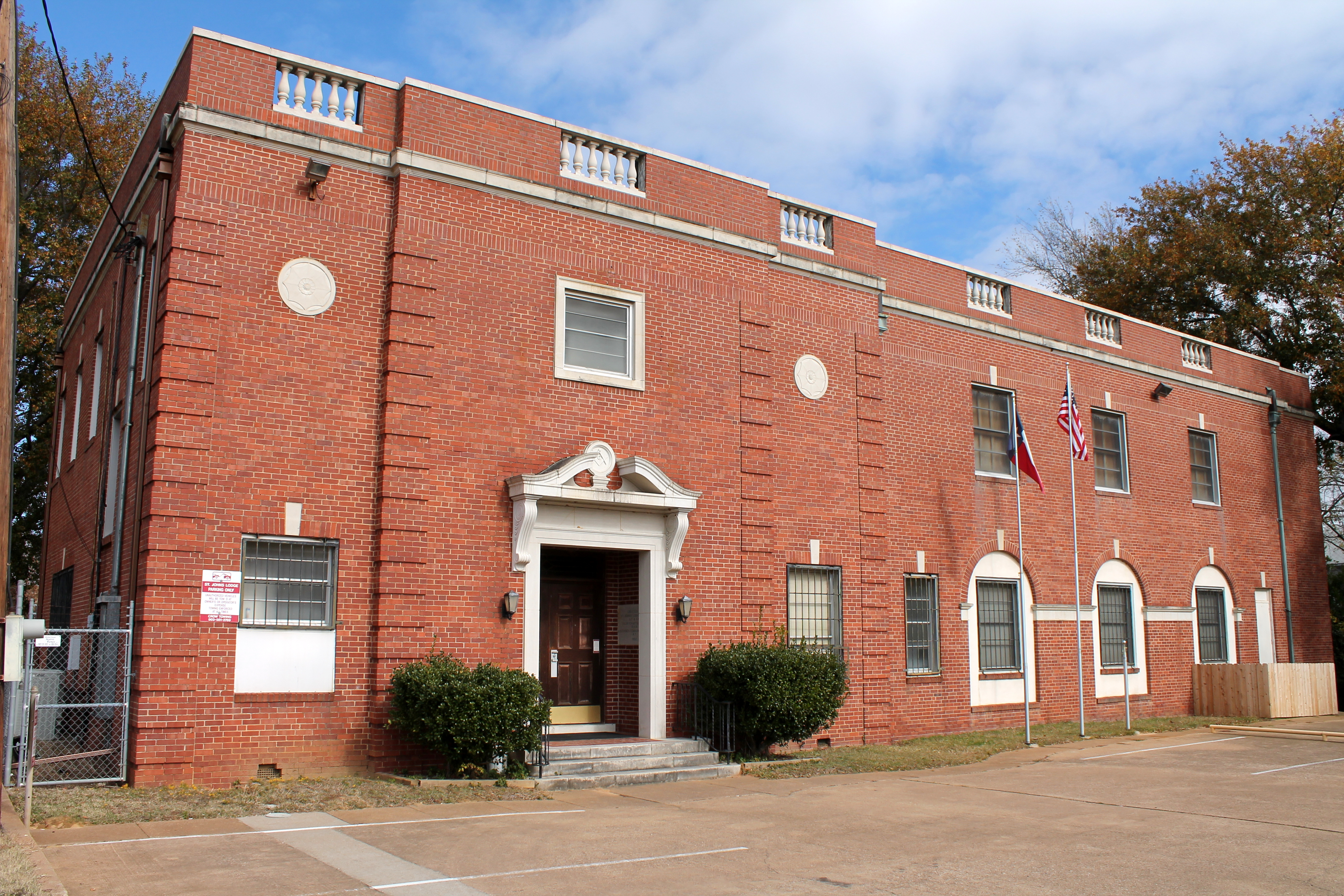
- St. John's Lodge in 2014

- Location within Texas Location within the United States
- Location: 323 W. Front St., Tyler, Texas
- Coordinates: 32°20′57″N 95°18′14″W
- Area: less than one acre
- Built: 1932
- Architect: Shirley Simons, et al.
- Architectural style: Colonial Revival
- NRHP reference No.: 05001403
- Added to NRHP: December 6, 2005

The St. John's A.F. & A.M. Lodge, also known as Tyler Masonic Lodge, refers to a Masonic Lodge in Tyler, Texas and also to its historic building, which is listed on the National Register of Historic Places.

The building, located on Front Street in Tyler, Texas, was built in 1902 by St. John's Lodge #53, a local Masonic lodge (the lodge still meets in the building).

The building was designed in Colonial Revival architecture by architect Shirley Simons. It was listed on the National Register in 2005. The listing included one contributing building and one contributing structure.

== See also ==
- National Register of Historic Places listings in Smith County, Texas
