= National Register of Historic Places listings in Angelina County, Texas =

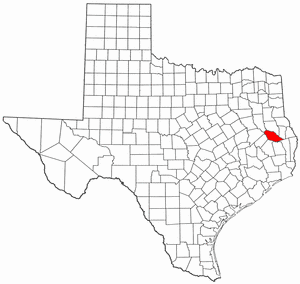
Location of Angelina County in Texas

This is a list of the National Register of Historic Places listings in Angelina County, Texas.

This is intended to be a complete list of properties listed on the National Register of Historic Places in Angelina County, Texas. There are 41 properties listed on the National Register in the county. Three properties are also Recorded Texas Historic Landmarks.

This National Park Service list is complete through NPS recent listings posted March 21, 2025.

== Current listings ==
The locations of National Register properties and may be seen in a mapping service provided.

	Name on the Register	Image	Date listed	Location	City or town	Description
1	Abercrombie-Cavanaugh House	Abercrombie-Cavanaugh House	December 22, 1988 (#88002794)	304 Paul Ave. 31°20′31″N 94°43′30″W	Lufkin	Historic Resources of Angelina County MRA
2	Angelina River Bridge		December 22, 1988 (#88002801)	US 59 over Angelina River; 31°27′25″N 94°43′34″W	Lufkin	Historic Resources of Angelina County MRA, bridge replaced 1998
3	Banks-Ogg House	Banks-Ogg House	December 22, 1988 (#88002771)	602 E Groesbeck St. 31°20′21″N 94°43′21″W	Lufkin	Historic Resources of Angelina County MRA
4	Behannon-Kenley House	Behannon-Kenley House	December 22, 1988 (#88002798)	317 Shepherd Ave. 31°20′15″N 94°43′34″W	Lufkin	Historic Resources of Angelina County MRA
5	Binion-Casper House	Binion-Casper House	July 19, 1989 (#88002785)	404 Mantooth Ave. 31°20′30″N 94°44′00″W	Lufkin	Historic Resources of Angelina County MRA
6	Bowers-Felts House	Bowers-Felts House	December 22, 1988 (#88002780)	1213 Lotus Ln. 31°20′27″N 94°44′42″W	Lufkin	Historic Resources of Angelina County MRA
7	Boynton-Kent House	Boynton-Kent House	December 22, 1988 (#88002779)	107 W Kerr St. 31°19′52″N 94°43′46″W	Lufkin	Historic Resources of Angelina County MRA
8	Houston Brookshire-Yeates House	Houston Brookshire-Yeates House	December 22, 1988 (#88002776)	304 E Howe St. 31°20′34″N 94°43′28″W	Lufkin	Historic Resources of Angelina County MRA
9	Byus-Kirkland House	Byus-Kirkland House	December 22, 1988 (#88002786)	411 Mantooth Ave. 31°20′27″N 94°44′00″W	Lufkin	Historic Resources of Angelina County MRA
10	Clark-Whitton House	Clark-Whitton House	December 22, 1988 (#88002792)	1865 Old Mill Rd. 31°21′30″N 94°44′57″W	Lufkin	Historic Resources of Angelina County MRA
11	Corstone Sales Company	Corstone Sales Company	December 22, 1988 (#88002797)	109-111 E Shepherd St. 31°20′17″N 94°43′43″W	Lufkin	Historic Resources of Angelina County MRA
12	Dunham Hill		December 22, 1988 (#88002803)	US 69 west of Huntington; 31°17′03″N 94°35′41″W	Huntington	Historic Resources of Angelina County MRA
13	Everitt-Cox House	Everitt-Cox House	December 22, 1988 (#88002789)	418 Moore Ave. 31°20′23″N 94°43′59″W	Lufkin	Historic Resources of Angelina County MRA
14	Fenley Commercial Building	Fenley Commercial Building	December 22, 1988 (#88002781)	112 E Lufkin Ave. 31°20′20″N 94°43′42″W	Lufkin	Historic Resources of Angelina County MRA
15	Gibbs-Flournoy House		December 22, 1988 (#88002804)	Farm to Market Road 844; 31°08′30″N 94°32′26″W	Manning	Recorded Texas Historic Landmark, Historic Resources of Angelina County MRA
16	S. W. Henderson-Bridges House		December 22, 1988 (#88002775)	202 Henderson St. 31°21′36″N 94°45′05″W	Lufkin	Historic Resources of Angelina County MRA
17	Humason-Pinkerton House	Humason-Pinkerton House	December 22, 1988 (#88002773)	602 Grove Ave. 31°20′33″N 94°44′01″W	Lufkin	Historic Resources of Angelina County MRA
18	Keltys Worker Housing	Keltys Worker Housing	December 22, 1988 (#88002784)	109 Maas; 31°21′38″N 94°45′10″W	Lufkin	Historic Resources of Angelina County MRA
19	A. C. Kennedy-Runnells House	A. C. Kennedy-Runnells House	December 22, 1988 (#88002772)	603 E Groesbeck St. 31°20′23″N 94°43′20″W	Lufkin	Historic Resources of Angelina County MRA
20	R. A. Kennedy-J. M. Lowrey House	R. A. Kennedy-J. M. Lowrey House	December 22, 1988 (#88002770)	519 E Groesbeck St. 31°20′23″N 94°43′22″W	Lufkin	Historic Resources of Angelina County MRA
21	J. H. Kurth House	J. H. Kurth House	December 22, 1988 (#88002791)	1860 Old Mill Rd. 31°21′30″N 94°44′53″W	Lufkin	Recorded Texas Historic Landmark, Historic Resources of Angelina County MRA
22	Kurth-Glover House	Kurth-Glover House	December 22, 1988 (#88002790)	1847 Old Mill Rd. 31°21′26″N 94°44′55″W	Lufkin	Historic Resources of Angelina County MRA
23	G. E. Lawrence House	G. E. Lawrence House	December 22, 1988 (#88002766)	2005 S Chestnut St. 31°18′48″N 94°42′30″W	Lufkin	Historic Resources of Angelina County MRA
24	Lufkin Land-Long Bell-Buck House	Lufkin Land-Long Bell-Buck House	December 22, 1988 (#88002783)	1218 Lufkin St. 31°20′10″N 94°42′59″W	Lufkin	Historic Resources of Angelina County MRA
25	Marsh-Smith House	Marsh-Smith House	December 22, 1988 (#88002796)	503 N Raguet St. 31°20′30″N 94°44′08″W	Lufkin	Recorded Texas Historic Landmark, Historic Resources of Angelina County MRA
26	McClendon-Abney Hardware Company	McClendon-Abney Hardware Company	December 22, 1988 (#88002782)	119 E Lufkin Ave. 31°20′20″N 94°43′41″W	Lufkin	Historic Resources of Angelina County MRA
27	McGilbert House		December 22, 1988 (#88002793)	1902 Old Mill Rd. 31°21′30″N 94°44′53″W	Lufkin	Historic Resources of Angelina County MRA
28	Newsom-Moss House	Newsom-Moss House	December 22, 1988 (#88002787)	420 Mantooth Ave. 31°20′29″N 94°44′02″W	Lufkin	Historic Resources of Angelina County MRA
29	Old Federal Building-Federal Courthouse	Old Federal Building-Federal Courthouse	December 22, 1988 (#88002799)	104 N Third St. 31°20′19″N 94°43′34″W	Lufkin	Historic Resources of Angelina County MRA
30	Parker-Bradshaw House	Parker-Bradshaw House	December 22, 1988 (#88002795)	213 N Raguet St. 31°20′22″N 94°44′05″W	Lufkin	Historic Resources of Angelina County MRA
31	Dr. Edward Percy-Abney House	Dr. Edward Percy-Abney House	December 22, 1988 (#88002778)	466 Jefferson Ave. 31°20′06″N 94°44′09″W	Lufkin	Historic Resources of Angelina County MRA
32	A. F. Perry and Myrtle-Pitmann House	A. F. Perry and Myrtle-Pitmann House	December 22, 1988 (#88002765)	402 S Bynum St. 31°20′01″N 94°44′16″W	Lufkin	Historic Resources of Angelina County MRA
33	C. W. Perry Archie-Hallmark House	C. W. Perry Archie-Hallmark House	December 22, 1988 (#88002764)	302 S. Bynum; 31°20′04″N 94°44′18″W	Lufkin	Historic Resources of Angelina County MRA
34	Pines Theatre	Pines Theatre	December 22, 1988 (#88002767)	113 S First St. 31°20′18″N 94°43′44″W	Lufkin	Historic Resources of Angelina County MRA
35	Rastus-Read House		December 22, 1988 (#88002768)	1509 S First St. 31°19′12″N 94°43′38″W	Lufkin	Historic Resources of Angelina County MRA, demolished
36	Russell-Arnold House		December 22, 1988 (#88002788)	121 W Menefee St. 31°19′38″N 94°43′43″W	Lufkin	Historic Resources of Angelina County MRA, demolished
37	Standley House		December 22, 1988 (#88002800)	1607 Tulane Dr. 31°19′01″N 94°43′23″W	Lufkin	Historic Resources of Angelina County MRA, demolished
38	Henry G. Temple House		December 22, 1988 (#88002802)	501 Hines Rd. 31°10′40″N 94°47′16″W	Diboll	Historic Resources of Angelina County MRA
39	Texas Highway Department Complex	Texas Highway Department Complex	December 22, 1988 (#88002769)	110 Forest Park; 31°21′26″N 94°43′02″W	Lufkin	Historic Resources of Angelina County MRA
40	Walter C. Trout-White House	Walter C. Trout-White House	December 22, 1988 (#88002777)	444 Jefferson Ave. 31°20′08″N 94°44′04″W	Lufkin	Historic Resources of Angelina County MRA
41	Howard Walker House		December 22, 1988 (#88002774)	503 Harmony Hill Rd. 31°18′32″N 94°43′13″W	Lufkin	Historic Resources of Angelina County MRA

== See also ==
- National Register of Historic Places listings in Texas
- Recorded Texas Historic Landmarks in Angelina County
