= Ramey House =

Historic house in Texas, United States

- U.S. National Register of Historic Places
- U.S. Historic district – Contributing property
- Recorded Texas Historic Landmark
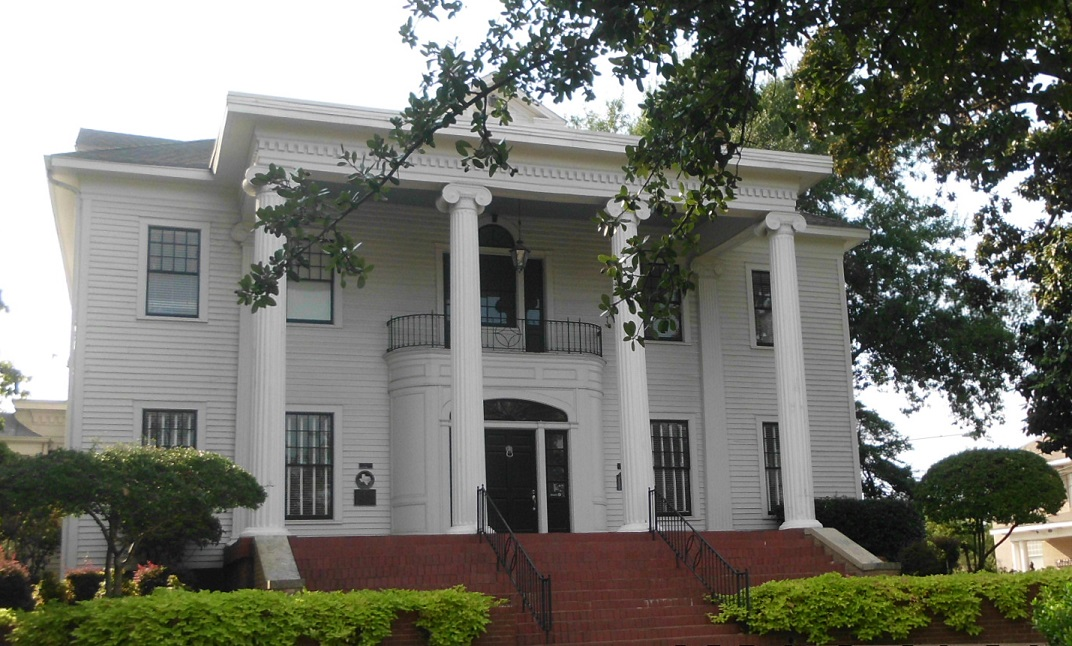
- Ramey House in 2014

- Location within Texas Location within the United States
- Location: 605 S. Broadway, Tyler, Texas
- Coordinates: 32°20′31″N 95°17′56″W
- Area: less than one acre
- Built: 1903
- Architect: Shirley Simons
- Architectural style: Colonial Revival
- Part of: Brick Streets Neighborhood Historic District (ID04000379)
- NRHP reference No.: 82001738
- RTHL No.: 12196

Significant dates
- Added to NRHP: October 29, 1982
- Designated CP: April 28, 2004
- Designated RTHL: 1997

The Ramey House, sometimes also called the Ramey–Grainger house, is a privately owned, early 20th-century Colonial Revival home and historic landmark located at 605 South Broadway Avenue in Tyler, Texas, occupying the southwest corner of Broadway Avenue and Houston Street. It was built in 1903 by its namesake, Thomas Brown Ramey, who was a Tyler businessman and jeweler. Ramey and his wife, Mary Josephine Ramey (née Spencer), were well known locally for their civic engagement and public commitments.

The 118-year-old structure is listed on the National Register of Historic Places and is designated as a Recorded Texas Historic Landmark by the Texas Historical Commission. The property itself is part of the Brick Streets Neighborhood Historic District and has, since 2004, been recognized as a contributing property there. The historical significance of the Ramey House is primarily architectural in nature.

The interior of the house was extensively renovated in 1935 under the purview of prominent Texas architect Shirley Simons (1897–1963). The Ramey House was converted into law offices in the early 1980s, during which time its exterior underwent a restoration process from 1980 to 1981. It was subsequently also known as Grainger and Petterson Law Offices, though it is no longer used as a law firm.

In 1982, the house gained official status as a historic landmark when it was listed on the National Register of Historic Places. The listing included one contributing building and one contributing site.

Today, the Ramey House functions as the headquarters of Stonewater Roofing, which completed another restoration of the house in 2021 after it had fallen into moderate disrepair over several years. Like earlier renovations and restorations of the house, the 2021 restoration honors and preserves the historic integrity of the structure.

On October 29, 2022 a fire broke out at the Ramey House that partially engulfed the second floor and attic space. An investigation is still ongoing into the cause of the fire.

== See also ==
- National Register of Historic Places listings in Smith County, Texas
- Recorded Texas Historic Landmarks in Smith County
