= Austin Daily Tribune Building =

Building in Texas, United States

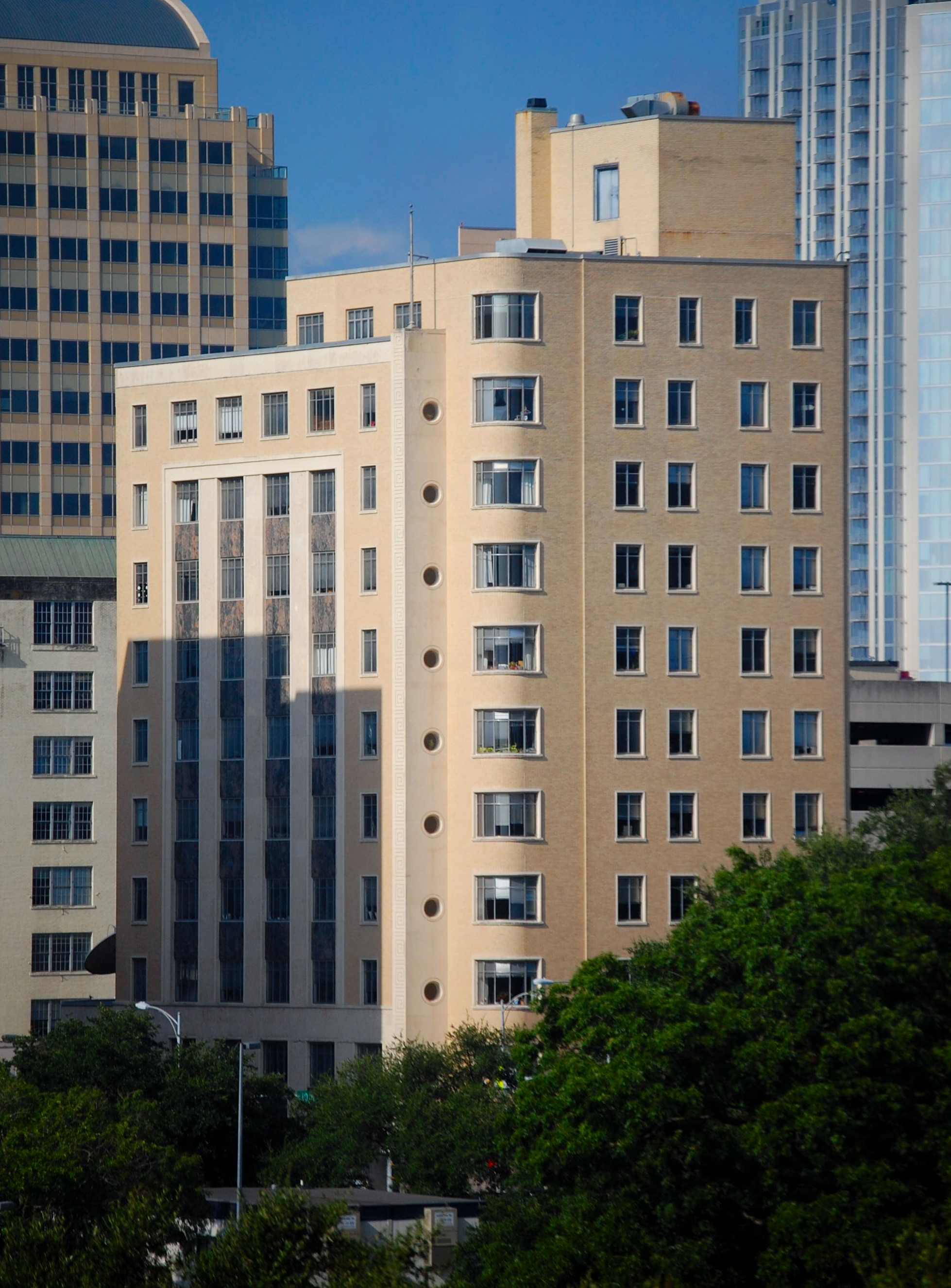
- Ernest O. Thompson State Office Bldg. in 2010
- Interactive map of the Austin Daily Tribune Building area

General information
- Architectural style: Moderne
- Location: 920 Colorado, Austin, Texas
- Coordinates: 30°16′26″N 97°44′35″W
- Completed: 1941

Height
- Roof: 136 ft (41 m)

Technical details
- Floor count: 11

Design and construction
- Architects: Simons, Shirley; et al.
- Austin Daily Tribune Building
- U.S. National Register of Historic Places
- Location within Texas Location within the United States
- Area: less than one acre
- NRHP reference No.: 00001358
- Added to NRHP: November 8, 2000

The Austin Daily Tribune Building, later known as the Ernest O. Thompson State Office Building, is a Moderne style office building located at 920 Colorado in Austin, Texas. It was built in 1941 as the headquarters of the Austin Daily Tribune, a short-lived newspaper that ceased publishing in 1942. The State of Texas purchased the building in 1945, and it was renamed in 1965 for Texas Railroad Commissioner Ernest O. Thompson. The building was designed by architect Shirley Simons and the firm of Page. It was listed on the National Register of Historic Places in 2000.
