= San Augustine County Courthouse and Jail =

- U.S. National Register of Historic Places
- U.S. Historic district – Contributing property
- Texas State Antiquities Landmark
- Recorded Texas Historic Landmark
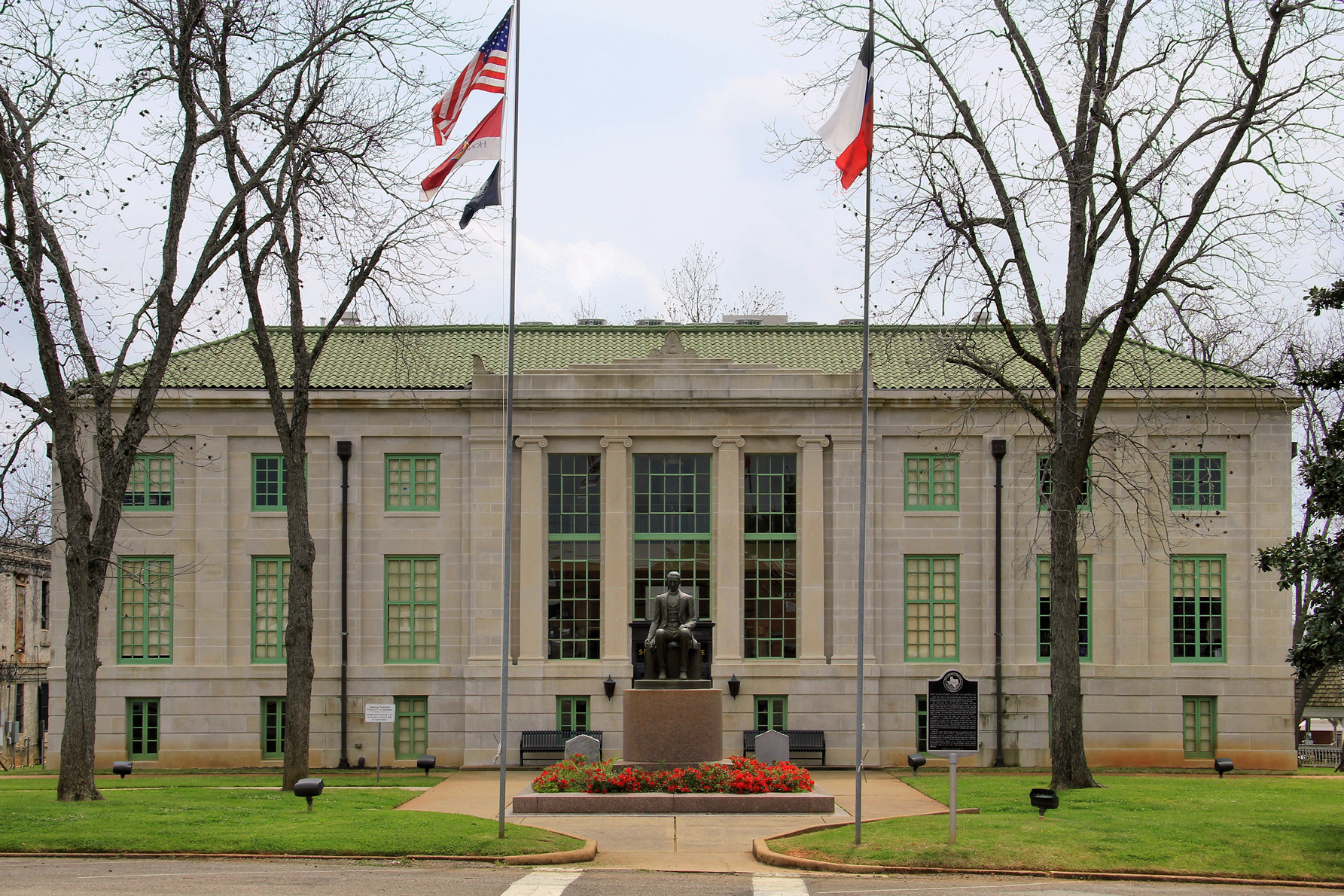
- San Augustine County Courthouse

- Location within Texas Location within the United States
- Location: Courthouse Sq., San Augustine, Texas
- Coordinates: 31°31′47″N 94°6′40″W
- Area: less than one acre
- Built: 1909
- Built by: Campbell and White
- Architect: Shirley Simons
- Architectural style: Classical Revival
- Part of: San Augustine Commercial Historic District (ID07000269)
- NRHP reference No.: 04000892
- TSAL No.: 8200003070
- RTHL No.: 12729 (Courthouse); 18848 (Jail)

Significant dates
- Added to NRHP: August 20, 2004
- Designated CP: April 3, 2007
- Designated TSAL: January 1, 2005
- Designated RTHL: 2001 (Courthouse); 2017 (Jail)

The San Augustine County Courthouse and Jail is a historic courthouse located at the corner of Main and Broadway in San Augustine, Texas. The structure was designed by architect Shirley Simons and built in 1927 by the firm of Campbell and White. The courthouse has an exterior facade made of Texas lueders limestone with green Ludowicki tile on the roof and matching trim. The building reflects a Classical Revival style of architecture. The building includes one of the largest courtrooms in East Texas, featuring two-story Palladian-style windows. A statue of James Pinckney Henderson, the first Governor of Texas, was installed in front of the courthouse in 1937. The courthouse was listed on the National Register of Historic Places in 2004. The listing included two contributing buildings and one contributing object. The Texas Historical Commission provided San Augustine County with a $3.7 million grant to restore the courthouse.

== See also ==
- National Register of Historic Places listings in San Augustine County, Texas
- Recorded Texas Historic Landmarks in San Augustine County
