= Lutcher Memorial Church Building =

Historic church in Texas, United States

- U.S. National Register of Historic Places
- Recorded Texas Historic Landmark
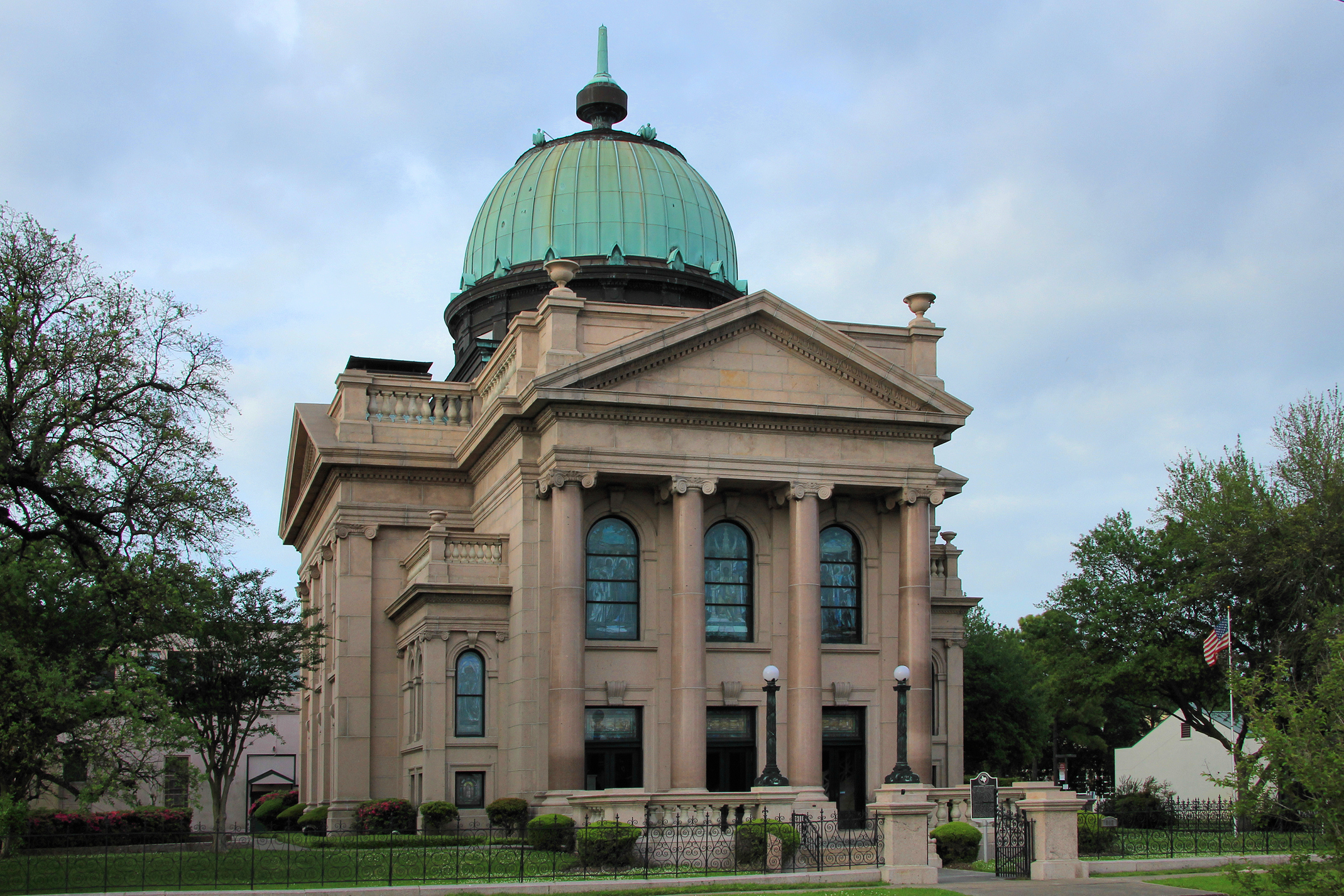
- Lutcher Memorial Church Building in 2015

- Location within Texas Location within the United States
- Location: 902 W. Green Ave., Orange, Texas
- Coordinates: 30°5′36″N 93°44′16″W
- Area: 4 acres (1.6 ha)
- Built: 1912
- Architect: James Oliver Hogg
- Architectural style: Classical Revival
- Website: First Presbyterian Church of Orange
- NRHP reference No.: 82004517
- RTHL No.: 11496

Significant dates
- Added to NRHP: September 9, 1982
- Designated RTHL: 1978

Lutcher Memorial Church Building, now the First Presbyterian Church of Orange, Texas, is a historic church at 902 W. Green Avenue in Orange, Texas, United States.

It was built in 1912 and added to the National Register of Historic Places in 1982.

== See also ==
- National Register of Historic Places listings in Orange County, Texas
- Recorded Texas Historic Landmarks in Orange County
