= William M. Steger Federal Building and United States Courthouse =

- Tyler US Post Office and Courthouse
- U.S. National Register of Historic Places
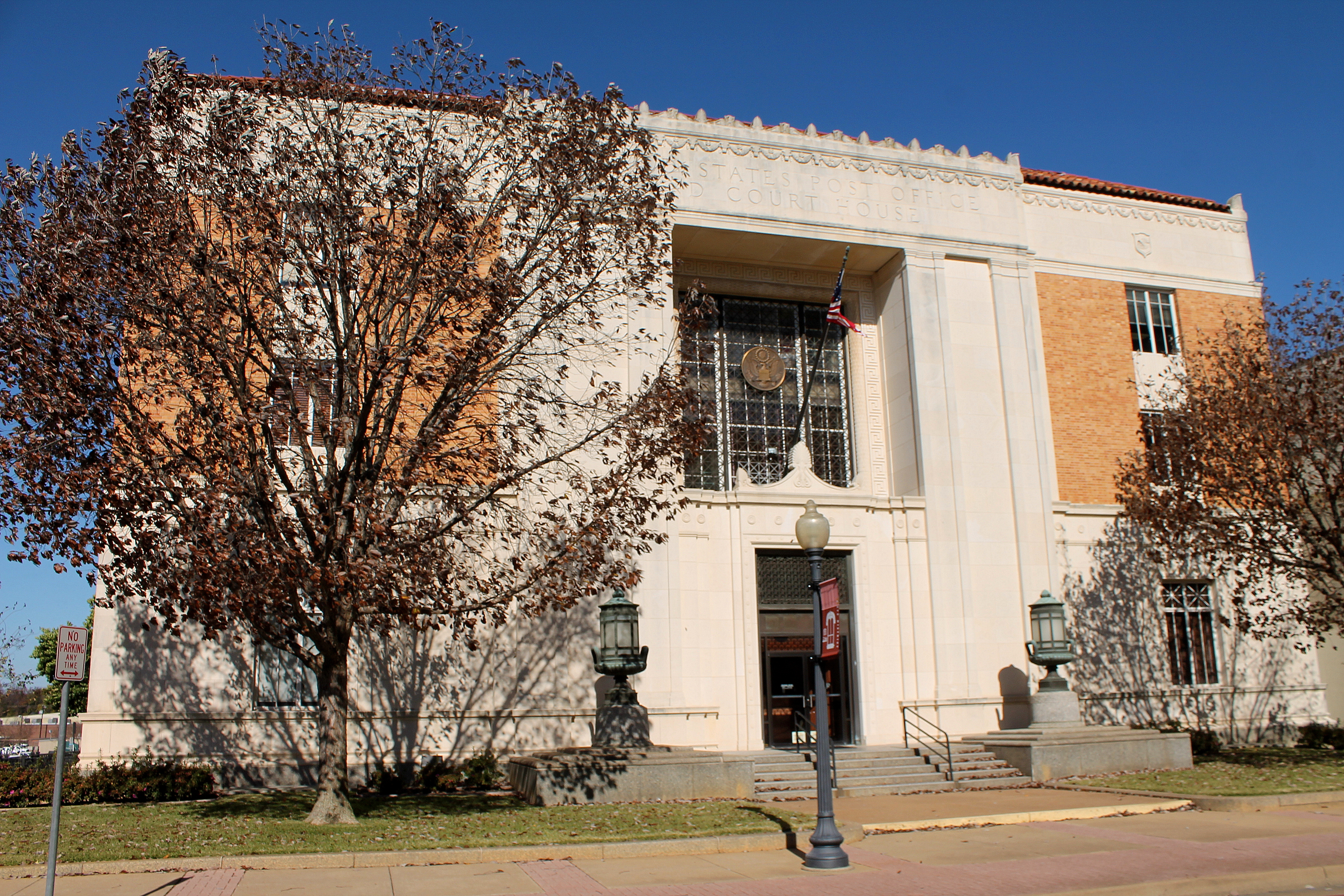
- Steger Federal Building in 2014

- Location within Texas Location within the United States
- Interactive map showing the location for Tyler US Post Office and Courthouse
- Location: 211 W. Ferguson St., Tyler, Texas
- Coordinates: 32°21′4″N 95°18′9″W
- Area: 1 acre (0.40 ha)
- Built: 1933-1934
- Built by: Ralph Sollitt and Sons
- Architect: Shirley Simons
- Architectural style: Classical Revival
- NRHP reference No.: 01000433
- Added to NRHP: April 25, 2001

The William M. Steger Federal Building and United States Courthouse is a historic government building built in Tyler, Texas. It was built during 1933–1934 in a restrained Classical Revival style. It served historically as a courthouse, post office, and a government office building. The building was listed on the National Register of Historic Places in 2001 as the Tyler US Post Office and Courthouse.

It was designed by local architect Shirley Simons with supervision by the Office of the Supervising Architect under James A. Wetmore. Its materials include a dark gray mottled granite on the ground floor, light buff limestone cladding the first floor, salmon-colored brick on the second and third floors. Acroterions appear at each corner of a parapet.

== See also ==
- National Register of Historic Places listings in Smith County, Texas
