= McGilbert House =

Historic house in Texas, United States

- U.S. National Register of Historic Places
- Location within Texas Location within the United States
- Location: 1902 Old Mill Rd., Lufkin, Texas
- Coordinates: 31°21′32″N 94°44′52″W
- Area: less than one acre
- Built: 1885
- Architectural style: Vernacular Victorian
- MPS: Angelina County MRA
- NRHP reference No.: 88002793
- Added to NRHP: December 22, 1988

McGilbert House is a historic house in Lufkin, Texas. It was listed on the National Register of Historic Places in 1988.

It is a one-story frame house with lap siding and a shed porch supported by wood posts. It was observed to be a rare surviving example of early company housing in Texas, and was deemed a "good example of worker housing associated with the Angelina County Lumber Mill and the company town of Keltys."

== See also ==
- National Register of Historic Places listings in Angelina County, Texas
