= Houston Brookshire–Yeates House =

Historic house in Texas, United States

- U.S. National Register of Historic Places
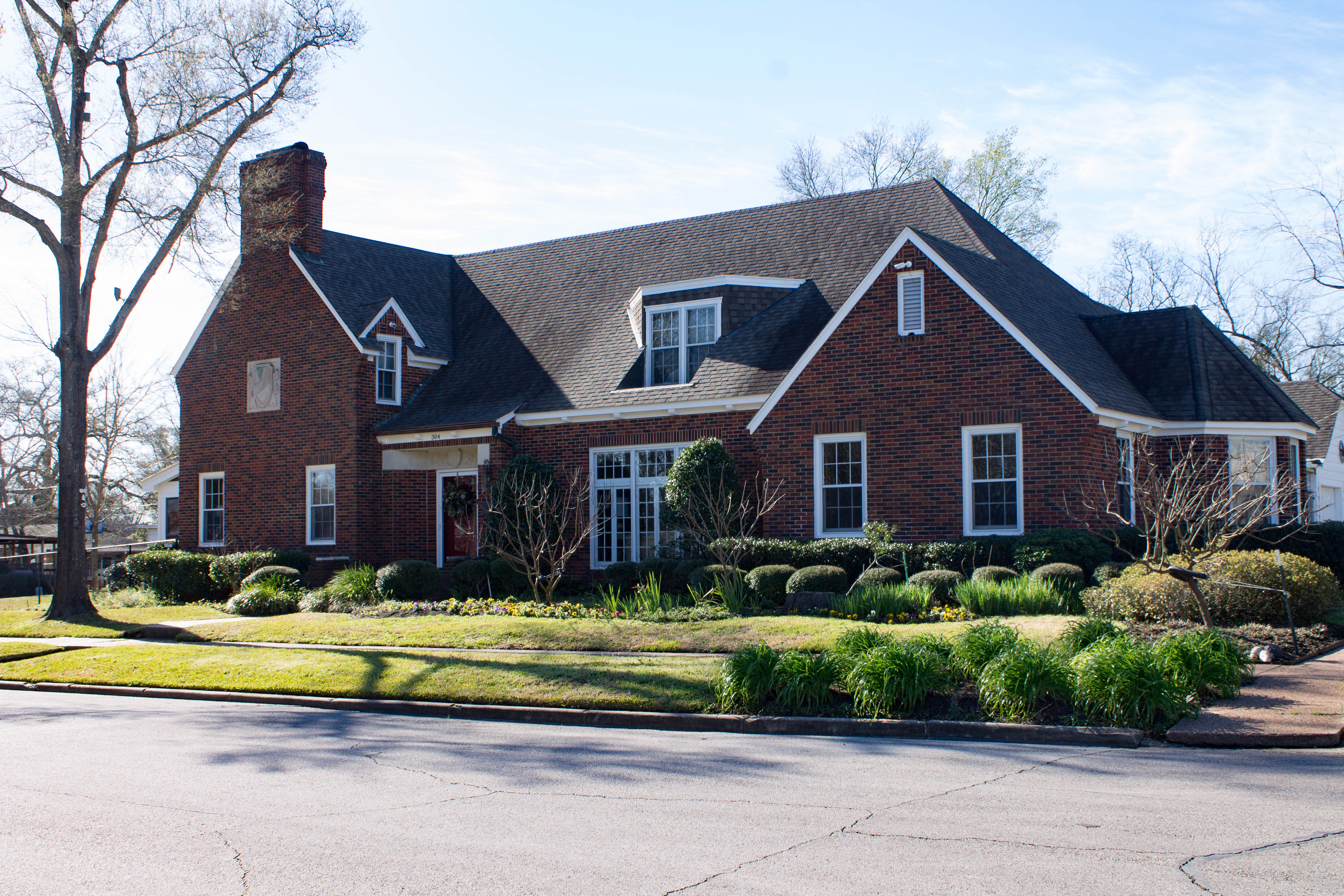
- Brookshire–Yeates House in 2016

- Location within Texas Location within the United States
- Location: 304 Howe St., East, Lufkin, Texas
- Coordinates: 31°20′34″N 94°43′28″W
- Area: less than one acre
- Built: 1920
- Architect: Shirley Simons
- Architectural style: Tudor Revival
- MPS: Angelina County MRA
- NRHP reference No.: 88002776
- Added to NRHP: December 22, 1988

The Houston Brookshire–Yeates House at 304 Howe St., East, in Lufkin, Texas is a Tudor Revival house that was built in 1920. It was designed by prominent local architect Shirley Simons. It was listed on the National Register of Historic Places in 1988.

It is one of several Tudor Revival buildings designed by Simons in Lufkin; other NRHP-listed ones are the C. W. Perry Archie–Hallmark House, the A. F. Perry and Myrtle–Pitmann House, and the Bowers–Felts House (c.1928–1937).

== See also ==
- National Register of Historic Places listings in Angelina County, Texas
