= William Garrett Plantation =

Historic house in Texas, United States

- William Garrett Plantation House
- U.S. National Register of Historic Places
- Recorded Texas Historic Landmark
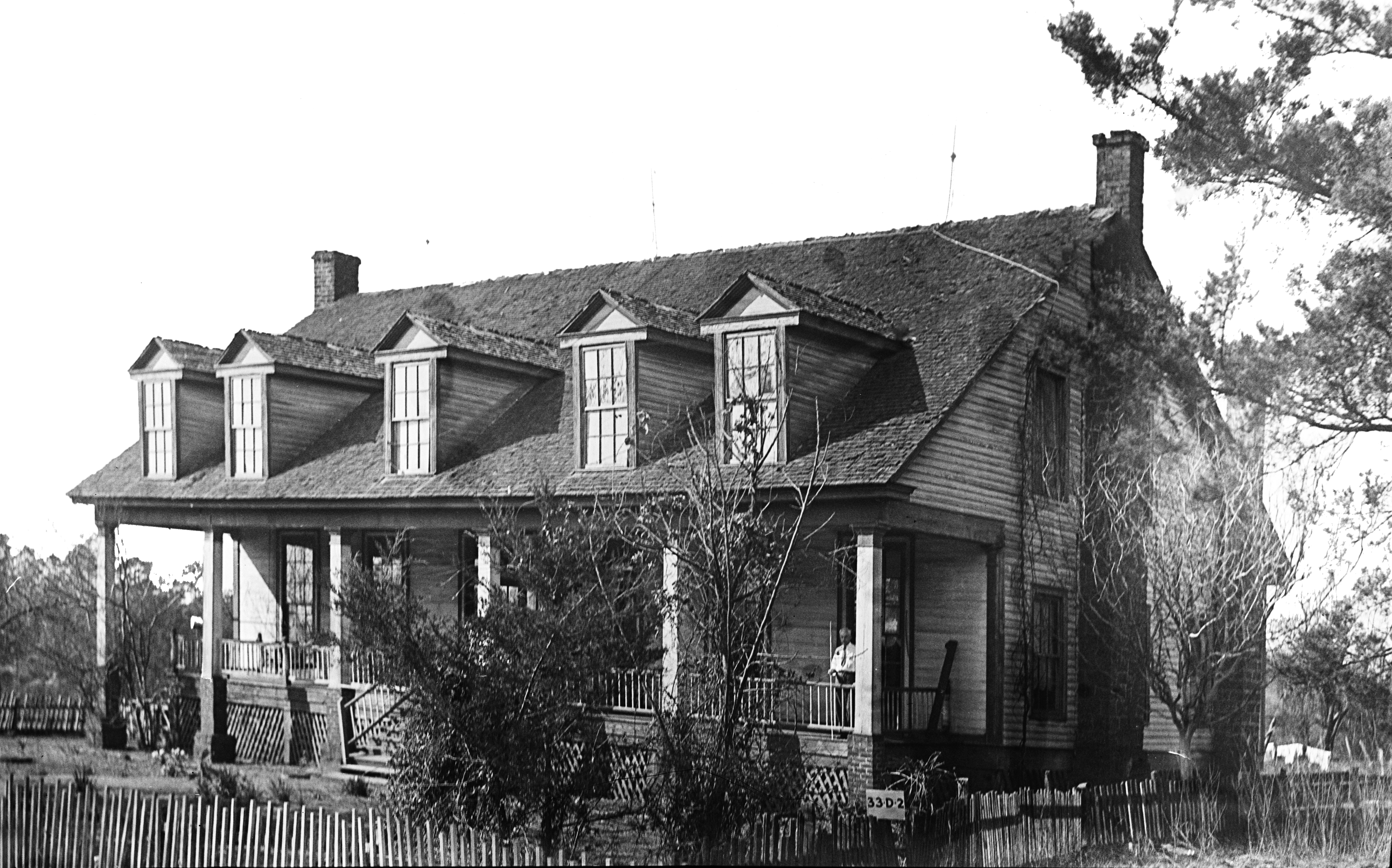
- Plantation house in 1934

- Location within Texas Location within the United States
- Nearest city: San Augustine, Texas
- Coordinates: 31°32′7″N 94°8′23″W
- Area: 7.5 acres (3.0 ha)
- Built: 1861
- Architectural style: Greek Revival, Texas Frontier
- NRHP reference No.: 77001474
- RTHL No.: 7607

Significant dates
- Added to NRHP: March 25, 1977
- Designated RTHL: 1962

The William Garrett Plantation is a plantation complex with a plantation house located near the town of San Augustine in San Augustine County, Texas. The house was "Texas frontier architecture" with some elements of Greek Revival and is notable for its "grandiose" scale.

The National Register of Historic Places listed it in 1977.

Enslaved people built the house in 1861 with lumber from a Garrett sawmill and rock from a Garrett quarry. It faced the main road through the area, the El Camino Real-Kings Highway, and is now about .25 miles (0.40 km) away from the main road due to road realignment.

== See also ==
- National Register of Historic Places listings in San Augustine County, Texas
- Recorded Texas Historic Landmarks in San Augustine County
