= Everitt–Cox House =

Historic house in Texas, United States

- U.S. National Register of Historic Places
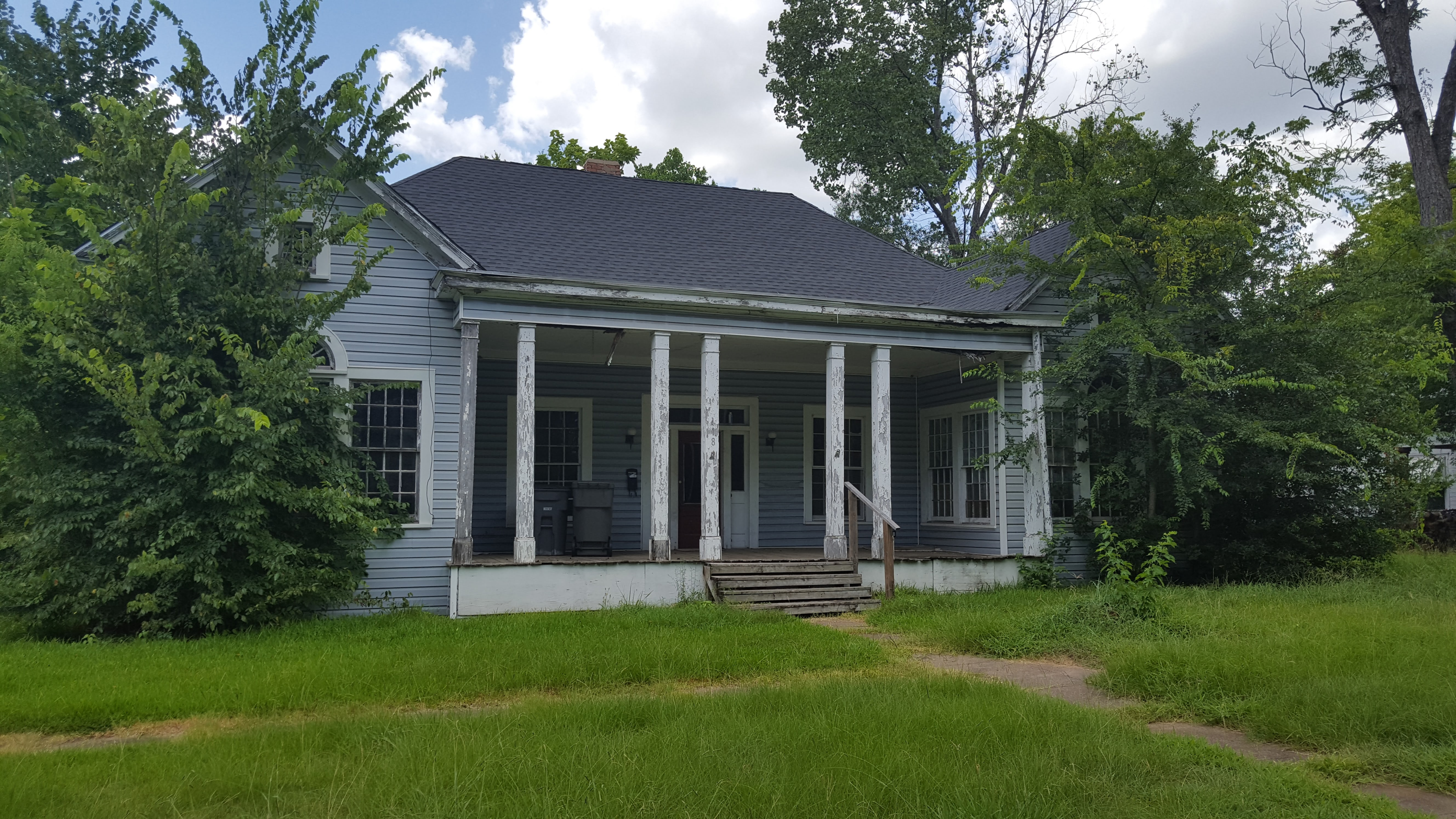
- Everitt–Cox House in 2016

- Location within Texas Location within the United States
- Location: 418 Moore Ave., Lufkin, Texas
- Coordinates: 31°20′21″N 94°43′57″W
- Area: less than one acre
- Built: 1892
- Architect: Shirley Simons
- Architectural style: Classical Revival, Late Victorian
- MPS: Angelina County MRA
- NRHP reference No.: 88002789
- Added to NRHP: December 22, 1988

The Everitt–Cox House is a historic house located at 418 Moore in Lufkin, Texas. Built in 1892 in a simple Victorian style, the house was remodeled in 1922 with Classical Revival details designed by architect Shirley Simons. It was listed on the National Register of Historic Places in 1988.

== See also ==
- National Register of Historic Places listings in Angelina County, Texas
