= National Register of Historic Places listings in Orange County, Texas =

Location of Orange County in Texas

This is a list of the National Register of Historic Places listings in Orange County, Texas.

This is intended to be a complete list of properties and districts listed on the National Register of Historic Places in Orange County, Texas. There are one district, six individual properties, and one former property listed on the National Register in the county. Five individually listed properties and the former property are Recorded Texas Historic Landmarks.

This National Park Service list is complete through NPS recent listings posted March 21, 2025.

== Current listings ==
The locations of National Register properties and districts may be seen in a mapping service provided.

| | Name on the Register | Image | Date listed | Location | City or town | Description |
|---|---|---|---|---|---|---|
| 1 | Cow Bayou Swing Bridge | Cow Bayou Swing Bridge | May 10, 2010 (#10000252) | SH 73/87 1.13 mi NE of jct with FM 1442; 30°02′42″N 93°49′15″W | Bridge City | Recorded Texas Historic Landmark; Historic Bridges of Texas, 1866-1945 MPS |
| 2 | Joseph and Annie Lucas House | Joseph and Annie Lucas House | October 17, 1997 (#97001233) | 812 W. Pine St. 30°05′43″N 93°44′24″W | Orange | Recorded Texas Historic Landmark |
| 3 | Lutcher Memorial Church Building | Lutcher Memorial Church Building | September 9, 1982 (#82004517) | 902 W. Green Ave. 30°05′36″N 93°44′16″W | Orange | Recorded Texas Historic Landmark |
| 4 | Navy Park Historic District | | December 22, 1999 (#99001600) | Roughly bounded by W. Dewey Ave., Farragut St., Cooper's Gully Tract and 6th Ave. 30°06′27″N 93°43′54″W | Orange | |
| 5 | Port Arthur-Orange Bridge | Port Arthur-Orange Bridge | October 10, 1996 (#96001127) | TX 87 at the Jefferson and Orange County line 29°58′47″N 93°52′18″W | Groves | Historic Bridges of Texas, 1866-1945 MPS; extends into Jefferson County |
| 6 | Sims House | Sims House | March 26, 1980 (#80004143) | 905 Division St. 30°05′22″N 93°44′18″W | Orange | Recorded Texas Historic Landmark |
| 7 | W. H. Stark House | W. H. Stark House | December 12, 1976 (#76002056) | 611 W. Green Ave. 30°05′34″N 93°44′07″W | Orange | Recorded Texas Historic Landmark |

== Former listing ==
| | Name on the Register | Image | Date listed | Date removed | Location | City or town | Description |
|---|---|---|---|---|---|---|---|
| 1 | Woodmen of the World Lodge-Phoenix Camp No. 32 | | January 19, 1996 (#95001551) | November 17, 2010 | 110 Border St. 30°05′21″N 93°44′15″W | Orange | Recorded Texas Historic Landmark; significantly damaged by Hurricanes Rita and Ike. Demolished June 23, 2010. |

== See also ==
- National Register of Historic Places listings in Texas
- Recorded Texas Historic Landmarks in Orange County
