= Bowers–Felts House =

Historic house in Texas, United States

- U.S. National Register of Historic Places
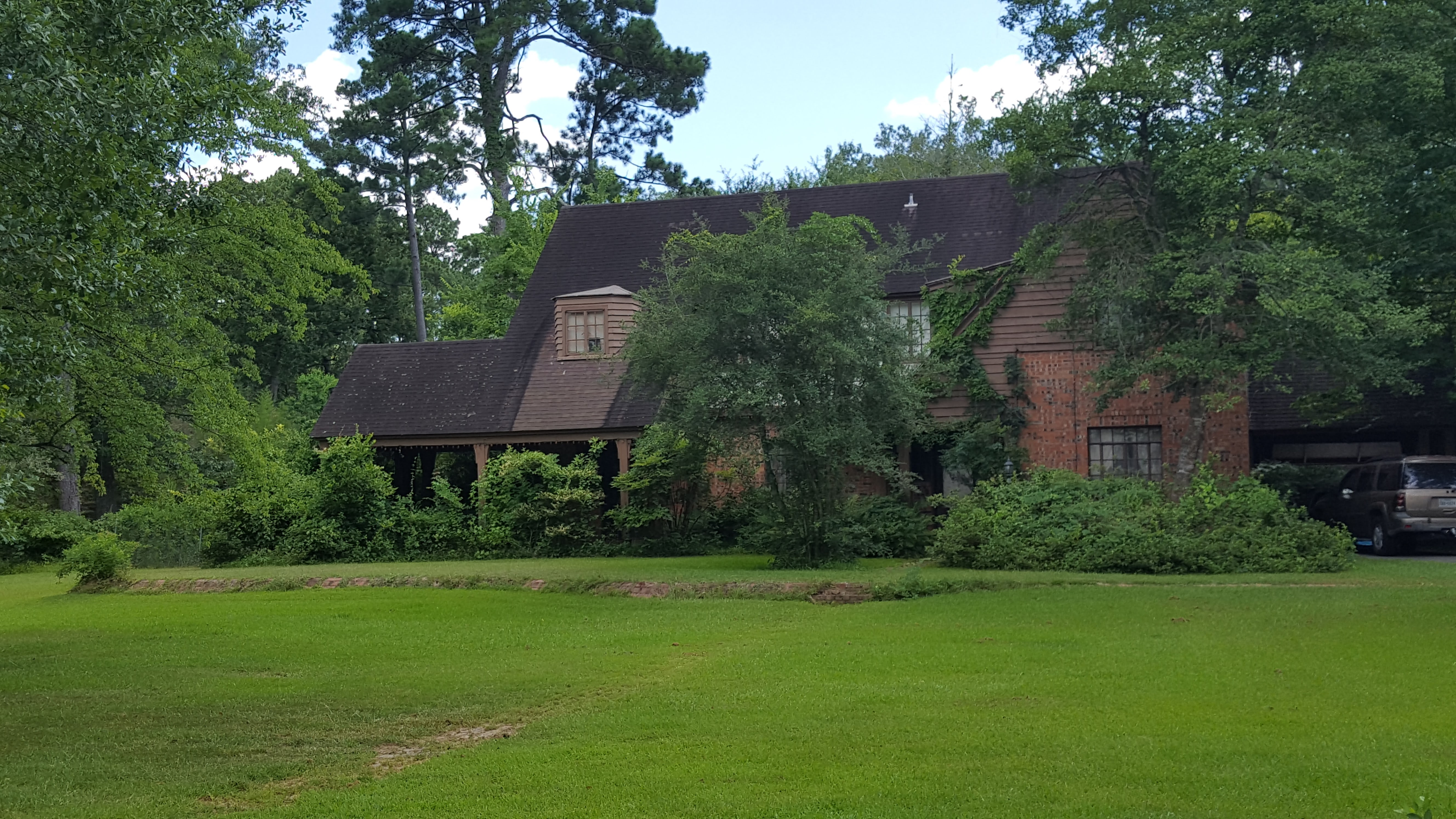
- Bowers–Felts House in 2016

- Location within Texas Location within the United States
- Location: 1213 Lotus Ln., Lufkin, Texas
- Coordinates: 31°20′27″N 94°44′42″W
- Area: less than one acre
- Built: 1928
- Architect: Shirley Simons
- Architectural style: Tudor Revival
- MPS: Angelina County MRA
- NRHP reference No.: 88002780
- Added to NRHP: December 22, 1988

The Bowers–Felts House on Lotus Lane in Lufkin, Texas was designed by architect Shirley Simons and was built c. 1928–1937. It was listed on the National Register of Historic Places in 1988.

It is a two-story masonry Tudor Revival-style house that is felt to be one of the best examples of Shirley Simons' works in that style.

It is one of several Tudor Revival buildings designed by Simons in Lufkin; other NRHP-listed ones are the C. W. Perry Archie–Hallmark House, the A. F. Perry and Myrtle–Pitmann House, and the Houston Brookshire–Yeates House (1920).

== See also ==
- National Register of Historic Places listings in Angelina County, Texas
