= Pines Theater =

- U.S. National Register of Historic Places
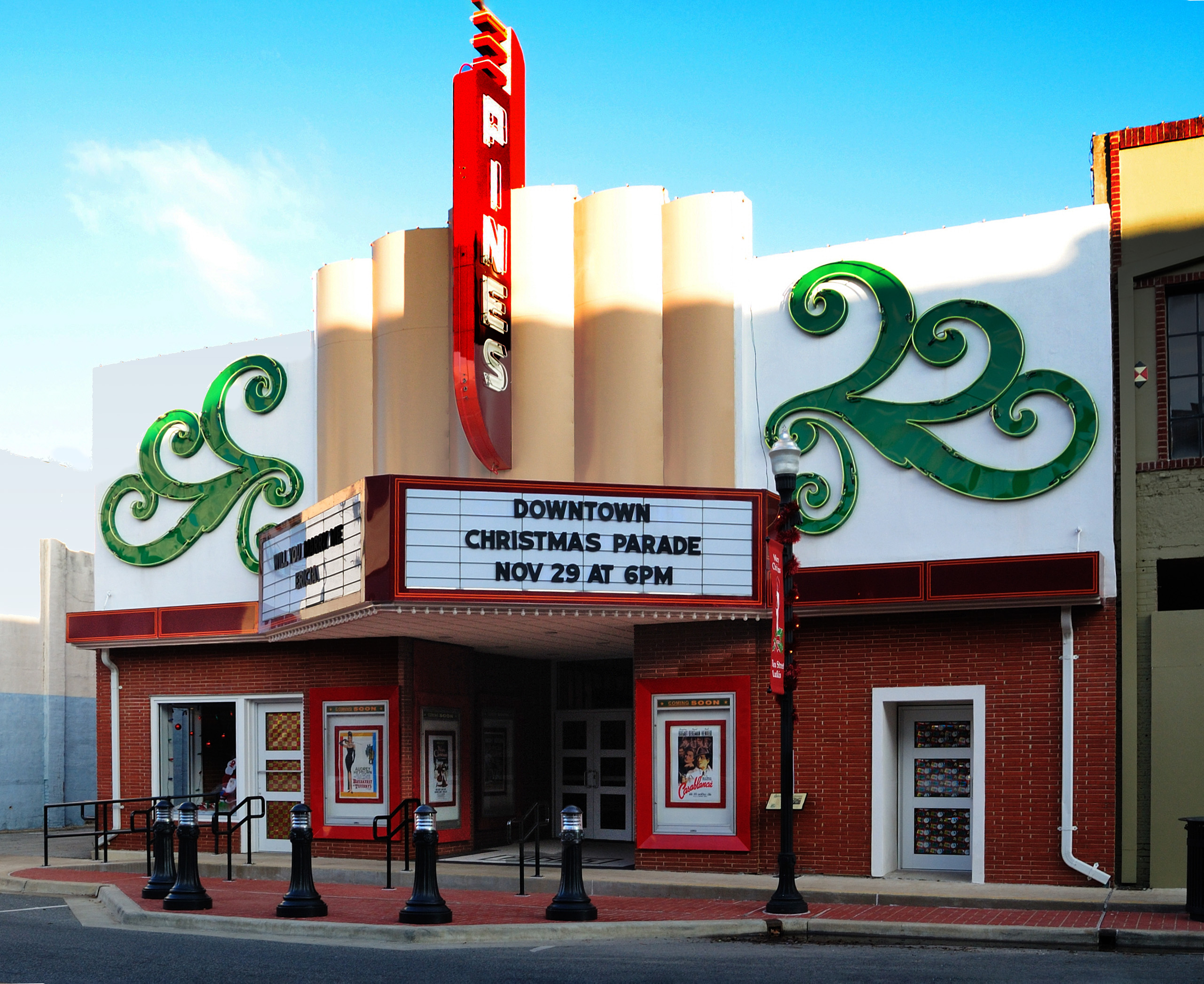
- Pines Theatre in 2011

- Location within Texas Location within the United States
- Location: 113 First St., South, Lufkin, Texas
- Coordinates: 31°20′18″N 94°43′43″W
- Area: less than one acre
- Built: 1925
- Architect: W.P. Berry
- Architectural style: Moderne
- MPS: Angelina County MRA
- NRHP reference No.: 88002767
- Added to NRHP: December 22, 1988

The Pines Theater is a historic movie theater located in Lufkin, Texas. Built in 1925, it was designed by architect Shirley Simons and/or W. P. Berry in Moderne style.

It was listed on the National Register of Historic Places in 1988. The City of Lufkin purchased the theater in 2007. The City has undertaken extensive restoration efforts on the theater from 2009 to 2012.

== See also ==
- National Register of Historic Places listings in Angelina County, Texas
