= Polk County Courthouse and 1905 Courthouse Annex =

- U.S. National Register of Historic Places
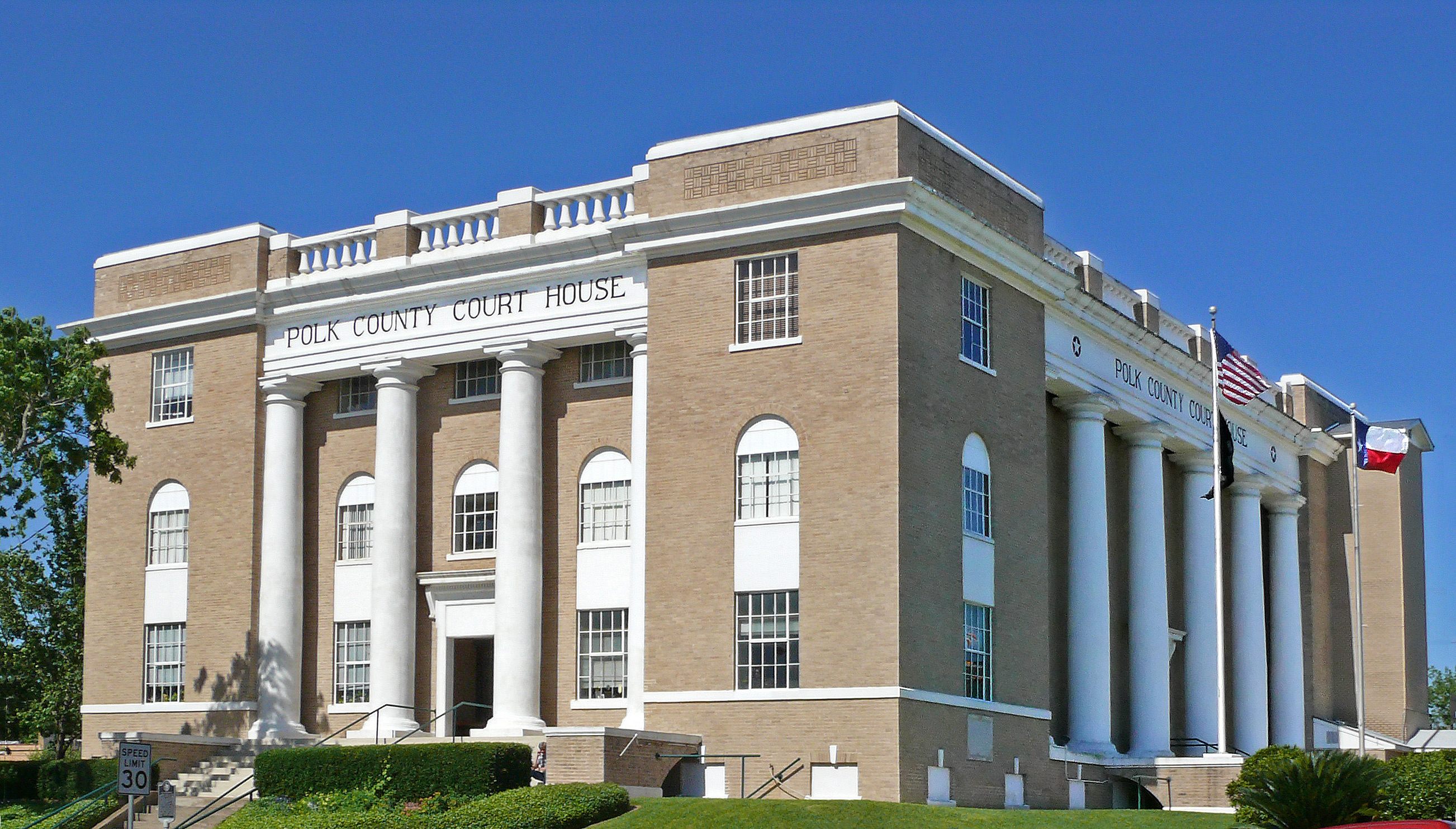
- Image from 2009

- Location within Texas Location within the United States
- Location: Washington at Church st., Livingston, Texas, U.S.
- Coordinates: 30°42′38″N 94°56′1″W
- Built: 1900
- Architect: Green, Lewis Sterling McLelland & Fink
- Architectural style: Classical/revival
- NRHP reference No.: 01000060
- Added to NRHP: February 2, 2001

The Polk County Courthouse and 1905 Courthouse Annex is a historical site located in Livingston, Polk County, Texas, USA.

The annex was built in 1900 and remained significant until 1974. It was designed for governmental uses. The architects Green, Lewis Sterling McLelland and Fink designed the structure with a classical/revival design. In 2001, it was added to the National Register of Historic Places.

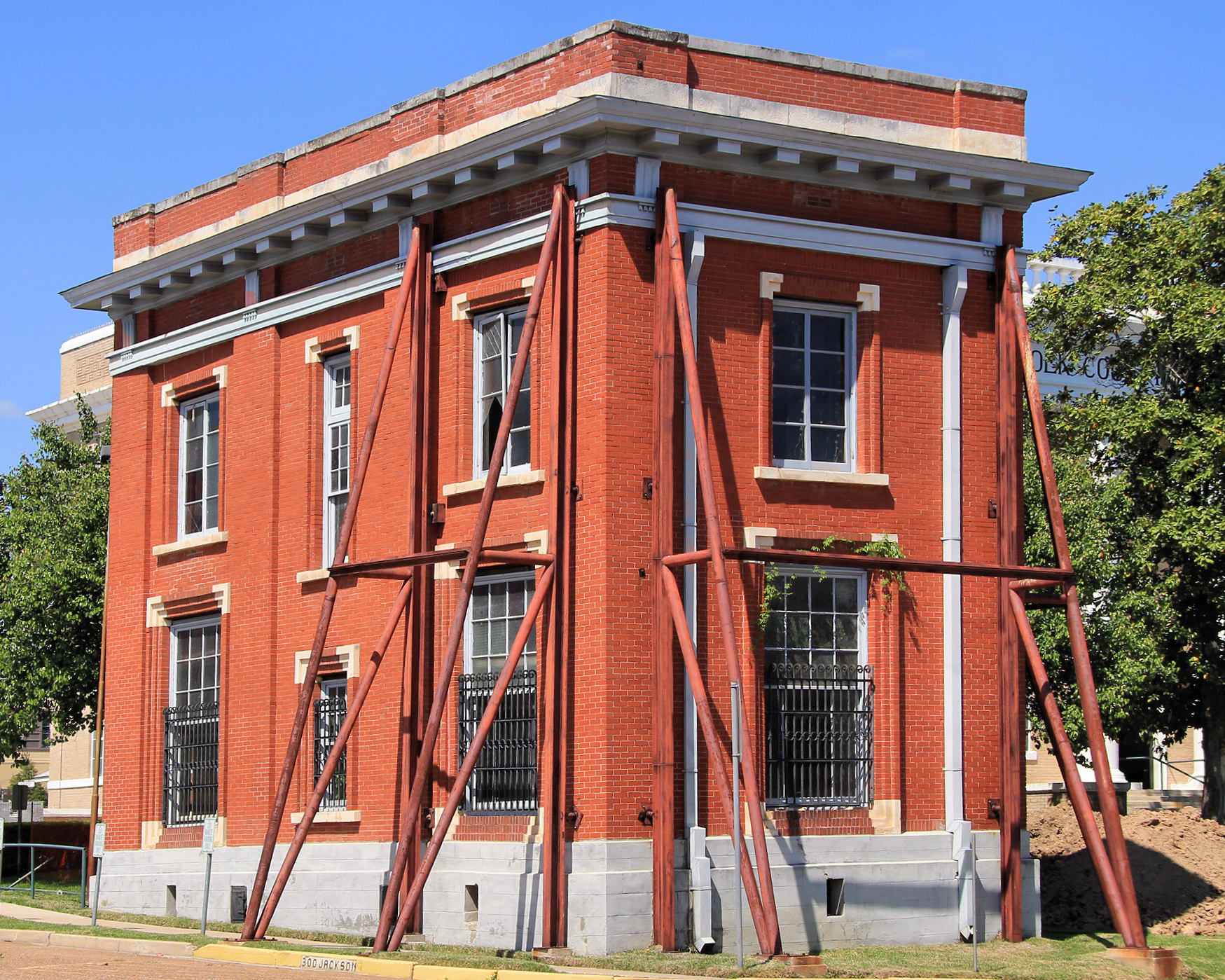
Polk County 1905 Courthouse Annex

== See also ==
- National Register of Historic Places listings in Polk County, Texas
