= Angelina River Bridge =

- U.S. National Register of Historic Places
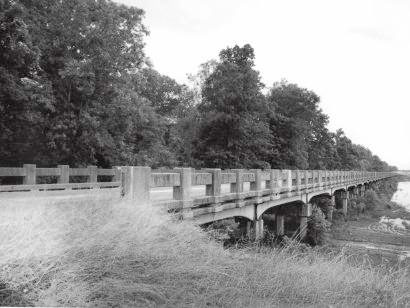

- Location within Texas Location within the United States
- Location: US 59 over Angelina River, Lufkin, Texas
- Coordinates: 31°27′25″N 94°43′34″W
- Area: less than one acre
- Built: 1935
- Built by: Russ Mitchell, Inc.
- Engineer: G.G. Wickline
- Architectural style: Span bridge
- MPS: Angelina County MRA
- NRHP reference No.: 88002801
- Added to NRHP: December 22, 1988

The Angelina River Bridge was a historic bridge on U.S. Route 59 (US 59) over the Angelina River in Lufkin, Texas. It was built in 1935 and added to the National Register of Historic Places in 1988.

It was a poured concrete bridge supported by concrete piers, poured in sections about 25 feet (7.6 m) long. It had square balusters and rails with chamfered edges.

The bridge was demolished and replaced with a new bridge in 1998.

== See also ==
- National Register of Historic Places listings in Angelina County, Texas
- List of bridges on the National Register of Historic Places in Texas
