= Woodmen of the World Lodge-Phoenix Camp No. 32 =

- Woodmen of the World Lodge--Phoenix Camp No. 32
- Formerly listed on the U.S. National Register of Historic Places
- Location within Texas Location within the United States
- Location: 110 Border St., Orange, Texas
- Coordinates: 30°5′21″N 93°44′15″W
- Area: less than one acre
- Built: 1915
- Architect: Nemits, Charles
- Architectural style: Mission Revival
- NRHP reference No.: 95001551

Significant dates
- Added to NRHP: January 19, 1996
- Removed from NRHP: November 17, 2010

The Woodmen of the World Lodge—Phoenix Camp No. 32, also known as Heritage Museum of Orange, was a building in Orange, Texas. It was built in 1915 and served historically as a meeting hall and as a specialty store. It was listed on the National Register of Historic Places in 1996.

The building suffered damage during Hurricane Rita in 2005, but was repaired within a year. It was again damaged in 2008 during Hurricane Ike. The damage was determined to be irreparable, and was demolished in June 2010.

The building was delisted from the National Register in November 2010.

== See also ==
- National Register of Historic Places listings in Orange County, Texas
