= National Register of Historic Places listings in Polk County, Texas =

Location of Polk County in Texas

This is a list of the National Register of Historic Places listings in Polk County, Texas.

This is intended to be a complete list of properties listed on the National Register of Historic Places in Polk County, Texas. There are two properties listed on the National Register in the county. One property contains State Antiquities Landmarks of which one is also a Recorded Texas Historic Landmark.

This National Park Service list is complete through NPS recent listings posted March 21, 2025.

== Current listings ==
The locations of National Register properties may be seen in a mapping service provided.

	Name on the Register	Image	Date listed	Location	City or town	Description
1	William Keenan and Nancy Elizabeth McCardell House	William Keenan and Nancy Elizabeth McCardell House	August 10, 2005 (#05000863)	705 N. Beatty; 30°42′49″N 94°56′24″W	Livingston	
2	Polk County Courthouse and 1905 Courthouse Annex	Polk County Courthouse and 1905 Courthouse Annex	February 2, 2001 (#01000060)	Washington at Church St. 30°42′38″N 94°56′01″W	Livingston	Includes State Antiquities Landmarks, Recorded Texas Historic Landmark

== See also ==
- National Register of Historic Places listings in Texas
- Recorded Texas Historic Landmarks in Polk County
