= Ezekiel Cullen House =

Historic house in Texas

- U.S. National Register of Historic Places
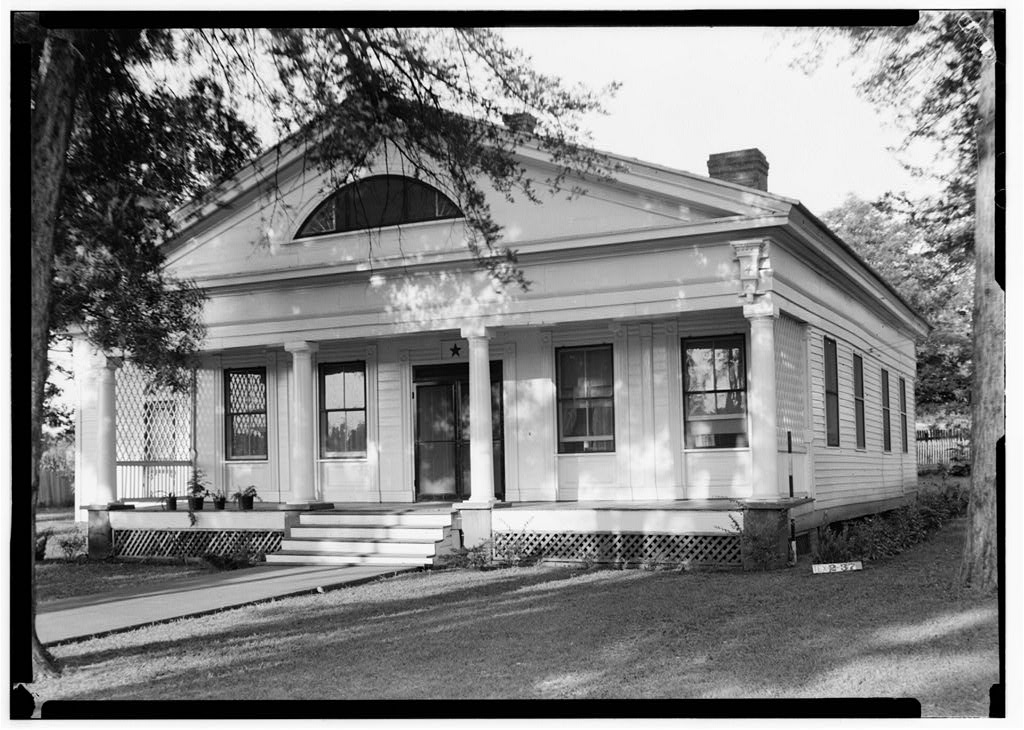
- Ezekiel Cullen House
- Location: San Augustine, Texas; United States
- Coordinates: 31°31′35″N 94°06′28″W
- Built: 1839
- Architect: Augustus Phelps
- Architectural style: Greek Revival
- NRHP reference No.: 71000960
- Added to NRHP: June 21, 1971

The Ezekiel Cullen House is a listed property on the National Register of Historic Places located in San Augustine, Texas. Augustus Phelps completed the structure in 1839 for Ezekiel Cullen. Hugh Roy Cullen contracted with Raiford Stripling to restore the house in 1952, and donated the property to the Ezekiel Cullen Chapter of the Daughters of the Republic of Texas.

== History ==
Ezekiel Cullen arrived in San Augustine from Georgia in 1835 and established a law practice in his new hometown. He commissioned Augustus Phelps to build a Greek Revival house near town in 1839.

== Architecture ==
The main plan of the house is single-story central hall flanked by three rooms on each side. The main entry features a pediment-type gable framed with an entablature and decorated with a fan window. The gable rests on an asymmetrical tetrastyle portico. The original house was ornamented with various arrangements of five-pointed stars. In the original design, Phelps added a fitted trellis to the east and west sides of the portico to enhance shade. Precision-fitting is also evident in the pediment moldings and fascia. Interior features exhibit the same level of craftsmanship. Local carpenters hand-planed pine moldings. A Phelps feature borrowed from other nineteenth-century designs was the five-panel door. Interior panels display precise wainscoting. Later additions to the house include its north wing and dormer windows.

== Restoration ==
Houston oilman Hugh Roy Cullen, a grandson of Ezekiel, hired Raiford Stripling to restore the house in 1952. To ensure the care and maintenance of the house, Cullen donated it to the Ezekiel Cullen Chapter of the Daughters of the Republic of Texas (DRT) in 1953. As of 2000, the local DAR chapter still owned and maintained the property.
