= Manning, Texas =

- Ghost town
- Location within Texas Location within the United States
- Coordinates: 31°08′20″N 94°32′11″W
- Country: United States
- State: Texas
- County: Angelina
- Elevation: 272 ft (83 m)
- Time zone: UTC-6 (Central (CST))
  - Summer (DST): UTC-5 (CDT)
- Area code: 936
- GNIS feature ID: 1382227

Manning is a ghost town in Angelina County, Texas in East Texas, United States. It is located within the Lufkin, Texas micropolitan area.

== History ==
The Gibbs-Flournoy House in the community is listed on the National Register of Historic Places.

== Geography ==
Manning was located in the bottomlands of the Neches River in southeastern Angelina County.

== Education ==
Manning had a school for white children with seven teachers employed and another school for black students with two teachers at its peak of prosperity. The schools closed when mill employees left the area. Today, the ghost town is located within the Huntington Independent School District.

== See also ==
- List of ghost towns in Texas
