= Woodmen of the World Building (Nacogdoches, Texas) =

- U.S. National Register of Historic Places
- U.S. Historic district – Contributing property
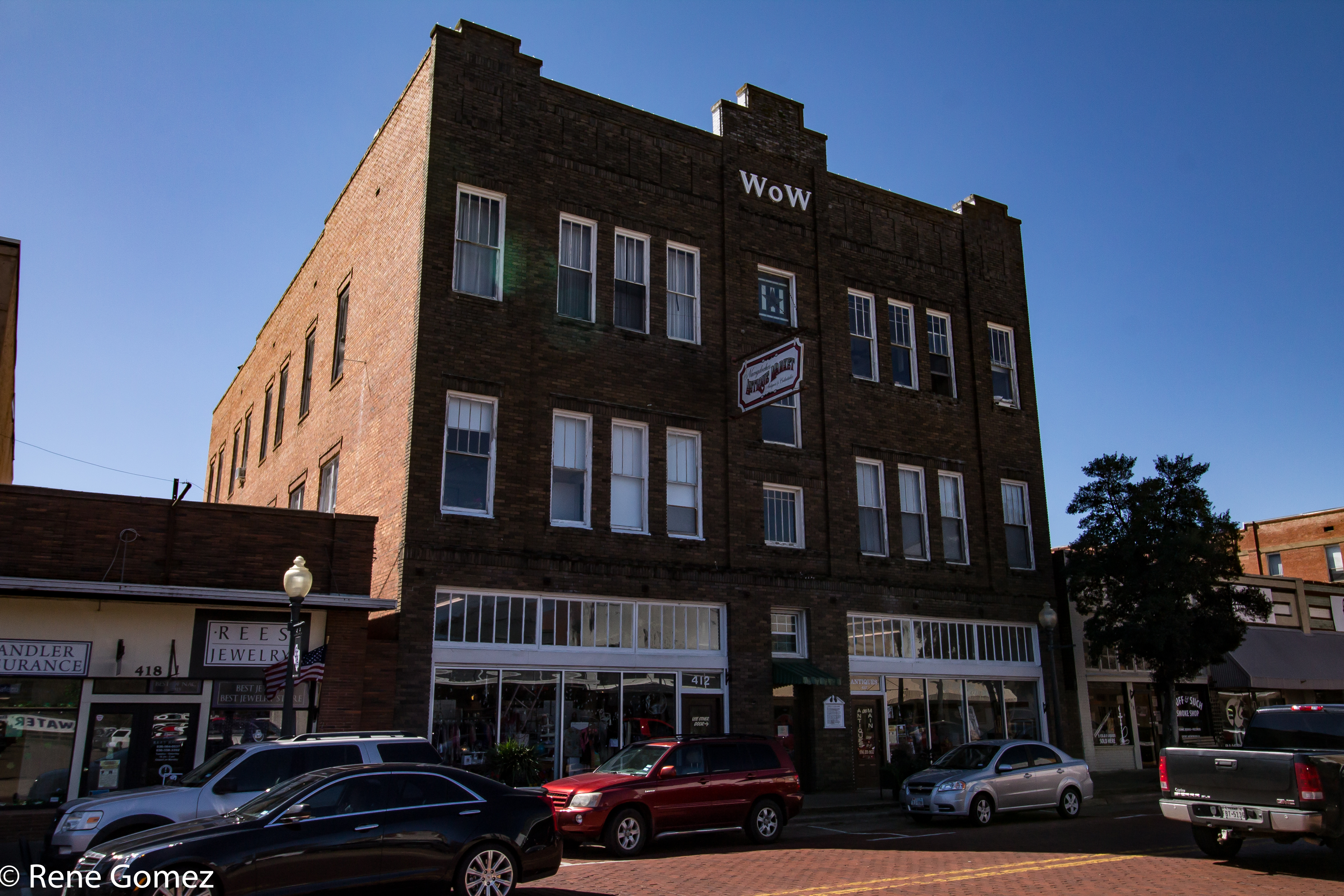
- Woodmen of the World Building in 2016

- Location within Texas Location within the United States
- Location: 412 E. Main St., Nacogdoches, Texas
- Coordinates: 31°36′8″N 94°39′13″W
- Area: less than one acre
- Built: 1923
- Built by: Moore Construction Co.
- Architectural style: Two-part commercial block
- Part of: Nacogdoches Downtown Historic District (ID08000478)
- MPS: Nacogdoches MPS
- NRHP reference No.: 92000012

Significant dates
- Added to NRHP: February 14, 1992
- Designated CP: May 29, 2008

The Woodmen of the World Building in Nacogdoches, Texas was built in 1923. It is a two-part commercial block building. Its third floor served historically as a meeting hall of the local Woodmen of the World chapter, which was organized in 1908, until 1975 when the chapter moved elsewhere. Its first and second floors were leased to businesses. It was listed on the National Register of Historic Places in 1992.

It is a three-story building constructed with load-bearing masonry walls. It was built at cost of $15,656.00 to contractor Moore Construction Co. for the structure and $10,000 to R. W. Parrish for woodwork. Its NRHP nomination asserts that it is an "outstanding" example of early 20th-century architecture in Nagodoches and that it "is most noted for its strong vertical expression. This is established by the use of 3-story piers on each comer and in the center bay that rise to a stepped parapet, and the vertical muntins found on all windows."

== See also ==
- National Register of Historic Places listings in Nacogdoches County, Texas
