= National Register of Historic Places listings in the West Texas region of Texas =

This is a list of the National Register of Historic Places listings in Texas's Northwest region.

The West Texas region is an area of 30 counties defined by the Texas Comptroller for economic reporting in 2022, as mapped here.

The region included 2020 population of 650,000, or 2 percent of Texas' population.

To see all locations together in a map, click on "Map all coordinates using OpenSourceMap" at right.

== Andrews County ==
	Name on the Register	Image	Date listed	Location	City or town	Description
1	Andrews Lake Sites		November 22, 1978 (#78002886)	Address restricted	Andrews	

== Borden County ==
(has no NRHP listings)

== Coke County ==
	Name on the Register	Image	Date listed	Location	City or town	Description
1	Coke County Jail	Coke County Jail	December 23, 2004 (#04001395)	6th at Chadbourne; 31°53′34″N 100°29′16″W	Robert Lee	
2	Fort Chadbourne	Fort Chadbourne	April 2, 1973 (#73001962)	Off US 277 near Runnels and Coke county line 32°02′07″N 100°14′48″W	Bronte	

== Concho County ==
	Name on the Register	Image	Date listed	Location	City or town	Description
1	Bishop Site	Bishop Site	June 17, 1977 (#77001434)	Address restricted	Salt Gap	
2	Concho County Courthouse	Concho County Courthouse	November 7, 1977 (#77001433)	Public Sq. 31°30′30″N 99°55′11″W	Paint Rock	State Antiquities Landmark, Recorded Texas Historic Landmark
3	Eola School	Eola School	December 22, 2005 (#05001458)	12119 FM 381; 31°24′08″N 100°05′19″W	Eola	
4	Paint Rock Indian Pictograph Site	Paint Rock Indian Pictograph Site	June 21, 1971 (#71000927)	Address restricted	Paint Rock	

== Crane County ==
(has no NRHP listings)

== Crockett County ==
	Name on the Register	Image	Date listed	Location	City or town	Description
1	Camp Melvin Site	Camp Melvin Site	November 15, 1978 (#78002909)	Address restricted	Iraan	
2	Ira and Wilma Carson House	Ira and Wilma Carson House	September 26, 2002 (#02001062)	1103 Avenue C 30°42′35″N 101°11′58″W	Ozona	
3	Crockett County Courthouse	Crockett County Courthouse	December 27, 1974 (#74002066)	907 Ave. D 30°42′39″N 101°12′02″W	Ozona	State Antiquities Landmark, Recorded Texas Historic Landmark
4	Fort Lancaster	Fort Lancaster	March 11, 1971 (#71000928)	10 mi. E of Sheffield on U.S. 290; 30°39′58″N 101°41′46″W	Sheffield	State Historic Site, State Antiquities Landmark
5	Harris Ranch Petroglyph Site 41 CX 110	Harris Ranch Petroglyph Site 41 CX 110	May 5, 1978 (#78002908)	Address restricted	Iraan	
6	Live Oak Creek Archeological District	Live Oak Creek Archeological District	April 2, 1976 (#76002018)	Address restricted	Sheffield	
7	Turkey Roost Petroglyph Site	Turkey Roost Petroglyph Site	October 19, 1978 (#78002910)	Address restricted	Ozona	

== Dawson County ==
	Name on the Register	Image	Date listed	Location	City or town	Description
1	Lamesa Farm Workers Community Historic District	Lamesa Farm Workers Community Historic District	August 9, 1993 (#93000771)	Approx 1 mile north of the junction of US 87 and US 180; 32°43′08″N 101°55′04″W	Los Ybanez	

== Ector County ==
	Name on the Register	Image	Date listed	Location	City or town	Description
1	White-Pool House	White-Pool House	January 8, 1980 (#80004099)	112 E. Murphy St. 31°50′31″N 102°21′52″W	Odessa	State Antiquities Landmark, Recorded Texas Historic Landmark

== Gaines County ==
(has no NRHP listings)

== Glasscock County ==
	Name on the Register	Image	Date listed	Location	City or town	Description
1	Glasscock County Courthouse and Jail	Glasscock County Courthouse and Jail	March 21, 2011 (#11000129)	117 E. Currie St. 31°51′49″N 101°28′49″W	Garden City	State Antiquities Landmark, Recorded Texas Historic Landmark

== Howard County ==
	Name on the Register	Image	Date listed	Location	City or town	Description
1	Big Spring Downtown Historic District		August 26, 2024 (#100009055)	Roughly bounded by 1st, Goliad, 6th, and South Gregg Sts. 32°15′11″N 101°28′31″W	Big Spring	
2	Big Spring Hospital	Big Spring Hospital	October 6, 2023 (#100009404)	810 Goliad St. 32°14′56″N 101°28′11″W	Big Spring	
3	Big Spring Veterans Administration Hospital	Big Spring Veterans Administration Hospital	October 24, 2022 (#100008282)	300 Veterans Blvd. 32°13′54″N 101°28′18″W	Big Spring	
4	Petroleum Building		April 21, 2021 (#100006397)	111 Scurry St. 32°15′12″N 101°28′42″W	Big Spring	
5	Potton-Hayden House	Potton-Hayden House	April 14, 1975 (#75001992)	SW corner Gregg and 2nd Sts. 32°15′00″N 101°28′42″W	Big Spring	State Antiquities Landmark, Recorded Texas Historic Landmark
6	Settles Hotel	Settles Hotel	April 16, 2013 (#13000207)	200 E. 3rd St. 32°15′10″N 101°28′31″W	Big Spring	Recorded Texas Historic Landmark

== Irion County ==
	Name on the Register	Image	Date listed	Location	City or town	Description
1	Irion County Courthouse	Irion County Courthouse	August 29, 1977 (#77001455)	Public Sq. 31°16′47″N 100°47′41″W	Sherwood	

== Kimble County ==
	Name on the Register	Image	Date listed	Location	City or town	Description
1	Brambletye	Brambletye	July 15, 1982 (#82004511)	Off SR 2291; 30°33′51″N 99°51′21″W	Junction	Recorded Texas Historic Landmark
2	Kimble County Courthouse	Kimble County Courthouse	August 12, 2021 (#100006858)	501 Main St. 30°29′20″N 99°45′57″W	Junction	
3	State Highway 27 Bridge at Johnson Fork	State Highway 27 Bridge at Johnson Fork	October 10, 1996 (#96001113)	I-10, .6 mi. W of jct. with FM 2169; 30°25′34″N 99°40′47″W	Junction	
4	State Highway 27 Bridge at the South Llano River	State Highway 27 Bridge at the South Llano River	October 10, 1996 (#96001124)	Loop 481, .2 mi. E of 6th St. 30°29′16″N 99°45′45″W	Junction	

== Loving County ==
	Name on the Register	Image	Date listed	Location	City or town	Description
1	Loving County Courthouse	Loving County Courthouse	May 10, 2006 (#06000362)	Bounded by Pecos St., Collins St., Dallas St., and TX 302; 31°42′23″N 103°35′55″W	Mentone	

== Martin County ==
	Name on the Register	Image	Date listed	Location	City or town	Description
1	Carmelite Monastery		November 3, 1999 (#99000566)	400 E. Carpenter St. 32°08′02″N 101°47′21″W	Stanton	Recorded Texas Historic Landmark

== Mason County ==
	Name on the Register	Image	Date listed	Location	City or town	Description
1	Heinrich and Fredericka Hasse House	Heinrich and Fredericka Hasse House	March 14, 1990 (#90000336)	TX 29, W of Art; 30°44′21″N 99°07′16″W	Art	
2	Mason Historic District	Mason Historic District	September 17, 1974 (#74002086)	Irregular pattern along both sides of U.S. 87 and TX 29; 30°44′56″N 99°13′27″W	Mason	Boundary increase on Oct. 16, 1991 (#91001526); includes State Antiquities Landmark and numerous Recorded Texas Historic Landmarks
3	Reynolds-Seaquist House	Reynolds-Seaquist House	November 20, 1974 (#74002087)	400 Broad St. 30°45′05″N 99°13′54″W	Mason	Recorded Texas Historic Landmark; part of Mason Historic District NRHP PDF
4	State Highway 9 Bridge at the Llano River	State Highway 9 Bridge at the Llano River	October 10, 1996 (#96001128)	US 87, 10 mi (16 km). S of TX 29; 30°39′40″N 99°06′34″W	Mason	Funded by the New Deal program under President Franklin Roosevelt

== McCulloch County ==
	Name on the Register	Image	Date listed	Location	City or town	Description
1	McCulloch County Courthouse	McCulloch County Courthouse	December 16, 1977 (#77001515)	Public Sq. 31°08′06″N 99°20′05″W	Brady	State Antiquities Landmark, Recorded Texas Historic Landmark
2	Old McCulloch County Jail	Old McCulloch County Jail	April 3, 1975 (#75002073)	117 N. High St. 31°08′07″N 99°20′12″W	Brady	Recorded Texas Historic Landmark

== Menard County ==
	Name on the Register	Image	Date listed	Location	City or town	Description
1	Fort McKavett Historic District	Fort McKavett Historic District	July 14, 1971 (#71000955)	S bank of the San Saba River; 30°49′43″N 100°06′27″W	Fort McKavett	Texas State Historic Site, includes Recorded Texas Historic Landmark
2	Menard County Courthouse	Menard County Courthouse	September 12, 2003 (#03000935)	206 E. San Saba St. 30°54′55″N 99°47′02″W	Menard	State Antiquities Landmark, Recorded Texas Historic Landmark
3	Site of Presidio San Luis de las Amarillas	Site of Presidio San Luis de las Amarillas	August 25, 1972 (#72001369)	1 mile west of Menard; 30°55′21″N 99°48′06″W	Menard	State Antiquities Landmark

== Midland County ==
	Name on the Register	Image	Date listed	Location	City or town	Description
1	Brown-Dorsey House	Brown-Dorsey House	June 17, 1982 (#82004516)	213 N. Weatherford; 31°59′55″N 102°04′19″W	Midland	Recorded Texas Historic Landmark
2	George W. Bush Childhood Home	George W. Bush Childhood Home	July 28, 2004 (#04000768)	1412 W. Ohio; 32°00′02″N 102°05′24″W	Midland	Recorded Texas Historic Landmark
3	Midland Tower	Midland Tower	January 27, 2015 (#14001228)	223 West Wall Street; 31°59′50″N 102°04′36″W	Midland	
4	Fred and Juliette Turner House	Fred and Juliette Turner House	August 15, 1988 (#88001148)	1705 W. Missouri; 31°59′36″N 102°05′29″W	Midland	
5	Vaughn Building	Vaughn Building	June 7, 2016 (#16000352)	400 W. Texas Ave. 31°59′55″N 102°04′42″W	Midland	

== Pecos County ==
	Name on the Register	Image	Date listed	Location	City or town	Description
1	Canon Ranch Archeological District	Canon Ranch Archeological District	August 11, 1982 (#82004519)	Address restricted	Sheffield	
2	Canon Ranch Railroad Eclipse Windmill	Canon Ranch Railroad Eclipse Windmill	September 22, 1977 (#77001465)	West of Sheffield on Canon Ranch; 30°44′44″N 101°58′30″W	Sheffield	
3	Fort Stockton Historic District	Fort Stockton Historic District	April 2, 1973 (#73001971)	E edge of town 30°53′15″N 102°52′32″W	Fort Stockton	Contains Recorded Texas Historic Landmarks

== Reagan County ==
	Name on the Register	Image	Date listed	Location	City or town	Description
1	Old Reagan County Courthouse	Old Reagan County Courthouse	May 5, 1978 (#78002976)	Off SH 137; 31°24′23″N 101°33′56″W	Stiles	State Antiquities Landmark, Recorded Texas Historic Landmark

== Reeves County ==
(has no NRHP listings)

== Schleicher County ==
	Name on the Register	Image	Date listed	Location	City or town	Description
1	Mittel Site	Mittel Site	January 4, 1990 (#89002278)	Address restricted	Eldorado	Smithsonian trinomial 41SL15

== Sterling County ==
	Name on the Register	Image	Date listed	Location	City or town	Description
1	Sterling City Gulf, Colorado & Santa Fe Railway Passenger Depot	Sterling City Gulf, Colorado & Santa Fe Railway Passenger Depot	October 21, 2020 (#100005690)	415 Stadium Ave. 31°50′32″N 100°59′04″W	Sterling City	

== Sutton County ==
	Name on the Register	Image	Date listed	Location	City or town	Description
1	deBerry Ranch		February 21, 2011 (#11000134)	Private Rd. 1105, approximately 1.5 miles east of County Road 108; 30°37′33″N 100°41′31″W	Sonora vicinity	
2	Old Mercantile Building	Old Mercantile Building	January 30, 1978 (#78002979)	222 Main St. 30°34′18″N 100°38′40″W	Sonora	Recorded Texas Historic Landmark
3	Sutton County Courthouse	Sutton County Courthouse	July 15, 1977 (#77001476)	Public Sq. 30°34′20″N 100°38′37″W	Sonora	State Antiquities Landmark, Recorded Texas Historic Landmark

== Terrell County ==
	Name on the Register	Image	Date listed	Location	City or town	Description
1	Bullis' Camp Site	Bullis' Camp Site	August 2, 1978 (#78002985)	Address restricted	Dryden	
2	Geddis Canyon Rock Art Site	Geddis Canyon Rock Art Site	May 22, 1978 (#78002986)	Address restricted	Dryden	
3	Meyers Springs Pictograph Site	Meyers Springs Pictograph Site	September 14, 1972 (#72001373)	Address restricted	Dryden	
4	Wroe Ranch Shelter No. 1	Wroe Ranch Shelter No. 1	January 4, 1990 (#89002279)	Address restricted	Sheffield	

== Tom Green County ==
	Name on the Register	Image	Date listed	Location	City or town	Description
1	Angelo Heights Historic District	Angelo Heights Historic District	November 25, 1988 (#88002605)	Roughly bounded by Colorado St., the Concho River, Live Oak St., S. Bishop St., Twohig St., and S. Washington St. 31°27′18″N 100°27′21″W	San Angelo	San Angelo Multiple Resource Area (MRA)
2	Aztec Cleaners and Laundry Building	Aztec Cleaners and Laundry Building	November 25, 1988 (#88002577)	119 S. Irving; 31°27′39″N 100°26′17″W	San Angelo	San Angelo MRA
3	Frederick Beck Farm	Frederick Beck Farm	November 25, 1988 (#88002566)	1231 Culberson; 31°27′44″N 100°25′03″W	San Angelo	Recorded Texas Historic Landmark, San Angelo MRA
4	J. B. Blakeney House	J. B. Blakeney House	November 25, 1988 (#88002600)	438 W. Twohig; 31°27′32″N 100°26′42″W	San Angelo	House completed in 1929, designed by Anton Korn, included in San Angelo MRA.
5	C. A. Broome House	C. A. Broome House	November 25, 1988 (#88002567)	123 S. David; 31°27′31″N 100°26′43″W	San Angelo	San Angelo MRA
6	R. Wilbur Brown House	R. Wilbur Brown House	November 25, 1988 (#88002585)	1004 Pecos; 31°27′34″N 100°27′08″W	San Angelo	San Angelo MRA
7	Building at 113–119 East Concho	Building at 113–119 East Concho	September 13, 1990 (#88002564)	113–119 E. Concho; 31°27′38″N 100°25′57″W	San Angelo	San Angelo MRA
8	Clayton House	Clayton House	November 25, 1988 (#88002570)	1101 S. David; 31°27′01″N 100°26′36″W	San Angelo	San Angelo MRA
9	Collyns House	Collyns House	November 25, 1988 (#88002597)	315 W. Twohig; 31°27′32″N 100°26′32″W	San Angelo	San Angelo MRA
10	Develin House	Develin House	November 25, 1988 (#88002568)	913 S. David; 31°27′07″N 100°26′36″W	San Angelo	San Angelo MRA
11	Eckert House	Eckert House	November 25, 1988 (#88002578)	503 Koberlin; 31°28′04″N 100°25′42″W	San Angelo	San Angelo MRA
12	Emmanuel Episcopal Church	Emmanuel Episcopal Church	November 25, 1988 (#88002590)	3 S. Randolph; 31°27′44″N 100°26′27″W	San Angelo	Recorded Texas Historic Landmark, San Angelo MRA
13	First Presbyterian Church	First Presbyterian Church	November 25, 1988 (#88002604)	32 N. Irving; 31°27′52″N 100°26′21″W	San Angelo	San Angelo MRA
14	O. C. Fisher Federal Building	O. C. Fisher Federal Building	November 25, 1988 (#88002592)	33 E. Twohig; 31°27′42″N 100°26′04″W	San Angelo	San Angelo MRA
15	Fort Concho Historic District	Fort Concho Historic District	October 15, 1966 (#66000823)	South edge of downtown San Angelo; 31°27′10″N 100°25′45″W	San Angelo	State Antiquities Landmark; includes multiple Recorded Texas Historic Landmarks
16	Freeze Building	Freeze Building	June 20, 1997 (#97000615)	18 W. Concho Ave. 31°27′36″N 100°26′11″W	San Angelo	
17	Greater St. Paul AME Church	Greater St. Paul AME Church	November 25, 1988 (#88002548)	215 W. 3rd St. 31°27′57″N 100°26′32″W	San Angelo	San Angelo MRA
18	Hagelstein Commercial Building	Hagelstein Commercial Building	November 25, 1988 (#88002560)	616–620 S. Chadbourne; 31°27′17″N 100°26′04″W	San Angelo	San Angelo MRA
19	R. A. Hall House	R. A. Hall House	November 25, 1988 (#88002595)	215 W. Twohig; 31°27′34″N 100°26′24″W	San Angelo	San Angelo MRA
20	Harris Drug Store	Harris Drug Store	June 14, 2001 (#01000665)	114 S. Chadbourne St. 31°27′43″N 100°26′11″W	San Angelo	
21	S. L. Henderson House	S. L. Henderson House	November 25, 1988 (#88002583)	1303 S. Park; 31°26′54″N 100°26′50″W	San Angelo	San Angelo MRA
22	Hilton Hotel	Hilton Hotel	September 20, 1984 (#84001999)	36 E. Twohig St. 31°27′43″N 100°26′05″W	San Angelo	
23	Holcomb-Blanton Print Shop		November 25, 1988 (#88002554)	24 W. Beauregard; 31°27′44″N 100°26′17″W	San Angelo	San Angelo MRA. Demolished.
24	House at 1017 South David	House at 1017 South David	November 25, 1988 (#88002569)	1017 S. David; 31°27′04″N 100°26′36″W	San Angelo	San Angelo MRA
25	House at 123 Allen	House at 123 Allen	November 25, 1988 (#88002601)	123 Allen; 31°27′31″N 100°25′52″W	San Angelo	San Angelo MRA
26	House at 1325 South David	House at 1325 South David	November 25, 1988 (#88002571)	1325 S. David; 31°26′51″N 100°26′36″W	San Angelo	San Angelo MRA
27	House at 140 Allen	House at 140 Allen	November 25, 1988 (#88002550)	140 Allen; 31°27′33″N 100°25′51″W	San Angelo	San Angelo MRA
28	House at 1621 North Chadbourne	House at 1621 North Chadbourne	November 25, 1988 (#88002559)	1621 N. Chadbourne; 31°28′38″N 100°26′48″W	San Angelo	San Angelo MRA
29	House at 221 North Magdalen	House at 221 North Magdalen	November 25, 1988 (#88002579)	221 N. Magdalen; 31°28′04″N 100°26′06″W	San Angelo	San Angelo MRA
30	House at 405 Preusser	House at 405 Preusser	November 25, 1988 (#88002586)	405 Preusser; 31°27′58″N 100°25′47″W	San Angelo	San Angelo MRA
31	House at 419 West Avenue C		November 25, 1988 (#88002544)	419 West Ave. C 31°27′15″N 100°26′27″W	San Angelo	San Angelo MRA
32	House at 421 West Twohig	House at 421 West Twohig	November 25, 1988 (#88002598)	421 W. Twohig; 31°27′30″N 100°26′37″W	San Angelo	San Angelo MRA
33	House at 427 West Twohig	House at 427 West Twohig	September 13, 1990 (#88002599)	427 W. Twohig; 31°27′30″N 100°26′40″W	San Angelo	San Angelo MRA
34	House at 521 West Highland Boulevard	House at 521 West Highland Boulevard	November 25, 1988 (#88002575)	521 W. Highland Blvd. 31°27′05″N 100°26′35″W	San Angelo	San Angelo MRA
35	House at 715 Austin	House at 715 Austin	November 25, 1988 (#88002551)	715 Austin; 31°27′14″N 100°26′42″W	San Angelo	San Angelo MRA
36	House at 731 Preusser	House at 731 Preusser	November 25, 1988 (#88002589)	731 Preusser; 31°27′58″N 100°25′27″W	San Angelo	San Angelo MRA
37	Household Furniture Co.	Household Furniture Co.	November 25, 1988 (#88002558)	11 N. Chadbourne; 31°27′51″N 100°26′16″W	San Angelo	San Angelo MRA
38	Iglesia Santa Maria	Iglesia Santa Maria	November 25, 1988 (#88002547)	7 West Ave. N 31°26′33″N 100°26′04″W	San Angelo	San Angelo MRA
39	Lone Wolf Crossing Bridge	Lone Wolf Crossing Bridge	November 25, 1988 (#88002546)	Ave. K extension, E of Oakes; 31°26′45″N 100°25′30″W	San Angelo	San Angelo MRA
40	Mason-Hughes House	Mason-Hughes House	November 25, 1988 (#88002557)	1104 W. Beauregard; 31°27′27″N 100°27′08″W	San Angelo	San Angelo MRA
41	Masonic Lodge 570	Masonic Lodge 570	November 25, 1988 (#88002580)	130 S. Oakes; 31°27′44″N 100°26′03″W	San Angelo	San Angelo MRA
42	J. T. and Minnie McClelland House	J. T. and Minnie McClelland House	November 25, 1988 (#88002576)	715 W. Highland; 31°27′05″N 100°26′42″W	San Angelo	San Angelo MRA
43	Monogram Square	Monogram Square	November 25, 1988 (#88002602)	305 W. Concho; 31°27′28″N 100°26′28″W	San Angelo	San Angelo MRA
44	Montgomery Ward Building		November 25, 1988 (#88002553)	10 W. Beauregard; 31°27′45″N 100°26′13″W	San Angelo	San Angelo MRA
45	Municipal Swimming Pool	Municipal Swimming Pool	November 25, 1988 (#88002543)	18 East Ave. A 31°27′24″N 100°25′59″W	San Angelo	Recorded Texas Historic Landmark, San Angelo MRA
46	Murrah House	Murrah House	November 25, 1988 (#88002594)	212 W. Twohig; 31°27′37″N 100°26′24″W	San Angelo	San Angelo MRA
47	Oakes Hotel Building	Oakes Hotel Building	November 25, 1988 (#88002581)	204 S. Oakes; 31°27′42″N 100°26′03″W	San Angelo	San Angelo MRA
48	Princess Ice Cream Co.	Princess Ice Cream Co.	November 25, 1988 (#88002556)	217 W. Beauregard; 31°27′39″N 100°26′26″W	San Angelo	San Angelo MRA
49	J. J. Rackley Building	J. J. Rackley Building	June 30, 1983 (#83003163)	118 S. Chadbourne; 31°27′42″N 100°26′10″W	San Angelo	
50	Roosevelt Hotel	Roosevelt Hotel	May 14, 2018 (#100002436)	50 N Chadbourne St. 31°27′55″N 100°26′15″W	San Angelo	
51	San Angelo City Hall	San Angelo City Hall	November 25, 1988 (#88002563)	City Hall Plaza; 31°27′53″N 100°26′21″W	San Angelo	San Angelo MRA
52	San Angelo National Bank Building	San Angelo National Bank Building	December 16, 1982 (#82001740)	201 S. Chadbourne St. 31°27′40″N 100°26′11″W	San Angelo	Bank designed by Anton Korn and built in 1927.
53	San Angelo National Bank, Johnson and Taylor, and Schwartz and Raas Buildings	San Angelo National Bank, Johnson and Taylor, and Schwartz and Raas Buildings	April 7, 1978 (#78002988)	20–22, 24, 26 E. Concho Ave. 31°27′38″N 100°26′03″W	San Angelo	Recorded Texas Historic Landmark
54	San Angelo Telephone Company Building	San Angelo Telephone Company Building	November 25, 1988 (#88002593)	14 W. Twohig; 31°27′41″N 100°26′11″W	San Angelo	San Angelo MRA
55	Santa Fe Passenger Depot	Santa Fe Passenger Depot	November 27, 1989 (#88002561)	700 S. Chadbourne; 31°27′14″N 100°26′05″W	San Angelo	Recorded Texas Historic Landmark, San Angelo MRA
56	Santa Fe Railway Freight Depot	Santa Fe Railway Freight Depot	November 27, 1989 (#88002562)	700 S. Chadbourne; 31°27′16″N 100°26′02″W	San Angelo	Recorded Texas Historic Landmark, San Angelo MRA
57	William Schneemann House	William Schneemann House	November 25, 1988 (#88002588)	724 Preusser St. 31°28′01″N 100°25′28″W	San Angelo	San Angelo MRA
58	Shepperson House	Shepperson House	November 25, 1988 (#88002587)	716 Preusser; 31°28′01″N 100°25′33″W	San Angelo	San Angelo MRA
59	Texas Highway Department Building, Warehouse and Motor Vehicle Division	Texas Highway Department Building, Warehouse and Motor Vehicle Division	November 25, 1988 (#88002582)	100 Paint Rock Rd. 31°26′42″N 100°25′08″W	San Angelo	San Angelo MRA
60	Tom Green County Courthouse	Tom Green County Courthouse	November 25, 1988 (#88002555)	100 W. Beauregard; 31°27′45″N 100°26′22″W	San Angelo	San Angelo MRA
61	Tom Green County Jail	Tom Green County Jail	October 22, 1976 (#76002246)	US 67; 31°27′47″N 100°26′22″W	San Angelo	Demolished in 1977
62	Twin Mountain Fence Company		October 6, 2023 (#100009406)	7513 South US 67; 31°24′46″N 100°32′37″W	San Angelo vicinity	
63	C. C. Walsh House	C. C. Walsh House	September 13, 1990 (#88002584)	922 Pecos; 31°27′36″N 100°27′06″W	San Angelo	San Angelo MRA
64	Dr. Herbert A. Wardlaw House	Dr. Herbert A. Wardlaw House	November 25, 1988 (#88002596)	233 W. Twohig; 31°27′32″N 100°26′31″W	San Angelo	San Angelo MRA
65	West Texas Utilities Office	West Texas Utilities Office	November 25, 1988 (#88002552)	15 E. Beauregard; 31°27′45″N 100°26′08″W	San Angelo	San Angelo MRA
66	John C. Westbrook House		November 25, 1988 (#88002545)	600 West Ave. C 31°27′17″N 100°26′17″W	San Angelo	San Angelo MRA
67	John and Anton Willeke House	John and Anton Willeke House	November 25, 1988 (#88002573)	941 E. Harris; 31°27′53″N 100°25′17″W	San Angelo	San Angelo MRA
68	John Willeke Jr. House	John Willeke Jr. House	November 25, 1988 (#88002574)	1005 E. Harris; 31°27′54″N 100°25′16″W	San Angelo	San Angelo MRA
69	John Willeke Sr. House	John Willeke Sr. House	November 25, 1988 (#88002572)	931 E. Harris; 31°27′54″N 100°25′18″W	San Angelo	San Angelo MRA
70	Dr. M. M. Woodward House	Dr. M. M. Woodward House	November 25, 1988 (#88002549)	44 W. 25th St. 31°29′05″N 100°27′12″W	San Angelo	San Angelo MRA

== Upton County ==
(has no NRHP listings)

== Ward County ==
(has no NRHP listings)

== Winkler County ==
	Name on the Register	Image	Date listed	Location	City or town	Description
1	Rig Theater	Rig Theater	August 14, 2003 (#03000770)	213-215 E. Hendricks Blvd. 31°45′21″N 103°09′25″W	Wink	
