= National Register of Historic Places listings in Tom Green County, Texas =

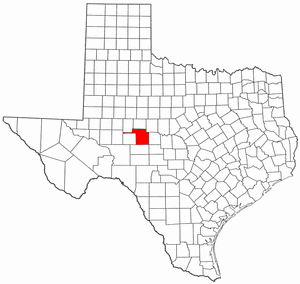
Location of Tom Green County in Texas

The following properties are listed on the National Register of Historic Places in Tom Green County, Texas.

This is intended to be a complete list of properties and districts listed on the National Register of Historic Places in Tom Green County, Texas. The county hosts two districts, one of which is a National Historic Landmark (NHL), and 68 individually listed properties. The NHL district is also a State Antiquities Landmark and contains numerous Recorded Texas Historic Landmarks (RTHL). Six additional National Register properties are also RTHLs. An additional property has been removed from the National Register.

This National Park Service list is complete through NPS recent listings posted March 21, 2025.

== Current listings ==
The locations of National Register properties and districts may be seen in a mapping service provided.

	Name on the Register	Image	Date listed	Location	City or town	Description
1	Angelo Heights Historic District	Angelo Heights Historic District	November 25, 1988 (#88002605)	Roughly bounded by Colorado St., the Concho River, Live Oak St., S. Bishop St., Twohig St., and S. Washington St. 31°27′18″N 100°27′21″W	San Angelo	San Angelo Multiple Resource Area (MRA)
2	Aztec Cleaners and Laundry Building	Aztec Cleaners and Laundry Building	November 25, 1988 (#88002577)	119 S. Irving; 31°27′39″N 100°26′17″W	San Angelo	San Angelo MRA
3	Frederick Beck Farm	Frederick Beck Farm	November 25, 1988 (#88002566)	1231 Culberson; 31°27′44″N 100°25′03″W	San Angelo	Recorded Texas Historic Landmark, San Angelo MRA
4	J. B. Blakeney House	J. B. Blakeney House	November 25, 1988 (#88002600)	438 W. Twohig; 31°27′32″N 100°26′42″W	San Angelo	House completed in 1929, designed by Anton Korn, included in San Angelo MRA.
5	C. A. Broome House	C. A. Broome House	November 25, 1988 (#88002567)	123 S. David; 31°27′31″N 100°26′43″W	San Angelo	San Angelo MRA
6	R. Wilbur Brown House	R. Wilbur Brown House	November 25, 1988 (#88002585)	1004 Pecos; 31°27′34″N 100°27′08″W	San Angelo	San Angelo MRA
7	Building at 113–119 East Concho	Building at 113–119 East Concho	September 13, 1990 (#88002564)	113–119 E. Concho; 31°27′38″N 100°25′57″W	San Angelo	San Angelo MRA
8	Clayton House	Clayton House	November 25, 1988 (#88002570)	1101 S. David; 31°27′01″N 100°26′36″W	San Angelo	San Angelo MRA
9	Collyns House	Collyns House	November 25, 1988 (#88002597)	315 W. Twohig; 31°27′32″N 100°26′32″W	San Angelo	San Angelo MRA
10	Develin House	Develin House	November 25, 1988 (#88002568)	913 S. David; 31°27′07″N 100°26′36″W	San Angelo	San Angelo MRA
11	Eckert House	Eckert House	November 25, 1988 (#88002578)	503 Koberlin; 31°28′04″N 100°25′42″W	San Angelo	San Angelo MRA
12	Emmanuel Episcopal Church	Emmanuel Episcopal Church	November 25, 1988 (#88002590)	3 S. Randolph; 31°27′44″N 100°26′27″W	San Angelo	Recorded Texas Historic Landmark, San Angelo MRA
13	First Presbyterian Church	First Presbyterian Church	November 25, 1988 (#88002604)	32 N. Irving; 31°27′52″N 100°26′21″W	San Angelo	San Angelo MRA
14	O. C. Fisher Federal Building	O. C. Fisher Federal Building	November 25, 1988 (#88002592)	33 E. Twohig; 31°27′42″N 100°26′04″W	San Angelo	San Angelo MRA
15	Fort Concho Historic District	Fort Concho Historic District	October 15, 1966 (#66000823)	South edge of downtown San Angelo; 31°27′10″N 100°25′45″W	San Angelo	State Antiquities Landmark; includes multiple Recorded Texas Historic Landmarks
16	Freeze Building	Freeze Building	June 20, 1997 (#97000615)	18 W. Concho Ave. 31°27′36″N 100°26′11″W	San Angelo	
17	Greater St. Paul AME Church	Greater St. Paul AME Church	November 25, 1988 (#88002548)	215 W. 3rd St. 31°27′57″N 100°26′32″W	San Angelo	San Angelo MRA
18	Hagelstein Commercial Building	Hagelstein Commercial Building	November 25, 1988 (#88002560)	616–620 S. Chadbourne; 31°27′17″N 100°26′04″W	San Angelo	San Angelo MRA
19	R. A. Hall House	R. A. Hall House	November 25, 1988 (#88002595)	215 W. Twohig; 31°27′34″N 100°26′24″W	San Angelo	San Angelo MRA
20	Harris Drug Store	Harris Drug Store	June 14, 2001 (#01000665)	114 S. Chadbourne St. 31°27′43″N 100°26′11″W	San Angelo	
21	S. L. Henderson House	S. L. Henderson House	November 25, 1988 (#88002583)	1303 S. Park; 31°26′54″N 100°26′50″W	San Angelo	San Angelo MRA
22	Hilton Hotel	Hilton Hotel	September 20, 1984 (#84001999)	36 E. Twohig St. 31°27′43″N 100°26′05″W	San Angelo	
23	Holcomb-Blanton Print Shop		November 25, 1988 (#88002554)	24 W. Beauregard; 31°27′44″N 100°26′17″W	San Angelo	San Angelo MRA. Demolished.
24	House at 1017 South David	House at 1017 South David	November 25, 1988 (#88002569)	1017 S. David; 31°27′04″N 100°26′36″W	San Angelo	San Angelo MRA
25	House at 123 Allen	House at 123 Allen	November 25, 1988 (#88002601)	123 Allen; 31°27′31″N 100°25′52″W	San Angelo	San Angelo MRA
26	House at 1325 South David	House at 1325 South David	November 25, 1988 (#88002571)	1325 S. David; 31°26′51″N 100°26′36″W	San Angelo	San Angelo MRA
27	House at 140 Allen	House at 140 Allen	November 25, 1988 (#88002550)	140 Allen; 31°27′33″N 100°25′51″W	San Angelo	San Angelo MRA
28	House at 1621 North Chadbourne	House at 1621 North Chadbourne	November 25, 1988 (#88002559)	1621 N. Chadbourne; 31°28′38″N 100°26′48″W	San Angelo	San Angelo MRA
29	House at 221 North Magdalen	House at 221 North Magdalen	November 25, 1988 (#88002579)	221 N. Magdalen; 31°28′04″N 100°26′06″W	San Angelo	San Angelo MRA
30	House at 405 Preusser	House at 405 Preusser	November 25, 1988 (#88002586)	405 Preusser; 31°27′58″N 100°25′47″W	San Angelo	San Angelo MRA
31	House at 419 West Avenue C		November 25, 1988 (#88002544)	419 West Ave. C 31°27′15″N 100°26′27″W	San Angelo	San Angelo MRA
32	House at 421 West Twohig	House at 421 West Twohig	November 25, 1988 (#88002598)	421 W. Twohig; 31°27′30″N 100°26′37″W	San Angelo	San Angelo MRA
33	House at 427 West Twohig	House at 427 West Twohig	September 13, 1990 (#88002599)	427 W. Twohig; 31°27′30″N 100°26′40″W	San Angelo	San Angelo MRA
34	House at 521 West Highland Boulevard	House at 521 West Highland Boulevard	November 25, 1988 (#88002575)	521 W. Highland Blvd. 31°27′05″N 100°26′35″W	San Angelo	San Angelo MRA
35	House at 715 Austin	House at 715 Austin	November 25, 1988 (#88002551)	715 Austin; 31°27′14″N 100°26′42″W	San Angelo	San Angelo MRA
36	House at 731 Preusser	House at 731 Preusser	November 25, 1988 (#88002589)	731 Preusser; 31°27′58″N 100°25′27″W	San Angelo	San Angelo MRA
37	Household Furniture Co.	Household Furniture Co.	November 25, 1988 (#88002558)	11 N. Chadbourne; 31°27′51″N 100°26′16″W	San Angelo	San Angelo MRA
38	Iglesia Santa Maria	Iglesia Santa Maria	November 25, 1988 (#88002547)	7 West Ave. N 31°26′33″N 100°26′04″W	San Angelo	San Angelo MRA
39	Lone Wolf Crossing Bridge	Lone Wolf Crossing Bridge	November 25, 1988 (#88002546)	Ave. K extension, E of Oakes; 31°26′45″N 100°25′30″W	San Angelo	San Angelo MRA
40	Mason-Hughes House	Mason-Hughes House	November 25, 1988 (#88002557)	1104 W. Beauregard; 31°27′27″N 100°27′08″W	San Angelo	San Angelo MRA
41	Masonic Lodge 570	Masonic Lodge 570	November 25, 1988 (#88002580)	130 S. Oakes; 31°27′44″N 100°26′03″W	San Angelo	San Angelo MRA
42	J. T. and Minnie McClelland House	J. T. and Minnie McClelland House	November 25, 1988 (#88002576)	715 W. Highland; 31°27′05″N 100°26′42″W	San Angelo	San Angelo MRA
43	Monogram Square	Monogram Square	November 25, 1988 (#88002602)	305 W. Concho; 31°27′28″N 100°26′28″W	San Angelo	San Angelo MRA
44	Montgomery Ward Building		November 25, 1988 (#88002553)	10 W. Beauregard; 31°27′45″N 100°26′13″W	San Angelo	San Angelo MRA
45	Municipal Swimming Pool	Municipal Swimming Pool	November 25, 1988 (#88002543)	18 East Ave. A 31°27′24″N 100°25′59″W	San Angelo	Recorded Texas Historic Landmark, San Angelo MRA
46	Murrah House	Murrah House	November 25, 1988 (#88002594)	212 W. Twohig; 31°27′37″N 100°26′24″W	San Angelo	San Angelo MRA
47	Oakes Hotel Building	Oakes Hotel Building	November 25, 1988 (#88002581)	204 S. Oakes; 31°27′42″N 100°26′03″W	San Angelo	San Angelo MRA
48	Princess Ice Cream Co.	Princess Ice Cream Co.	November 25, 1988 (#88002556)	217 W. Beauregard; 31°27′39″N 100°26′26″W	San Angelo	San Angelo MRA
49	J. J. Rackley Building	J. J. Rackley Building	June 30, 1983 (#83003163)	118 S. Chadbourne; 31°27′42″N 100°26′10″W	San Angelo	
50	Roosevelt Hotel	Roosevelt Hotel	May 14, 2018 (#100002436)	50 N Chadbourne St. 31°27′55″N 100°26′15″W	San Angelo	
51	San Angelo City Hall	San Angelo City Hall	November 25, 1988 (#88002563)	City Hall Plaza; 31°27′53″N 100°26′21″W	San Angelo	San Angelo MRA
52	San Angelo National Bank Building	San Angelo National Bank Building	December 16, 1982 (#82001740)	201 S. Chadbourne St. 31°27′40″N 100°26′11″W	San Angelo	Bank designed by Anton Korn and built in 1927.
53	San Angelo National Bank, Johnson and Taylor, and Schwartz and Raas Buildings	San Angelo National Bank, Johnson and Taylor, and Schwartz and Raas Buildings	April 7, 1978 (#78002988)	20–22, 24, 26 E. Concho Ave. 31°27′38″N 100°26′03″W	San Angelo	Recorded Texas Historic Landmark
54	San Angelo Telephone Company Building	San Angelo Telephone Company Building	November 25, 1988 (#88002593)	14 W. Twohig; 31°27′41″N 100°26′11″W	San Angelo	San Angelo MRA
55	Santa Fe Passenger Depot	Santa Fe Passenger Depot	November 27, 1989 (#88002561)	700 S. Chadbourne; 31°27′14″N 100°26′05″W	San Angelo	Recorded Texas Historic Landmark, San Angelo MRA
56	Santa Fe Railway Freight Depot	Santa Fe Railway Freight Depot	November 27, 1989 (#88002562)	700 S. Chadbourne; 31°27′16″N 100°26′02″W	San Angelo	Recorded Texas Historic Landmark, San Angelo MRA
57	William Schneemann House	William Schneemann House	November 25, 1988 (#88002588)	724 Preusser St. 31°28′01″N 100°25′28″W	San Angelo	San Angelo MRA
58	Shepperson House	Shepperson House	November 25, 1988 (#88002587)	716 Preusser; 31°28′01″N 100°25′33″W	San Angelo	San Angelo MRA
59	Texas Highway Department Building, Warehouse and Motor Vehicle Division	Texas Highway Department Building, Warehouse and Motor Vehicle Division	November 25, 1988 (#88002582)	100 Paint Rock Rd. 31°26′42″N 100°25′08″W	San Angelo	San Angelo MRA
60	Tom Green County Courthouse	Tom Green County Courthouse	November 25, 1988 (#88002555)	100 W. Beauregard; 31°27′45″N 100°26′22″W	San Angelo	San Angelo MRA
61	Tom Green County Jail	Tom Green County Jail	October 22, 1976 (#76002246)	US 67; 31°27′47″N 100°26′22″W	San Angelo	Demolished in 1977
62	Twin Mountain Fence Company		October 6, 2023 (#100009406)	7513 South US 67; 31°24′46″N 100°32′37″W	San Angelo vicinity	
63	C. C. Walsh House	C. C. Walsh House	September 13, 1990 (#88002584)	922 Pecos; 31°27′36″N 100°27′06″W	San Angelo	San Angelo MRA
64	Dr. Herbert A. Wardlaw House	Dr. Herbert A. Wardlaw House	November 25, 1988 (#88002596)	233 W. Twohig; 31°27′32″N 100°26′31″W	San Angelo	San Angelo MRA
65	West Texas Utilities Office	West Texas Utilities Office	November 25, 1988 (#88002552)	15 E. Beauregard; 31°27′45″N 100°26′08″W	San Angelo	San Angelo MRA
66	John C. Westbrook House		November 25, 1988 (#88002545)	600 West Ave. C 31°27′17″N 100°26′17″W	San Angelo	San Angelo MRA
67	John and Anton Willeke House	John and Anton Willeke House	November 25, 1988 (#88002573)	941 E. Harris; 31°27′53″N 100°25′17″W	San Angelo	San Angelo MRA
68	John Willeke Jr. House	John Willeke Jr. House	November 25, 1988 (#88002574)	1005 E. Harris; 31°27′54″N 100°25′16″W	San Angelo	San Angelo MRA
69	John Willeke Sr. House	John Willeke Sr. House	November 25, 1988 (#88002572)	931 E. Harris; 31°27′54″N 100°25′18″W	San Angelo	San Angelo MRA
70	Dr. M. M. Woodward House	Dr. M. M. Woodward House	November 25, 1988 (#88002549)	44 W. 25th St. 31°29′05″N 100°27′12″W	San Angelo	San Angelo MRA

== Former listings ==
	Name on the Register	Image	Date listed	Date removed	Location	City or town	Description
1	House at 410 Summit St.		November 25, 1988 (#88002591)	July 27, 1999	410 Summit St.	San Angelo	Delisted due to relocation for construction of the Houston Harte Expressway.

== See also ==
- National Register of Historic Places listings in Texas
- Recorded Texas Historic Landmarks in Tom Green County
