= Cactus Hotel =

Historic hotel in San Angelo, Texas, U.S.

- Hilton Hotel
- U.S. National Register of Historic Places
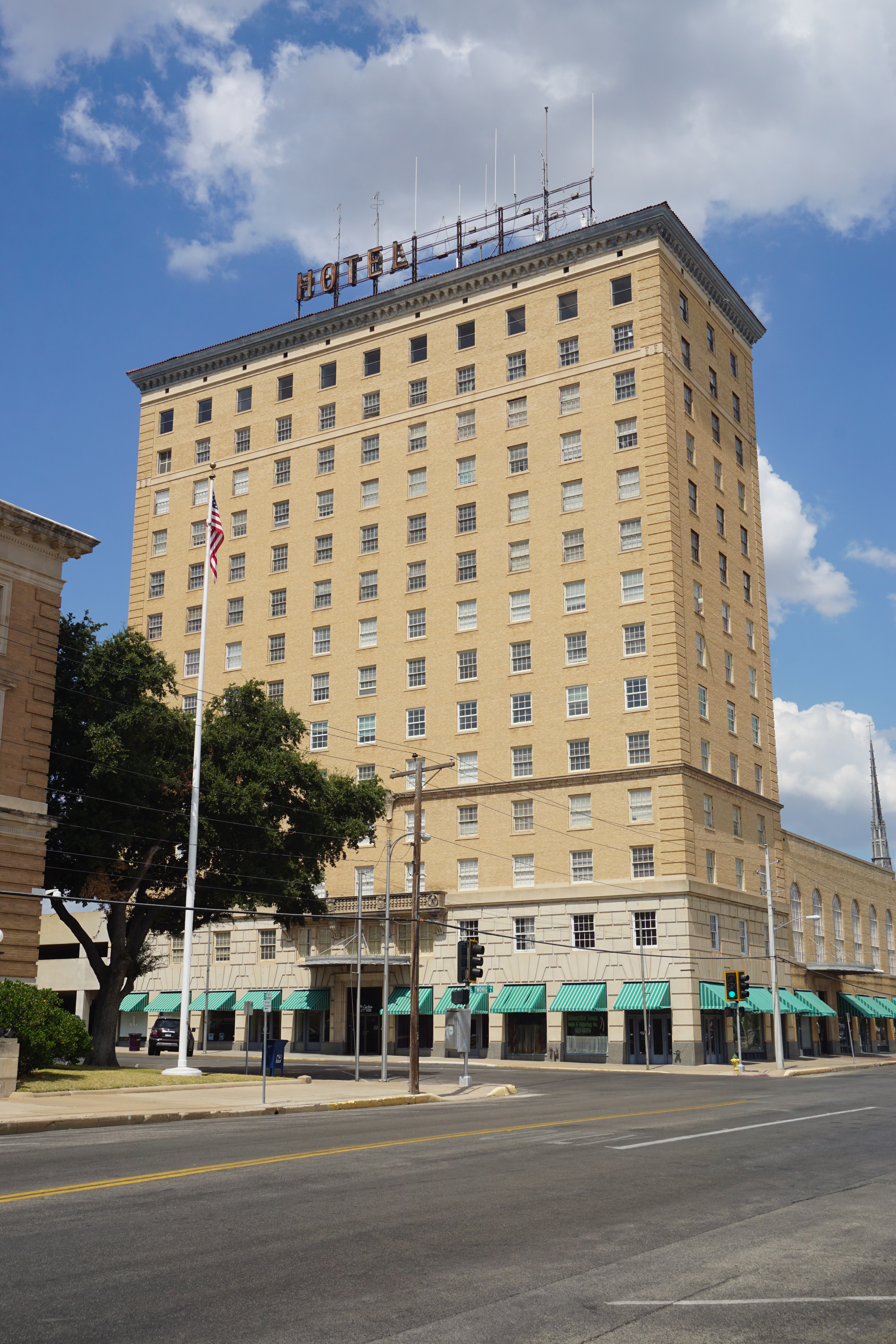
- Cactus Hotel from the southeast

- Location within Texas Location within the United States
- Location: San Angelo, Texas
- Coordinates: 31°27′42.7″N 100°26′5.1″W
- Built: 1928
- Architect: Anton F. Korn
- Website: www.cactushotel.net
- NRHP reference No.: 84001999
- Added to NRHP: September 20, 1984

The Cactus Hotel, previously known as the Hilton Hotel, is an historic hotel in downtown San Angelo, Texas. The hotel was built in 1929 and added to the National Register of Historic Places on September 20, 1984.

== Site ==
The hotel stands at 36 E. Twohig, on the northwest corner of Twohig and Oakes, in downtown San Angelo, Texas.

== History ==
In 1919, entrepreneur Conrad Hilton established a hotel chain that he began rapidly expanding across Texas in the 1920s. He constructed the Dallas Hilton in 1924–25, then identified several West Texas cities, including San Angelo, in which to open hotels. The construction of the Dallas Hilton had exceeded Hilton's budget, however, and he sought partnerships to limit future expenses in the construction of future hotels.

On March 5, 1928, the West Texas Lumber Company (WTLC) accounted that it had signed a 15-year lease with Hilton to build a hotel on the site of its offices. The WTLC began to move out of its offices to a new location in San Angelo, and delayed the start of construction of the San Angelo Hilton until the completion of their new office. Dallas-based architect Anton F. Korn was selected to design the hotel; his plans were made public on April 22, 1928. A test pit was dug at the site on April 5, to ascertain the quality of the hotel's future foundations. The construction and furnishing of the San Angelo Hilton was expected to cost $750,000 (equivalent to $14,062,500 in 2025).

To construct the hotel, Belvedere B. Hail, the president of the WTLC, formed the B. B. Hail Building Corporation (B. B. Hail) on June 19, 1928. The WTLC announced on June 5 that bids for contracts would open on June 20, for which contractors from six states began arriving by June 6. B. B. Hail received its charter on June 20 and began to hear bids. Robert E. McKee was awarded the general construction contract, the A. T. Cheaney Plumbing and Heating Company was awarded the contract for plumbing, heating, and ventilation, the Sun Electric Company was contracted to supply the hotel's wiring, and the Otis Elevator Company would supply its elevators. Theodore Montgomery was awarded the contract to demolish the WTLC's offices and began work on the site on July 6.

Excavations for the basement of the hotel began on July 23, 1928, and was largely completed by August 30. The excavation produced 8,000 cubic yards (6,100 m^{3}) of spoil that was disposed of by creating an athletic field at a nearby campground. After bedrock was reached digging continued with explosives, which resulted in rocks striking the O. C. Fisher Federal Building across the street. Construction had begun by September 16, when the San Angelo Standard-Times reported that the concrete pours for the hotel's first floor were almost complete. Pours for the uppermost portions of the hotel began on January 1, 1929, as did the erection of a steel frame for the roof and bricklaying, both completed on February 3. Interior work was mostly completed by April 14.

=== San Angelo Hilton ===
The San Angelo Hilton had its grand opening on May 31, 1929. The day started with tours of the hotel from 11:30 AM to 5:30 PM (CST) and concluded that night with a ball, and a wedding hosted within the hotel, which were broadcast on the radio station KGKL. Guests included Hilton, Hail, Houston Harte, the owner of the San Angelo Standard-Times, and W. H. Holcombe, the mayor of San Angelo. To manage the San Angelo Hilton, Hilton had first selected the manager of the Dallas Hilton, A. H. Hilton, who died of influenza on April 28, 1929, before he could assume the office. In his place, Hilton selected Sidney Abbott, the manager of the Waco Hilton. Much of the administrative staff were brought to the San Angelo from other Hilton hotels, while locals were hired for service positions; African-Americans were only hired for positions Abbott described as "heavy work".

=== Preservation ===
The Cactus Hotel was nominated for inclusion on the National Register of Historic Places on April 5, 1984, and surveyed by the Texas Historical Commission that August. The Keeper of the Register accepted the nomination and added the hotel to the National Register on September 20, 1984.

== Architecture ==
The Cactus Hotel contains 14 stories, with a mezzanine above the first floor, and stands 165 feet (50 m) tall. The exterior of the building is composed of a classical base, column, and capital, with an attached northern wing that simultaneously provides a ballroom and isolates the guest rooms from other buildings on the block.

The basement, first floor, and mezzanine together have a floor space of 16,875 square feet (1,567.7 m^{2}) and the other floors altogether have a floor space of about 6,250 square feet (581 m^{2}).

The building was designed in the Italian Renaissance style by Anton F. Korn, who had also designed the Tom Green County Courthouse and the San Angelo National Bank Building. Its skyscraper-like appearance was typical of hotels constructed in Texas in the first decades of the 20th century.

=== Reception ===
In Architecture in Texas: 1895-1945, historian Jay C. Henry called the composition of the Cactus Hotel's exterior "rather weak and unconvincing."

== Sources ==
- Henry, Jay C. (1993). Architecture in Texas: 1895-1945. University of Texas Press. ISBN 9780292730724.
- Hilton, Conrad (1994) [1957]. Be My Guest. Simon & Schuster. ISBN 9780671761745.
- Ingham, John N. (1983). Biographical Dictionary of American Business Leaders. Vol. 2. Greenwood Publishing Group. ISBN 9780313239083.
- Noelke, Virginia (1996). A History of the Cactus Hotel. San Angelo Cultural Affairs Office. OCLC 38489054.
- Williams, Kim Alan; Barr, Britten (September 20, 1984). "National Register of Historic Places Inventory-Nomination: Hotel Cactus / Hilton Hotel" (pdf). National Park Service – via NARA.
