= National Register of Historic Places listings in Schleicher County, Texas =

Location of Schleicher County in Texas

This is a list of the National Register of Historic Places listings in Schleicher County, Texas.

This is intended to be a complete list of properties and districts listed on the National Register of Historic Places in Schleicher County, Texas. There is one property listed on the National Register in the county.

This National Park Service list is complete through NPS recent listings posted March 21, 2025.

== Current listings ==
| | Name on the Register | Image | Date listed | Location | City or town | Description |
|---|---|---|---|---|---|---|
| 1 | Mittel Site | Mittel Site | January 4, 1990 (#89002278) | Address restricted | Eldorado | Smithsonian trinomial 41SL15 |

== See also ==
- National Register of Historic Places listings in Texas
- Recorded Texas Historic Landmarks in Schleicher County
