= Hotel Andaluz =

Historic hotel in Albuquerque, New Mexico

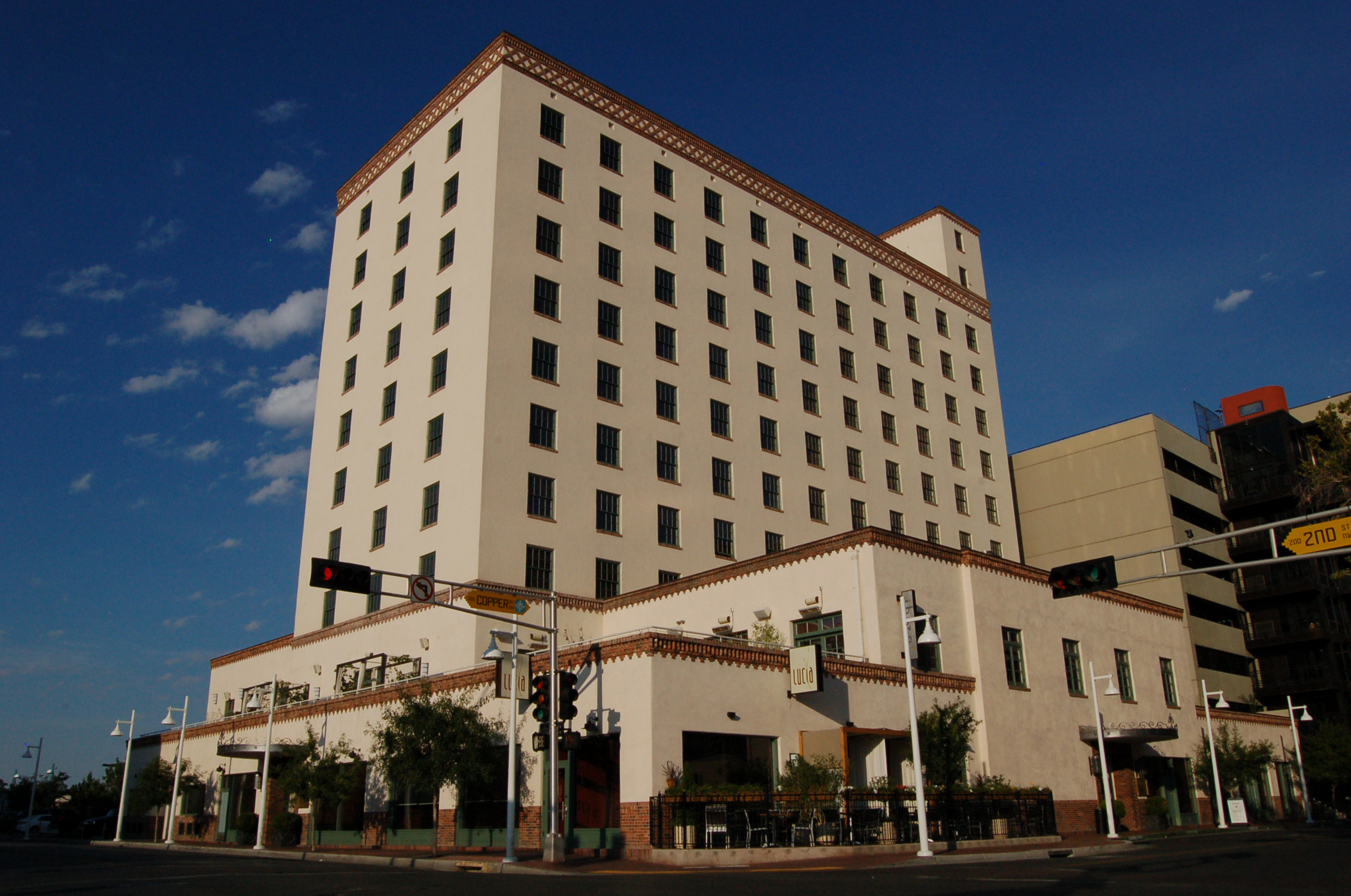
- Hotel Andaluz, 2012

- Location within New Mexico Location within the United States

General information
- Type: Hotel
- Location: 125 2nd St. NW; Albuquerque, New Mexico
- Coordinates: 35°5′6″N 106°38′56″W
- Completed: 1939
- Owner: Goodman Realty Group

Height
- Roof: 41.1 m (135 ft)

Technical details
- Floor count: 10

Design and construction
- Architect: Anton F. Korn
- Old Hilton Hotel
- U.S. National Register of Historic Places
- NM State Register of Cultural Properties
- Albuquerque Historic Landmark
- Area: less than one acre
- NRHP reference No.: 84002868
- NMSRCP No.: 992

Significant dates
- Added to NRHP: March 2, 1984
- Designated NMSRCP: December 16, 1983

Hotel Andaluz is a historic high-rise hotel in Downtown Albuquerque, New Mexico. It opened in 1939 as the Hilton Hotel, part of the Hilton Hotels chain. After operating under various names since the 1970s, the hotel was renovated and reopened under its current name in 2009. In 2019 it joined the Curio Collection by Hilton brand.

The property was listed (as Old Hilton Hotel) on the New Mexico State Register of Cultural Properties in 1983 and the National Register of Historic Places in 1984. It has also been designated an Albuquerque historic landmark.

== History ==
Opened on June 9, 1939, the Hilton was the first modern high-rise hotel in New Mexico. It was one of the first hotels in Conrad Hilton's Hilton Hotels chain and the first Hilton-branded hotel outside the state of Texas. Architect Anton F. Korn designed the 160-room ten-story building in the New Mexico Territorial Revival style, with earthtone stucco, brick coping along the roofline, and southwest-style woodwork and furnishings. After a new Hilton opened near the Big I freeway interchange in 1971, the older hotel was sold in 1974 and rebranded as the Hotel Plaza. It was sold again in 1981 and closed. The new owners planned to restore it as the Hotel Bradford, but the hotel sat vacant and never opened under that name. The hotel was finally renovated in 1984, with the number of rooms reduced to 114, and reopened on August 3, 1984 as La Posada de Albuquerque.

In 2005, the hotel was purchased by Gary Goodman, whose company Goodman Realty Group is also behind the upcoming Winrock Town Center. In March 2008, the hotel underwent an extensive $30 million renovation and restoration, reopening as Hotel Andaluz on October 1, 2009. The hotel was honored with LEED Gold certification for its sustainability, and has been recognized many times over the years by Conde Nast as one of the top hotels in the U.S. southwest. The property features Char, a restaurant celebrating "New Mexico's rich culinary heritage" under the helm of Chef Marco A. Espinoza which opened in March 2025. It also offers the Ibiza Urban Rooftop Lounge and an extensive live entertainment program on weekends. 6,000 square feet (560 m^{2}) of conference facilities.

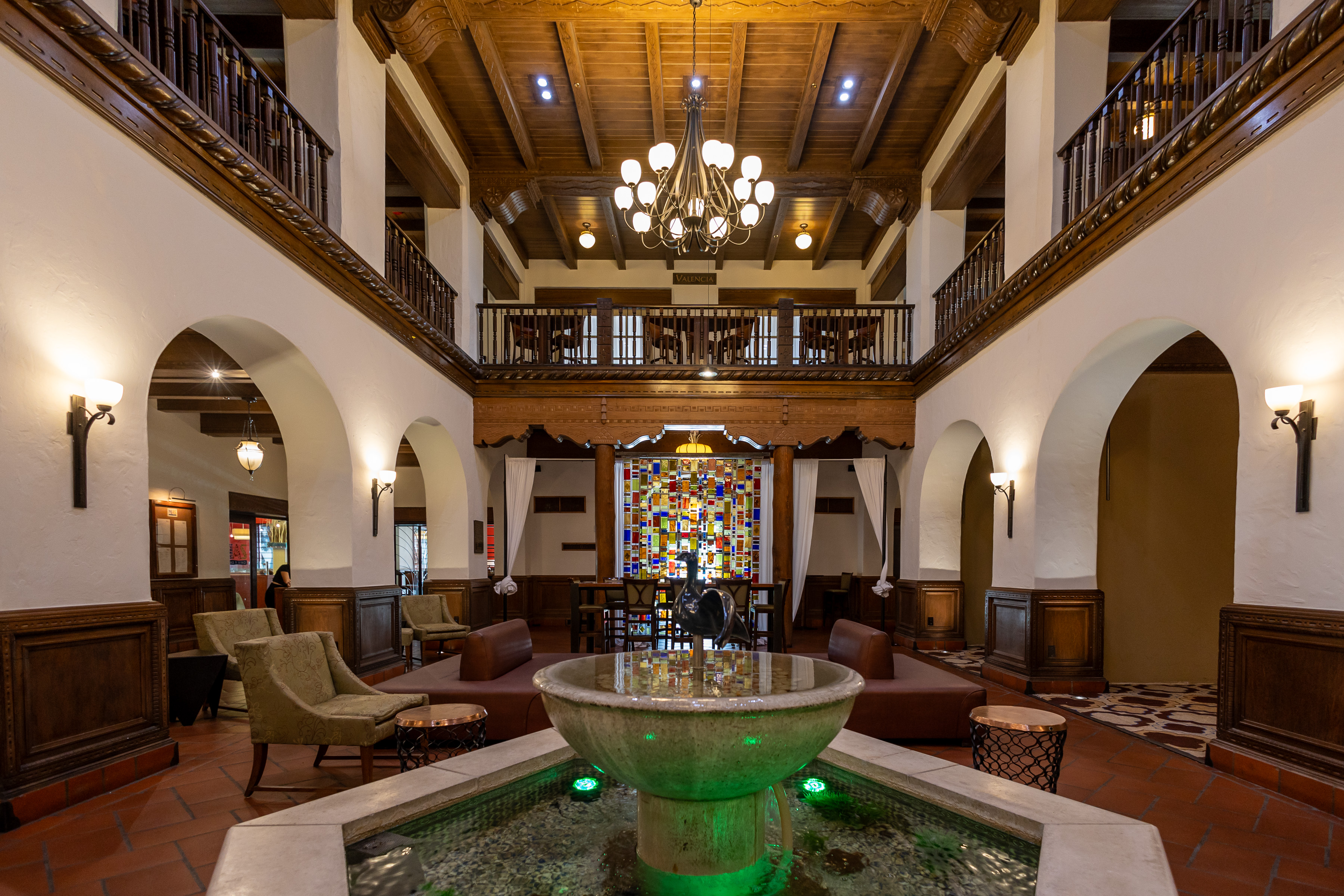
Hotel Andaluz Lobby

In its National Register listing it was deemed "exceptionally significant in the city as the last of Albuquerque's three great 'southwestern' hotels. Like the Alvarado Hotel (built 1903, demolished 1969) and the Franciscan Hotel (built 1923, demolished 1972), the Hilton reflects the building techniques of its time while displaying the traditional New Mexican decor which denotes the city's importance as a regional tourist center. In the old Hilton the generous use of local crafts and materials was combined with the most advanced building techniques available just before World War II. In its heyday it served the city as a social and political center before giving way to newer hotels built farther east near the new freeways."

In 2019, the hotel became part of the Curio Collection by Hilton chain, returning it to Hilton branding.

== In popular culture ==
During 2019, the hotel was used as a location for scenes in the fifth series of the television drama Better Call Saul.
