= National Register of Historic Places listings in Midland County, Texas =

Location of Midland County in Texas

This is a list of the National Register of Historic Places listings in Midland County, Texas.

This is intended to be a complete list of properties and districts listed on the National Register of Historic Places in Midland County, Texas. There are five properties listed on the National Register in the county including two that are Recorded Texas Historic Landmarks.

This National Park Service list is complete through NPS recent listings posted March 21, 2025.

== Current listings ==
The locations of National Register properties may be seen in a mapping service provided.

	Name on the Register	Image	Date listed	Location	City or town	Description
1	Brown-Dorsey House	Brown-Dorsey House	June 17, 1982 (#82004516)	213 N. Weatherford; 31°59′55″N 102°04′19″W	Midland	Recorded Texas Historic Landmark
2	George W. Bush Childhood Home	George W. Bush Childhood Home	July 28, 2004 (#04000768)	1412 W. Ohio; 32°00′02″N 102°05′24″W	Midland	Recorded Texas Historic Landmark
3	Midland Tower	Midland Tower	January 27, 2015 (#14001228)	223 West Wall Street; 31°59′50″N 102°04′36″W	Midland	
4	Fred and Juliette Turner House	Fred and Juliette Turner House	August 15, 1988 (#88001148)	1705 W. Missouri; 31°59′36″N 102°05′29″W	Midland	
5	Vaughn Building	Vaughn Building	June 7, 2016 (#16000352)	400 W. Texas Ave. 31°59′55″N 102°04′42″W	Midland	

== See also ==
- National Register of Historic Places listings in Texas
- Recorded Texas Historic Landmarks in Midland County
