= Masonic Lodge 570 =

- U.S. National Register of Historic Places
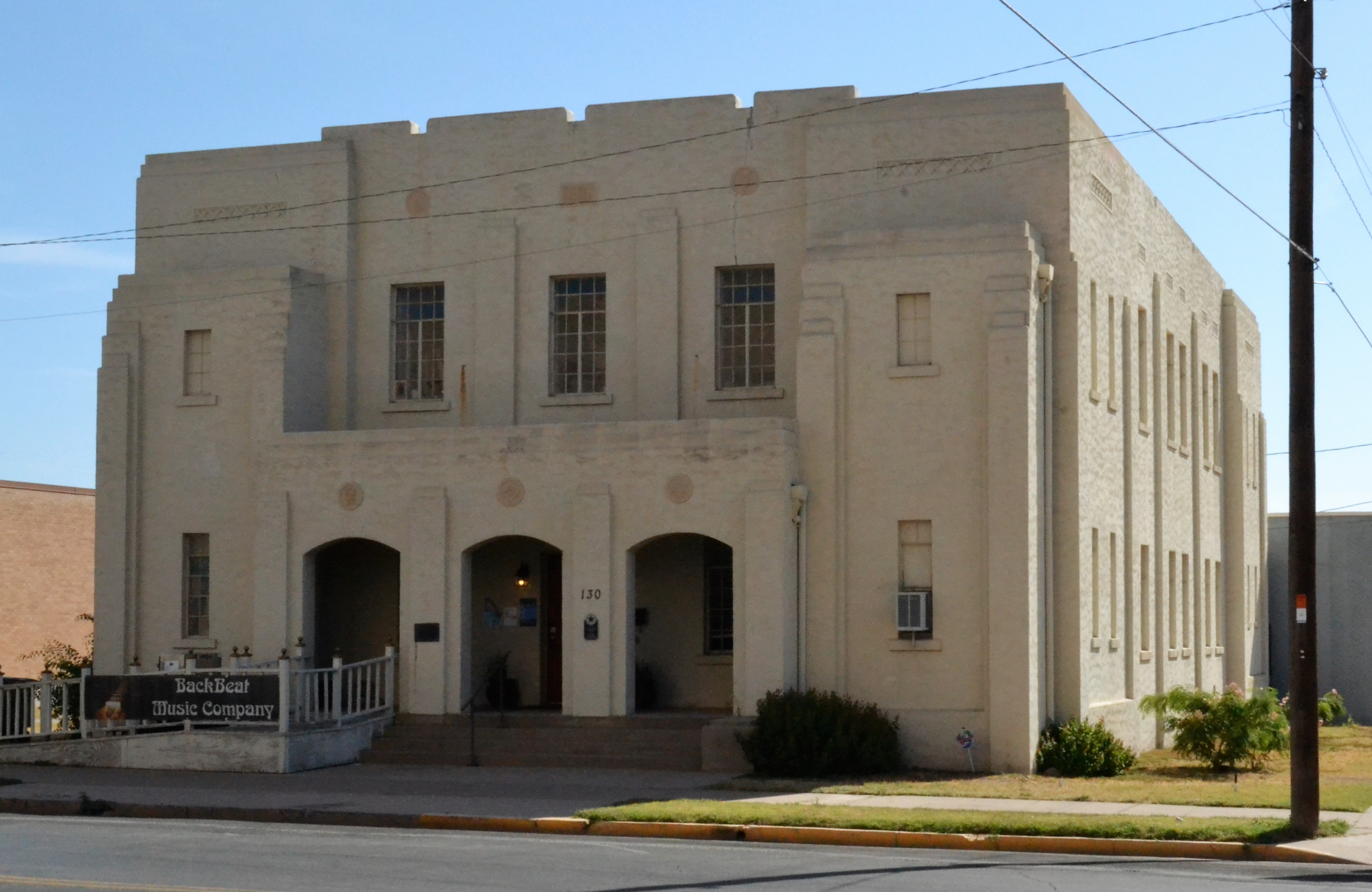

- Location within Texas Location within the United States
- Location: 130 S. Oakes, San Angelo, Texas
- Coordinates: 31°27′44″N 100°26′2″W
- Area: less than one acre
- Built: 1927-1931
- Architectural style: Moderne
- MPS: San Angelo MRA
- NRHP reference No.: 88002580
- Added to NRHP: November 25, 1988

The Masonic Lodge 570 building is a historic Moderne style building in San Angelo, Texas, United States. The building was constructed during 1927–31 as a commercial space plus a meeting hall for San Angelo Lodge #570 (a local area Masonic lodge). It was listed on the National Register of Historic Places in 1988.

It is a two-story stuccoed commercial building that is a rare local example of Art Moderne architecture.

== See also ==
- National Register of Historic Places listings in Tom Green County, Texas
