= First Presbyterian Church (San Angelo, Texas) =

Presbyterian church in San Angelo, Texas, United States

- U.S. National Register of Historic Places
- Recorded Texas Historic Landmark
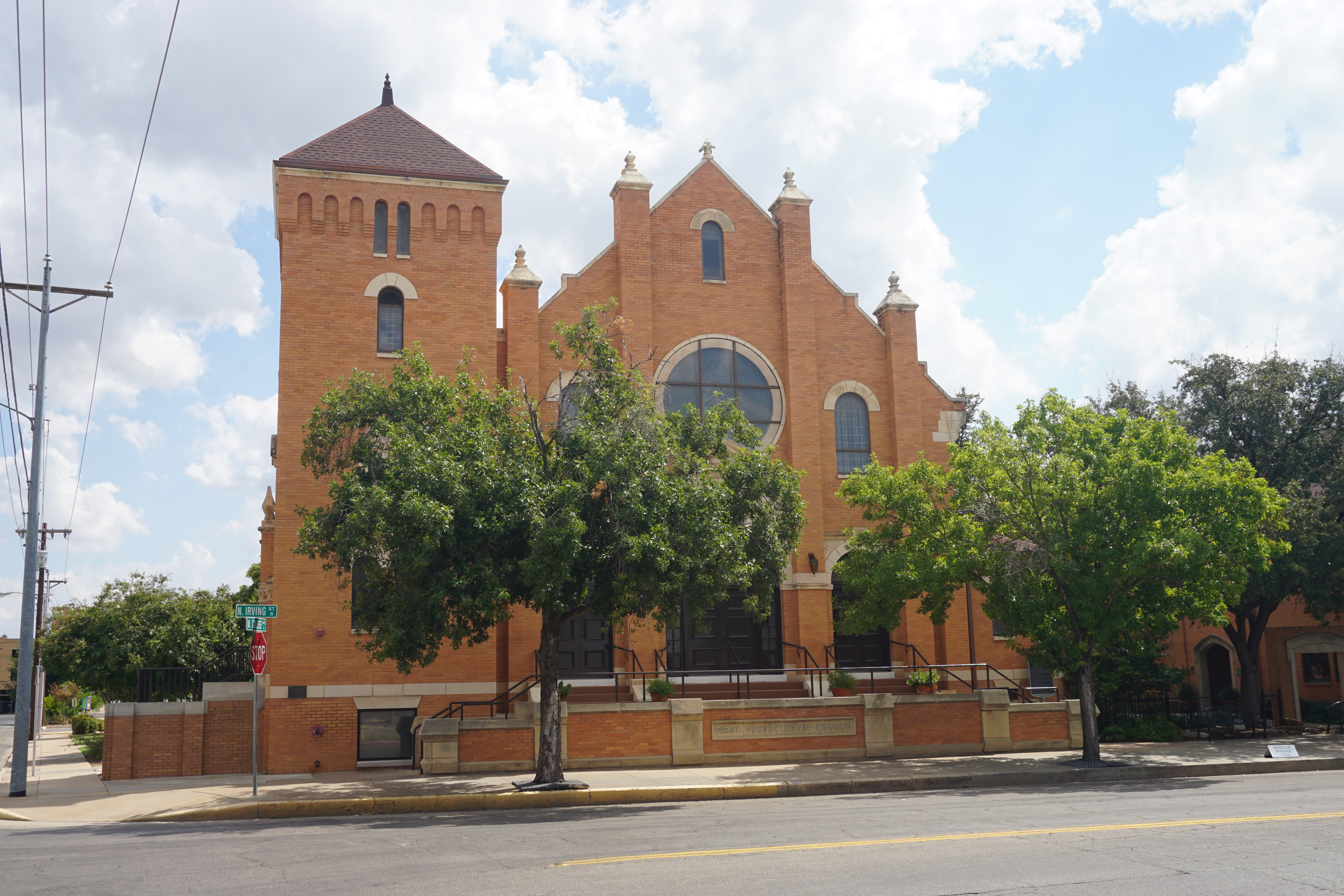
- Location: San Angelo, Texas
- Coordinates: 31°27′51″N 100°26′30″W
- Architectural style: Eclectic
- MPS: San Angelo MRA
- NRHP reference No.: 88002604
- RTHL No.: 88002604

Significant dates
- Added to NRHP: 25 November 1988
- Designated RTHL: 25 November 1988

First Presbyterian is a historic Presbyterian church in San Angelo, Texas. It was built in 1906 and added to the National Register of Historic Places in 1988, part of the San Angelo Multiple Resources Area. The building is also a Recorded Texas Historic Landmark.

== History ==
The First Presbyterian Church of San Angelo was organized in a meeting chaired by Presbyterian missionary J.H. Zivley on 1 February 1885. The congregation's first years were fruitful; in 1887, it purchased three lots on Irving Street for $500 (equivalent to $17,917 in 2025). On that site, they commissioned local architect Oscar Ruffini to build a church for $1,100 (equivalent to $39,417 in 2025).

A sanctuary and school were commissioned in 1906 from the L.B. Valk Architectural Company. The work was completed in 1908 at a cost of $40,000 (equivalent to $1,433,333 in 2025). The tower was reduced in height from 1925 to 1956.

=== Preservation ===
The church was nominated for the National Register of Historic Places by the state of Texas on 4 October 1988. The nomination was accepted on 25 November 1988, and First Presbyterian was made the 14th property in the San Angelo Multiple Resources Area.

== Architecture ==
First Presbyterian stands at 32 North Irving Street in downtown San Angelo, across the street from City Hall.

The church is built of brick, with stone ornament, in an Eclectic style. The plan is cruciform, with a tower at the west end, beside the entrance. That entrance is elevated above the sidewalk by a set of stairs. The façade is formed by three round arches for the entryway, each separated by brick pilasters. These pilasters rise all the way to the top of the parapet gable and end with a finial. Above each doorway is a window, the middle of which is a rose window rising from a stone pediment above the central doorway. The tower has three stories and ends with a Romanesque-style corbel table and a four-sided pyramidal roof. As originally planned and constructed, the tower was topped with a steeple.

== See also ==
- National Register of Historic Places listings in Tom Green County, Texas

== Notes ==
=== References ===
- "National Register of Historic Places Registration: First Presbyterian Church". National Park Service. 11 October 1988. Downloading may be slow.
