= Montgomery Ward Building (San Angelo, Texas) =

- U.S. National Register of Historic Places
- Location within Texas Location within the United States
- Location: 10 W. Beauregard; San Angelo, Texas
- Coordinates: 31°27′45″N 100°26′13″W
- Area: less than one acre
- Built: 1927
- Architect: Oscar Ruffini
- MPS: San Angelo MRA
- NRHP reference No.: 88002553
- Added to NRHP: November 25, 1988

The Montgomery Ward Building in downtown San Angelo, Texas was a historic department store building designed by architect Oscar Ruffini. It was built in 1927 and was listed on the National Register of Historic Places in 1988.

It was a two-story buff brick building. It incorporated elements of an earlier building built in 1906.

== See also ==
- Montgomery Ward
- National Register of Historic Places listings in Tom Green County, Texas
