= Emmanuel Episcopal Church (San Angelo, Texas) =

Historic church in Texas, United States

- U.S. National Register of Historic Places
- Recorded Texas Historic Landmark
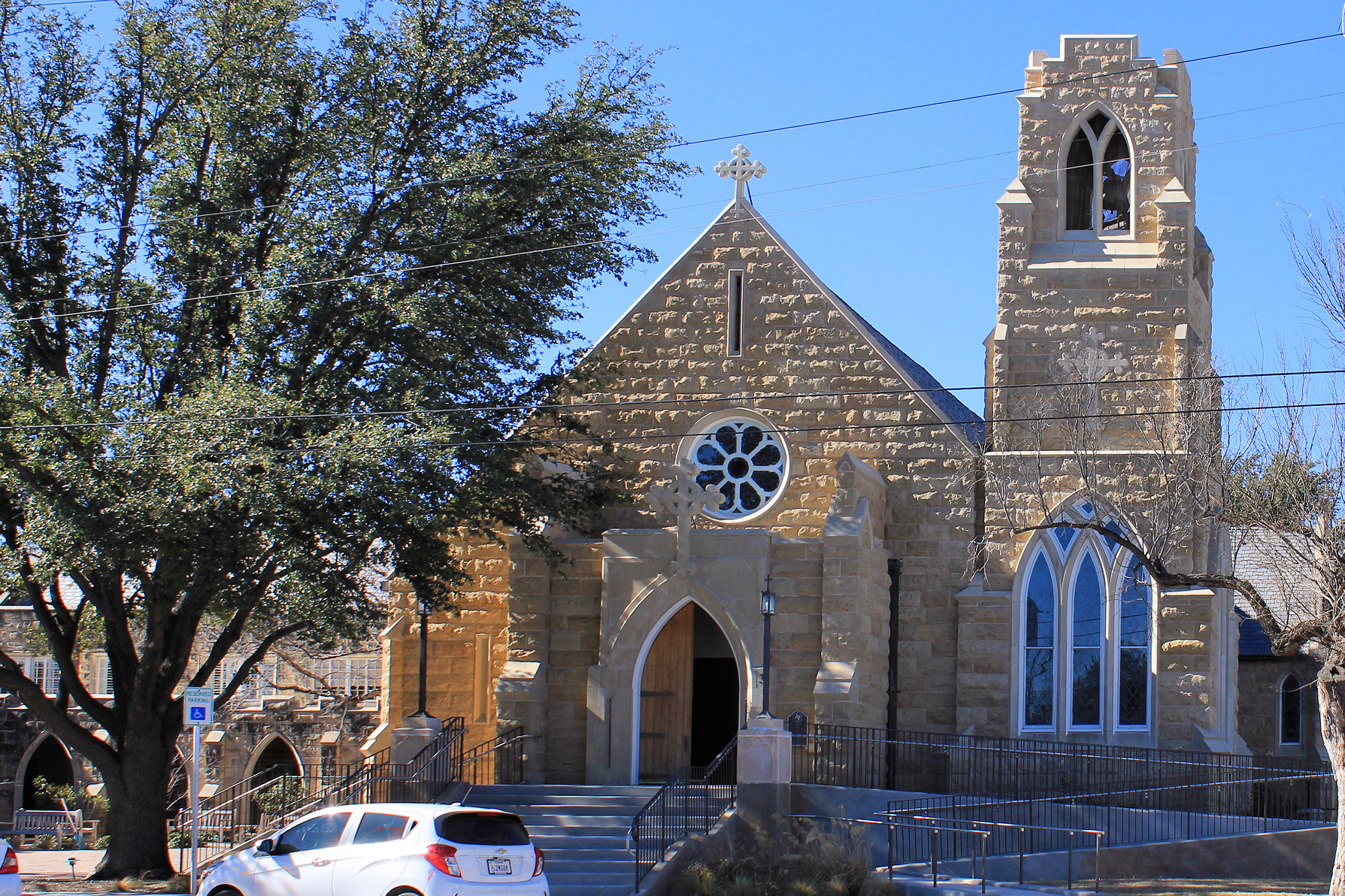

- Location within Texas Location within the United States
- Location: 3 S. Randolph, San Angelo, Texas
- Coordinates: 31°27′44″N 100°26′27″W
- Area: less than one acre
- Built: 1929
- Built by: H.F. Templeton
- Architect: John G. Becker
- Architectural style: Eclectic, Modern Gothic
- MPS: San Angelo MRA
- NRHP reference No.: 88002590
- RTHL No.: 1478

Significant dates
- Added to NRHP: November 25, 1988
- Designated RTHL: 1967

The Emmanuel Episcopal Church in San Angelo, Texas is a historic church located at 3 S. Randolph. It is a parish of the Episcopal Diocese of Northwest Texas.

No membership statistics were reported in 2024 national parochial reports. In 2015, the church reported 330 members; in 2023, it reported 404 members. Plate and pledge financial support reported by the church in 2024 was $969,475. Average Sunday Attendance ASA reported in 2024 was 93 persons. This was a relative decrease on ASA of 159 in 2018.

== History ==
The church was founded in 1885–87. Its building was built in 1929 and added to the National Register of Historic Places in 1988. It is an ashlar stone faced church with a Gothic arch entry. The stone was recycled from the former Tom Green County courthouse, demolished in 1927. An education wing was added in 1950 and was later extended, with compatible materials and styling.

== See also ==
- National Register of Historic Places listings in Texas
