= Greater St. Paul AME Church =

Historic church in Texas, United States

- U.S. National Register of Historic Places
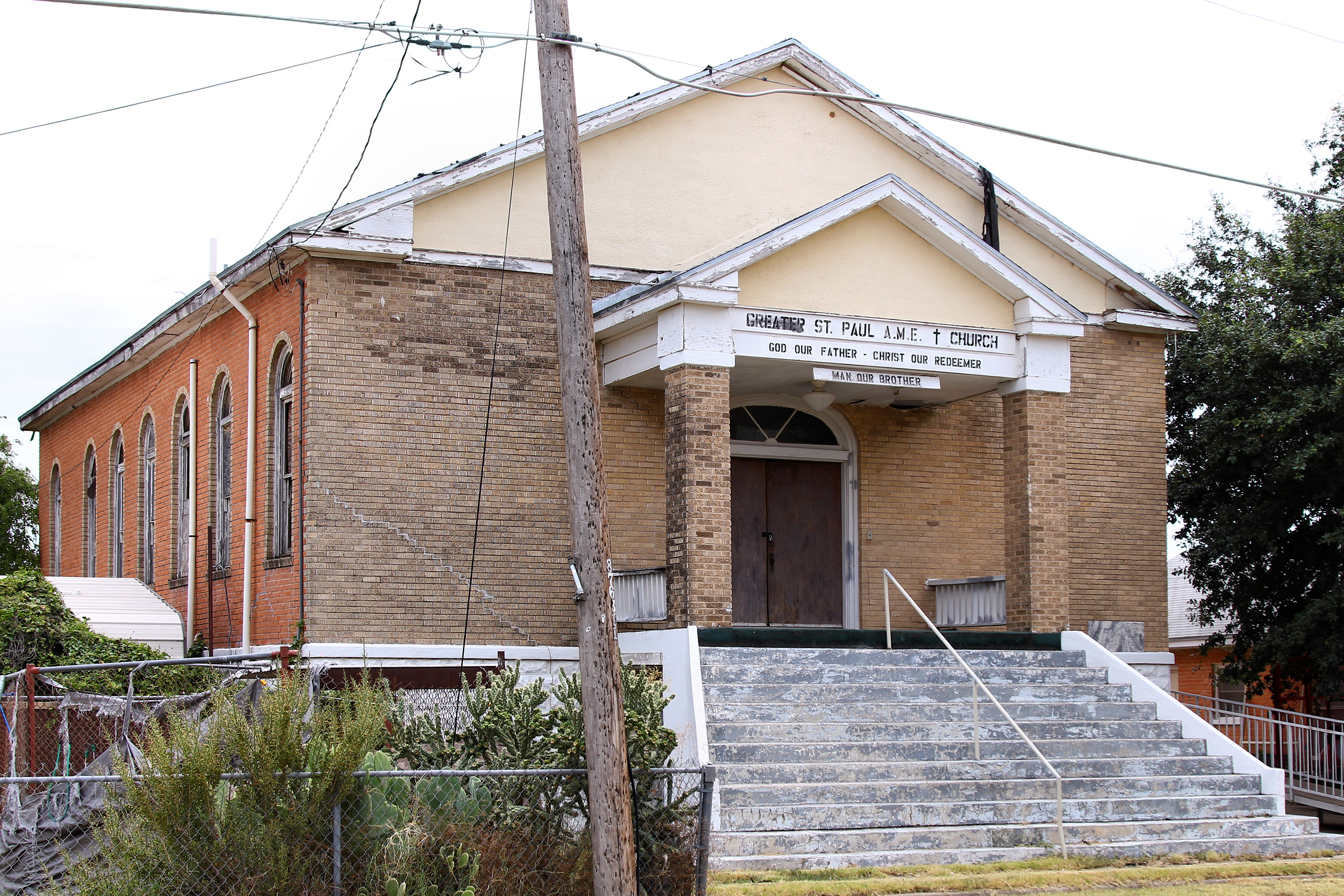
- The building in 2019

- Location within Texas Location within the United States
- Location: 215 W. 3rd St., San Angelo, Texas
- Coordinates: 31°27′55″N 100°26′33″W
- Area: less than one acre
- Built: 1927
- MPS: San Angelo MRA
- NRHP reference No.: 88002548
- Added to NRHP: November 25, 1988

The Greater St. Paul AME Church is a historic African Methodist Episcopal church at 215 W. 3rd Street in San Angelo, Texas, United States. It was built in 1927 and added to the National Register in 1988.

Its congregation was organized in 1883.

== See also ==
- National Register of Historic Places listings in Tom Green County, Texas
