= Bush Family Home State Historic Site =

Historic house in Texas, United States

- U.S. National Register of Historic Places
- Recorded Texas Historic Landmark
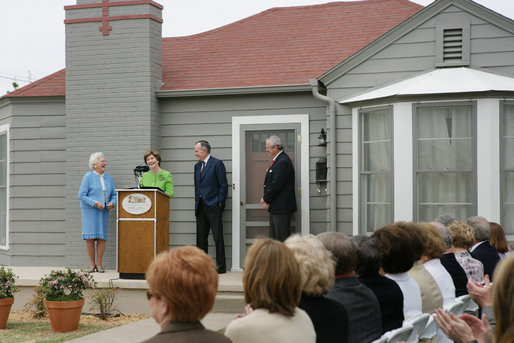
- Barbara Bush, Laura Bush, George H. W. Bush and Joseph I. O'Neill, III (who introduced George W. and Laura in Midland) at the dedication of the George W. Bush Childhood Home

- Location within Texas Location within the United States
- Location: 1412 W. Ohio, Midland, Texas
- Coordinates: 31°59′55″N 102°5′28.6″W
- Area: less than one acre
- Built: 1940
- Architect: Houston Hill
- Architectural style: Minimal Traditional
- NRHP reference No.: 04000768
- RTHL No.: 15411

Significant dates
- Added to NRHP: July 28, 2004
- Designated RTHL: 2004

Bush Family Home State Historic Site is a historic house that was home to former U.S. Presidents George W. Bush and George H. W. Bush from 1951 to 1955. It is located at 1412 W. Ohio Ave. in Midland, Texas.

The home was built in 1939 and was purchased by the Bush family in 1951 for $9,000 (equivalent to $112,000 in 2025). They lived in the 1,400-square-foot (130 m^{2}) home until late 1955. It was also the earliest childhood home of Governor Jeb Bush. The house was added to the National Register of Historic Places on July 28, 2004. It was purchased for $100,000 to become the museum, which had its opening dedication on April 11, 2006. The house, formerly the George W. Bush Childhood Home, was transferred to the Texas Historical Commission in 2023.

== See also ==
- List of residences of presidents of the United States
- National Register of Historic Places listings in Midland County, Texas
- Recorded Texas Historic Landmarks in Midland County
