= Carmelite Monastery =

- U.S. National Register of Historic Places
- Recorded Texas Historic Landmark
- Location within Texas Location within the United States
- Location: 400 E. Carpenter St., Stanton, Texas
- Coordinates: 32°8′2″N 101°47′21″W
- Area: 3.3 acres (1.3 ha)
- Built: 1882
- Architectural style: Gothic
- NRHP reference No.: 99000566
- RTHL No.: 12545

Significant dates
- Added to NRHP: November 3, 1999
- Designated RTHL: 2000

Carmelite Monastery (Sisters of Mercy Convent) is a historic monastery at 400 E. Carpenter Street in Stanton, Texas.

It was built in 1882 and added to the National Register of Historic Places in 1999.

The property was also designated a Recorded Texas Historic Landmark.

== See also ==
- National Register of Historic Places listings in Martin County, Texas
- Recorded Texas Historic Landmarks in Martin County
