= Architecture in Texas, 1895–1945 =

1993 book

- Author: Jay C. Henry
- Publisher: University of Texas Press
- Publication date: 1993

Architecture in Texas, 1895–1945 is a 1993 book written by Jay C. Henry and published by the University of Texas Press. Kenneth Breisch of the Journal of the Society of Architectural Historians described the book as "a thorough analysis of building styles in the state from 1895 to 1945." It was the first comprehensive study of Texas architecture of that period. The author's thesis, stated on page one of the book, was that this period of architecture represented "a large cross section of America in microcosm". According to Joseph L. Aranha of Texas Tech University the book also serves as an "encyclopedia of the works of Texas architects" and a "catalog of significant buildings and architectural styles in Texas".

== Contents ==
The book contains information on various types of buildings. The selection is mostly populated with structures in large cities, and the book does not describe agricultural and ranch buildings. The author categorizes each building by style and compares them to other structures in the United States East Coast, Chicago, and Europe. Most buildings in the book were, at the time of publication, still standing, but the author included any demolished ones which had "essential tendencies better than any surviving example". Some buildings featured were not designed by architects.

There is a chapter on public housing and a two-page discussion of Highland Park Shopping Village in the Dallas-Fort Worth area; the other building descriptions do not contain analyses of any urban development, technological, historical, nor social aspects. The book, according to Breisch, does not have a lot of detail on the architect and client interaction processes nor on the design processes of the buildings.

Much of the material used in the book had not been previously published.

Drexel Turner of The Menil Collection described the contents as "a parade of often repetitive buildings that are explained chiefly in terms of stylistic derivation." Breisch argued that the author had taken "strains to pigeonhole Texas buildings into preconceived stylistic slots". Aranha argued that the organizational style used stymies the reader's understanding of the chronology of the buildings and that it was possible that some buildings were not included because the author could not fit them into his categorization system. Aranha added that because some buildings were not designed by architects it was surprising that he did not include rural structures.

=== Graphics ===
There are 397 images, including 380 photographs. Most of the photographs in the book are views of the buildings's exteriors; they are generally of the whole building and are 4.5 inches (110 mm) by 3.5 inches (89 mm). They are in black-and-white and the author took most of the pictures. Five photographs depict building details and four depict interiors. Most building featured in the book have one photograph apiece.

There are 17 line drawings, including detail and plan drawings which depict some campuses, housing projects, individual houses, and the Texas Centennial Exposition. There are six site detail graphics in total for campuses, the exposition, and housing projects; and nine detail graphics for individual houses.

Turner stated that the lack of photographs hampers the depiction of the Isabella Court in Midtown Houston and some other architectural works. Christopher Long of Austin, Texas wrote in the Southwestern Historical Quarterly that there should have been archival plan drawings as that would show the evolution in architecture. Aranha stated that if additional floor plan drawings were included they could communicate information about alterations or demolitions.

== Reception ==
Aranha concluded that even though there were some "shortcomings", "Henry is to be given due credit for producing a scholarly survey of a variety of significant buildings".

Long stated that "Hopefully the book will inspire others to take a closer look at this lively and interesting period." Long argued that the book did not show "a social history of Texas architecture" even though the book jacket stated that it was in the book, and that his thesis "does little to illuminate the forces and ideas that combined to create the diverse architectural landscape."

Turner argued that the book should have put more focus on fewer works of architecture.
