= Anton Korn =

American architect (1886–1942)

Anton F. Korn (1886-August 23, 1942) was an American architect based in Texas, known mostly for his residences. A large number of the works are in Dallas and in the Dallas enclave Highland Park, Texas. A number of his works are listed on the National Register of Historic Places for their architecture, and two or three on Galveston Island are even included in a National Historic Landmark district.

== Personal life ==
He was born in 1886.

== Works ==
He designed numerous buildings including several which are listed on the National Register of Historic Places (NRHP).

Works include:

- J. B. Blakeney House, 438 W. Twohig, San Angelo, Texas (Anton Korn & B.M. Morgan) NRHP-listed.
- Hilton Hotel (now the Cactus Hotel) (1928), 36 E. Twohig St., San Angelo, Texas, NRHP-listed.
- Old Hilton Hotel (1938), 125 2nd St., NW, Albuquerque, New Mexico, Anton Korn with local architects Thomas Danahy and W.J.B. Sullivan. This has also been known as the Hotel Andaluz, Hotel Plaza, and La Posada. NRHP-listed.
- San Angelo National Bank Building, 201 S. Chadbourne St., San Angelo, Texas (Anton F. Korn). NRHP-listed.
- Tom Green County Courthouse, 100 W. Beauregard, San Angelo, Texas Anton Korn. NRHP-listed.
- Fred and Juliette Turner House, 1705 W. Missouri, Midland, Texas. Anton F. Korn, Jr. NRHP-listed.
- Hillcrest Mausoleum, Dallas, Texas
- 4700 Preston (1917), Highland Park, Texas was a home of Electra Waggoner Biggs (1912 – 2001), a Texas-born heiress, socialite and sculptor, widely known as owner of the Waggoner Ranch in Texas as well as her sculptures of Will Rogers, Dwight Eisenhower, Harry Truman, Bob Hope and Knute Rockne — and for having both a plane, the Lockheed L-188 Electra turboprop, and a car, the Buick Electra, named after her, the latter by her brother-in-law, Harlow H. Curtice, former president of Buick and later president of General Motors. "As well as living at the Waggoner Ranch, Biggs maintained a home at 4700 Preston Road in Dallas, designed by locally noted architect Anton Korn".
- 6676 Lakewood Boulevard, Dallas, Texas. Italian Renaissance in style.
- 3601 Crescent Avenue, Highland Park, Texas. Prairie-influenced.
- 3708 Alice Circle, Highland Park, Texas.
- 3700 Miramar Avenue, Highland Park, Texas.
- 3711 Beverly Drive, Highland Park, Texas.
- 3727 Beverly Drive, Highland Park, Texas.
- 4201 Lakeside Drive, Highland Park, Texas.
- 4301 Lakeside Drive (1924), Highland Park, Texas. 10,236 square feet (951.0 m^{2}).
- 4900 Lakeside Drive, Highland Park, Texas. Chateauesque(?).
- 4302 Overhill Drive, Highland Park, Texas. Tudor Revival.
- 3635 Beverly Drive (1924), Highland Park, Texas. Tudor Revival. Designed in 1924 by Korn. Has oak timbers from old Oriental Hotel.

An amateur detective sorted out that this was Korn's own home and posted that, and the facts were confirmed by someone who grew up in the house and whose family still owned it. And further commented: "It has lots of interesting details aside from the columns that he salvaged from the Oriental hotel. There’s a balcony in the three-story living room he designed for his wife who is an opera singer. When they would entertain she would stand on the balcony and sing to their guests."

- 3615 Beverly Drive, Highland Park, Texas.
- 4248 Armstrong Parkway, Highland Park, Texas.
- 4208 Armstrong Parkway, Highland Park, Texas.
- 4216 Versailles Avenue, Highland Park, Texas.
- 4221 Versailles Avenue, Highland Park, Texas.
- 4429 Belclaire Avenue, Highland Park, Texas.
- 3900 Potomac Avenue, Highland Park, Texas. Tudor Revival.
- 3319 Bryn Mawr Drive, University Park, Texas.
- 5451 Wateka Drive, Dallas, Texas.
- 3816 Stratford Avenue, Highland Park, Texas
- 23 Ash Bluff Lane, Dallas, Texas.

Several works in Galveston on Broadway St., which are therefore included in the East End Historic District (Galveston, Texas) (which includes both sides of Broadway St.) The historic district, designated locally in 1970, was placed on the National Register of Historic Places in 1975 and further declared a National Historic Landmark in 1976.

His Galveston works include:

- 1428 Broadway St., Galveston (1916). The Anton F. Korn home in Galveston, Texas, at 1428 Broadway St, is a substantial brick home: "[b]uilt in 1916 for the Wilken's family the home was built after 1900 storm to withstand future hurricanes-which it has."
- Biehl House, 1416 Broadway St., Galveston.
- "1916 Runge House", Galveston, Texas (1916). This, another home in Galveston designed by Korn was also built in 1916. It is in Galveston Island's East End Historic District.

In "Thoughts on the Contributions of Architect Anton Korn", realtor Doug Newby commented:

Anton Korn designed many impressive homes in Dallas and Highland Park [an enclave town which, with one other town, is surrounded by Dallas] just prior to and in the 1920s. He may have been the only architect of his caliber to have also been involved in speculative homes in this period, maybe even as a partner in a home building company. By the 1930s he was the prominent Dallas architect of significant homes. He designed one of the most refined homes in Dallas in 1933 on Lakewood Boulevard. From 1917 to 1920 he designed houses for Hugh E. Prather, Highland Park; Mrs. Cicero Smith, Beverly Drive; William Bacon], Beverly Drive; Hugh Bell, St. John's Drive; Worth Wimberley, Beverly Drive; Thomas Morrissey, Turtle Creek Boulevard; and Henry Boazman, Maple Avenue. The Beverly Drive property was designed in 1924 utilizing replaned oak timbers from the grand Oriental Hotel when it was torn down. Ted Larson was a renovating architect of 3708 Alice Circle, which was originally designed by Anton Korn in 1924. Korn's Tudor design can also be seen at 4500 Lakeside, 4328 Overhill and 5505 Keller Springs Road. At 4700 Preston Road, on 7.7 acres, he designed the home in a Georgian or Colonial Revival style.
