= J. B. Blakeney House =

- U.S. National Register of Historic Places
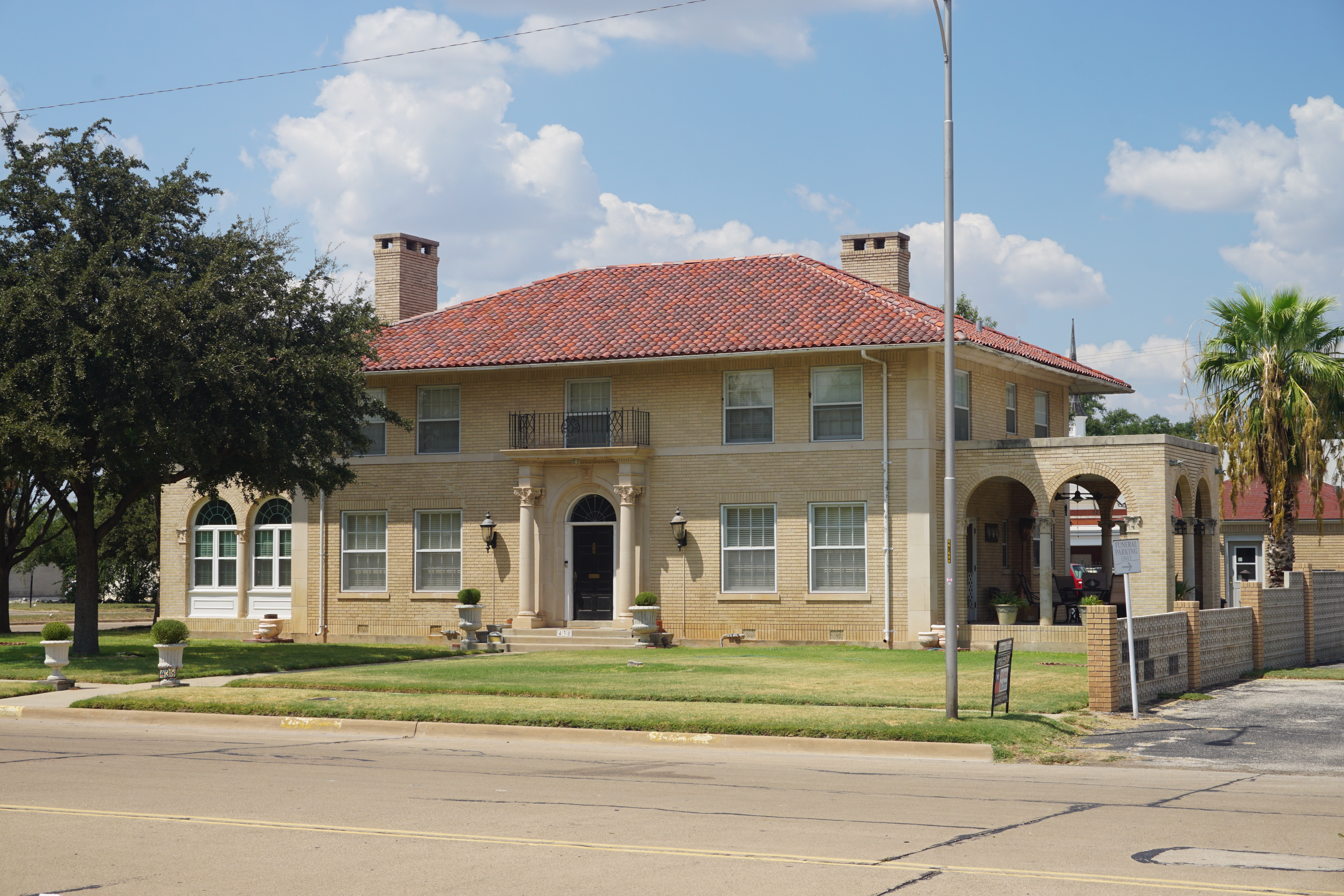
- The J. B. Blakeney House in 2019

- Location within Texas Location within the United States
- Location: 438 W. Twohig, San Angelo, Texas
- Coordinates: 31.45882°N 100.44504°W
- Area: less than one acre
- Built: 1929
- Built by: H. L. McBride
- Architect: Anton Korn and B.M. Morgan
- Architectural style: Eclectic, with Italian Renaissance influence
- MPS: San Angelo MRA
- NRHP reference No.: 88002600
- Added to NRHP: November 25, 1988

The J. B. Blakeney House, at 438 W. Twohig in San Angelo, Texas, is a house designed by architects Anton Korn and B. M. Morgan which was built in 1929. It was listed on the National Register of Historic Places in 1988.

It is a two-story house, with a five-bay main section having a dominant Spanish tile roof, with one-story Roman arcades at each side. It was constructed by builder H.L. McBride.

It is an "attractive" house, eclectic in design, with Italian Renaissance influences.

It was listed on the National Register as part of the San Angelo Multiple Resources study.

It was accepted as a "significant example of eclectic and Italian Renaissance design styles". Architect Anton Korn is also known for his design of the Tom Green County Courthouse, also in San Angelo and included in the same study.

In 1988, it was reported to be in use as a funeral home. 2019 imagery suggests it is a private residence again, while the property behind it, across an alley, is in fact a funeral home.
