= Angelo Heights Historic District =

Historic district in Texas, United States

- U.S. National Register of Historic Places
- Location within Texas Location within the United States
- Location: Roughly bounded by Colorado St., the Concho River, Live Oak St., S. Bishop St., Twohig St., and S. Washington St., San Angelo, Texas
- Coordinates: 31°27′18″N 100°27′21″W
- Area: 34 acres (14 ha)
- Built by: Multiple
- Architect: Multiple
- Architectural style: Late 19th and Early 20th Century American Movements, Late 19th And 20th Century Revivals, Late Victorian
- MPS: San Angelo MRA
- NRHP reference No.: 88002605
- Added to NRHP: November 25, 1988

The Angelo Heights Historic District is a 34 acres (14 ha) historic district in San Angelo, Texas which was listed on the National Register of Historic Places in 1988.

It is a roughly T-shaped district covering parts of 11 blocks. The district included 46 contributing buildings. It is roughly bounded by Colorado St., the Concho River, Live Oak St., S. Bishop St., Twohig St., and S. Washington St.

One building, the house at 309 S. Washington, was moved to its current location in 1930.
