= Museum of the Southwest =

- Fred and Juliette Turner House
- U.S. National Register of Historic Places
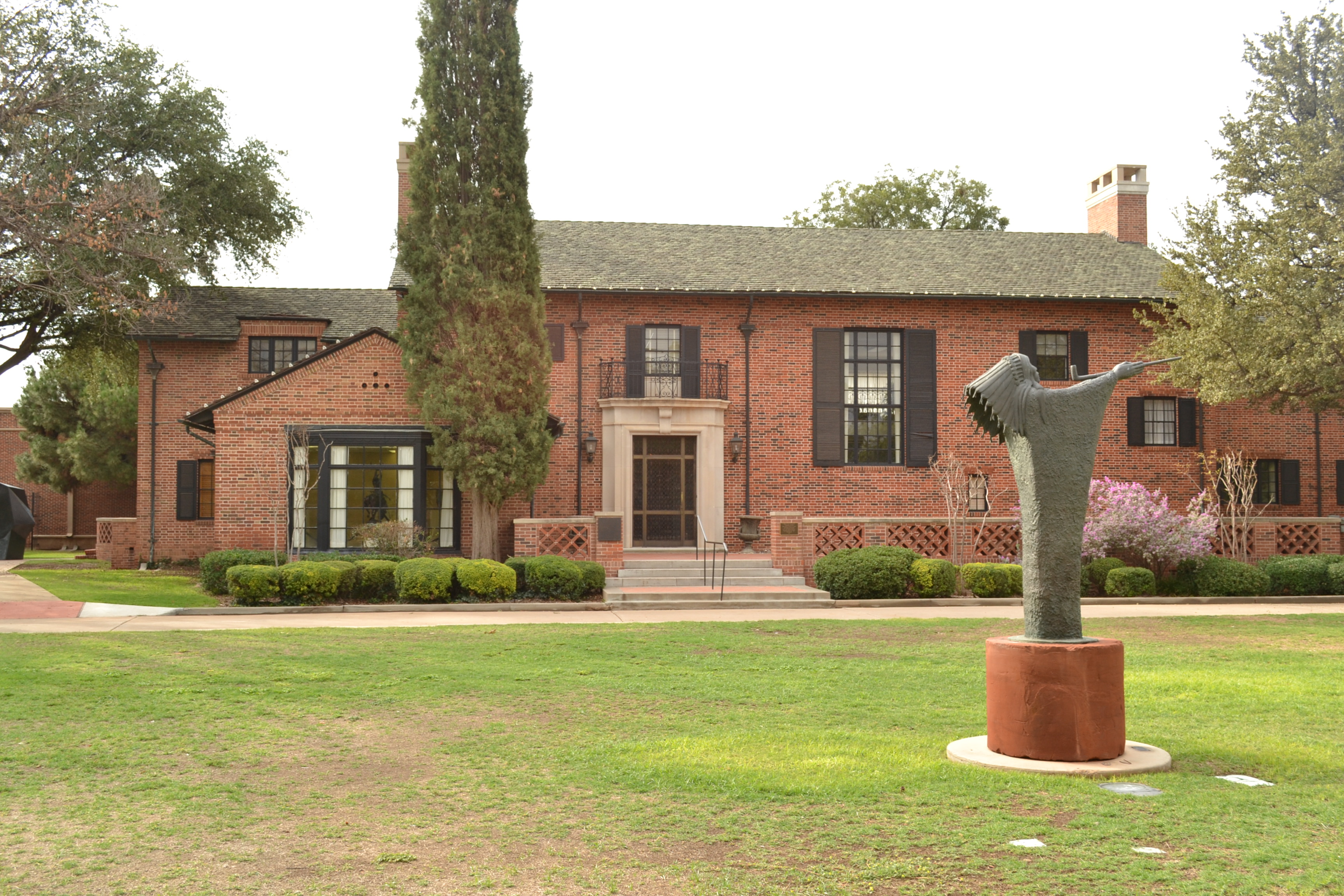

- Location within Texas
- Location: 1705 W. Missouri, Midland, Texas
- Coordinates: 31.9933°N 102.0914°W
- Area: less than one acre
- Built: 1936–1937
- Built by: Anton F. Korn (original); Dav Leonard Construction (1986 gallery addition)
- Architect: Anton F. Korn and Uno Tuomi (original construction); Frank Welch (1970 addition) Ford, Powell & Carson (1986 gallery addition
- NRHP reference No.: 81001148
- Added to NRHP: August 15, 1988

The Museum of the Southwest is a multidisciplinary cultural museum opened in 1966. It displays a selection of prints, paintings, and drawings, as well as the 1959 Kentucky Derby trophy. It also houses the Durham Children's Museum. The museum is situated in a 5,300 sq ft (490 m^{2}) mansion built in 1937 and is listed on the National Register of Historic Places.

== Fred and Juliette Turner House ==
The house was designed by architect Anton F. Korn and was built during 1936–37.

== Exhibitions ==
- Out of Many, One: Portraits of America's Immigrants, January 2022
- Away from the Earth: The Fort Worth Circle of Artists, February 2022
