= Mittel Site =

- U.S. National Register of Historic Places
- Location: Address restricted
- Nearest city: Eldorado, Texas
- NRHP reference No.: 89002278
- Added to NRHP: January 4, 1990

The Mittel Site (41SL15) is a Late Prehistoric archaeological site located near Eldorado in rural Schleicher County, Texas, on the Edwards Plateau. It includes six rock middens that show evidence of burning, as well as several graves inside a natural sinkhole. The site was listed on the National Register of Historic Places in 1990.

== Archaeology ==
The Mittel Site was discovered by a private landowner, who was clearing brush in the area and came across the sinkhole containing human remains. The Texas Archeological Research Laboratory then carried out an archaeological survey between 1988 and 1989. The remains of at least five individuals were identified inside the sinkhole gravesite. Additionally, they found the remains of six burned rock middens and concentrations dotted throughout the site, which they determined to have been used to bake plants, dating to the Middle to Late Archaic period. The burials were found to have been interred sometime after the rock middens were created and date to the Late Prehistoric period, sometime after A.D. 1300.
