= Freeze Building =

- U.S. National Register of Historic Places
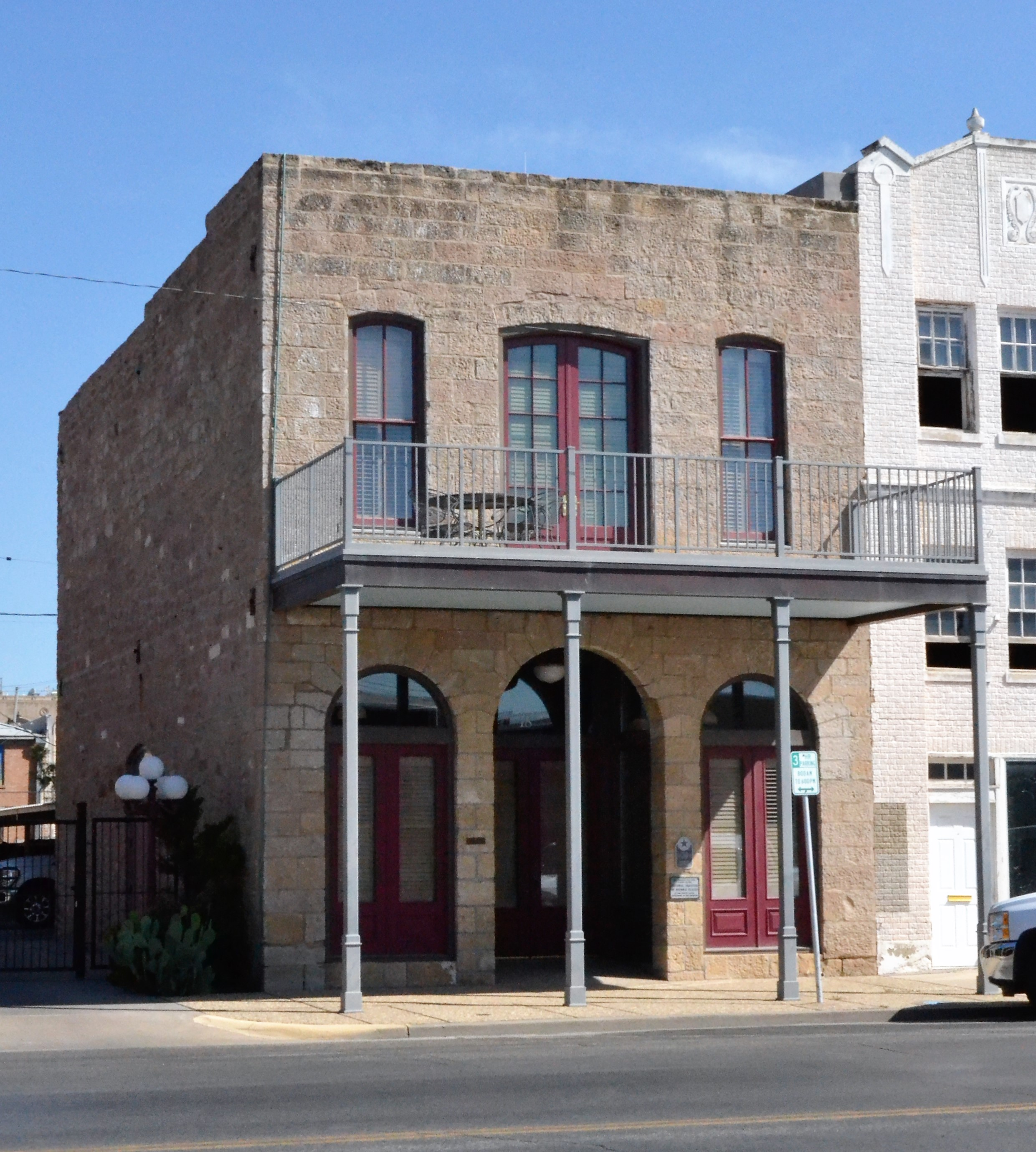
- Location: 18 W. Concho Ave., San Angelo, Texas
- Coordinates: 31°27′36″N 100°26′11″W
- Area: less than one acre
- Built: 1887
- Built by: Carlisle, Jager and Kinney; Freeze, Peter K.
- Architectural style: 2-part commercial block
- MPS: San Angelo MRA
- NRHP reference No.: 97000615
- Added to NRHP: June 20, 1997

The Freeze Building, at 18 W. Concho Ave. in San Angelo, Texas, was built in 1887. It was listed on the National Register of Historic Places in 1997.

It is a two-story two-part commercial block building, constructed of local sandstone. It was first a blacksmith and wheelwright shop. It was built for Peter K. Freeze, a Danish blacksmith.

Freeze had 8 employees by 1888. He started a three-story expansion later, but that was not completed.
