= San Angelo National Bank Building =

- U.S. National Register of Historic Places
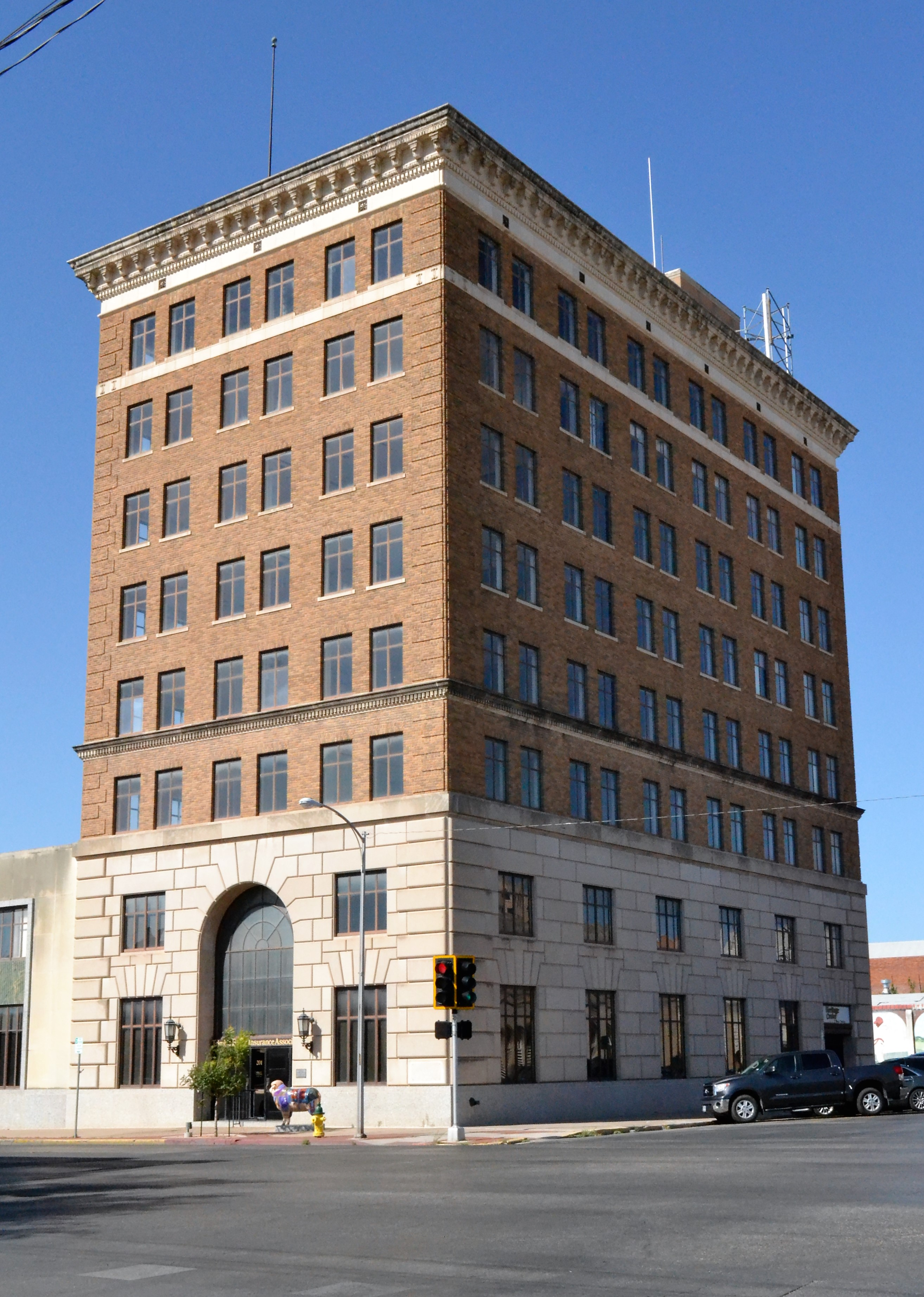
- Building in 2018

- Location within Texas Location within the United States
- Location: 201 S. Chadbourne St., San Angelo, Texas
- Coordinates: 31°27′40″N 100°26′11″W
- Area: less than one acre
- Built: 1927
- Built by: Henger-Chambers Co.
- Architect: Anton F. Korn
- Architectural style: Classical Revival
- NRHP reference No.: 82001740
- Added to NRHP: December 16, 1982

The San Angelo National Bank Building, at 201 S. Chadbourne St. in San Angelo, Texas, was built in 1927. It has also been known as the Trimble-Batier-Cobb Insurance building. It was listed on the National Register of Historic Places in 1982.

It was designed by architect Anton F. Korn and is Classical Revival in style.

It was deemed significant as "one of the most substantial and least-altered buildings in Classical Revival style in West Texas. Over fifty years after its construction, this concrete and masonry structure of eight stories still figures prominently in the San Angelo skyline. The Classical Revival style can be seen on the exterior in the mixture of smooth stones and facing bricks, in the large paired windows spaced to suggest a series of pilasters, and in the cut-stone cornices and perimeter bands. The interior lobby is beautifully decorated with Corinthian columns and Classical Revival detailing."
