= Tom Green County Courthouse =

- U.S. National Register of Historic Places
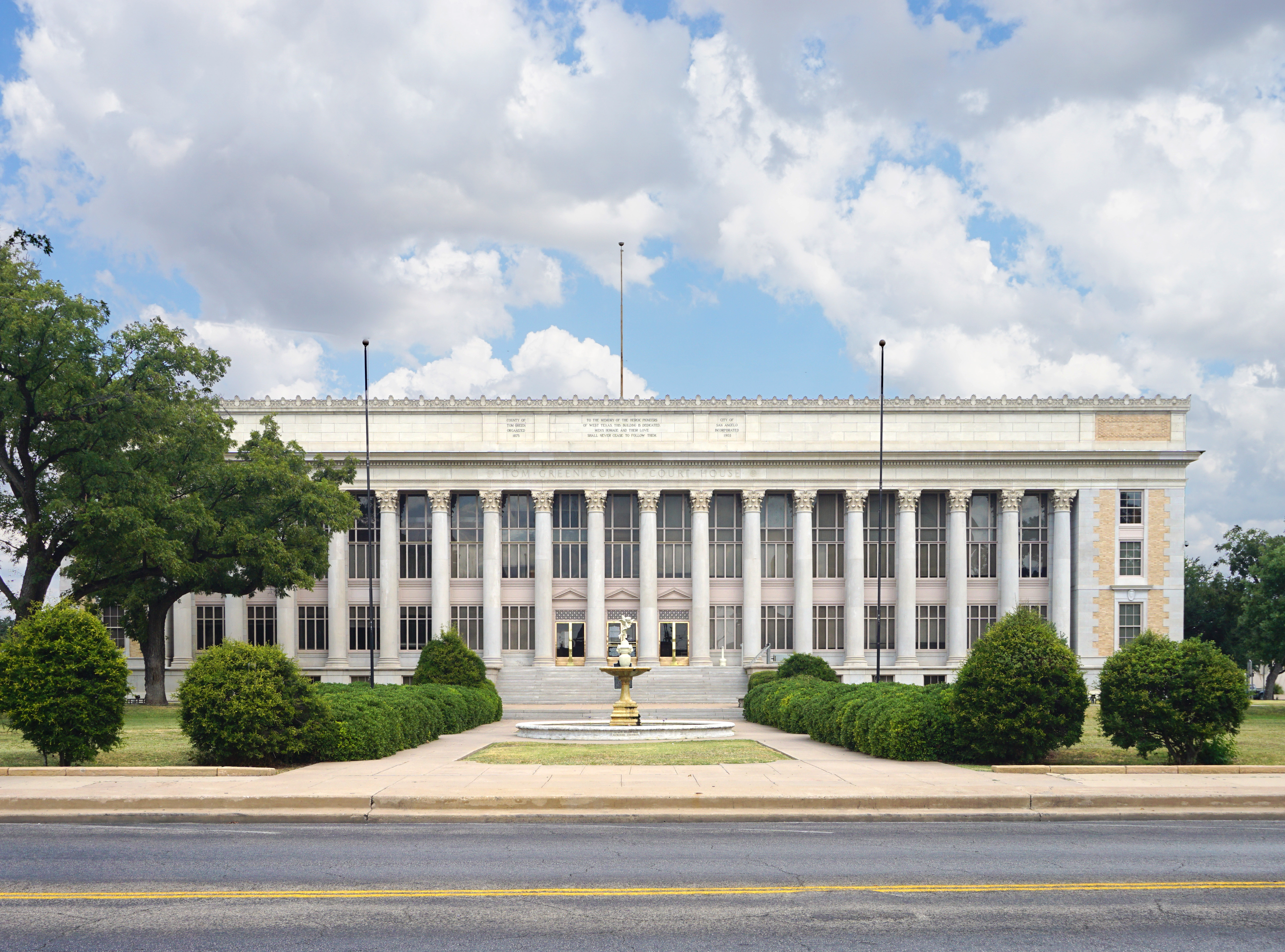
- Tom Green County Courthouse in 2019

- Location within Texas Location within the United States
- Interactive map showing the location of Tom Green County Courthouse
- Location: 100 W. Beauregard Ave., San Angelo, Texas
- Coordinates: 31°27′45″N 100°26′22″W
- Area: less than one acre
- Built: 1928
- Built by: P.O'B. Montgomery
- Architect: Anton Korn
- Architectural style: Classical Revival
- MPS: San Angelo MRA
- NRHP reference No.: 88002555
- Added to NRHP: November 25, 1988

The Tom Green County Courthouse, at 100 W. Beauregard Ave. in San Angelo, Texas, is a Classical Revival courthouse with a monumental Corinthian column colonnades on two facades which was designed by architect Anton Korn and was built in 1928. It was listed on the National Register of Historic Places in 1988.

It has a full entablature and a high roof parapet. A curtain wall of glazed glass behind the columns provides contrast.

It was listed on the National Register as part of the San Angelo Multiple Resources study.

The J. B. Blakeney House, also in San Angelo and designed by Anton Korn, was also listed on the National Register as part of that study.

== See also ==
- National Register of Historic Places listings in Tom Green County, Texas
- List of county courthouses in Texas
