= National Register of Historic Places listings in the Upper East region of Texas =

This is a list of the National Register of Historic Places listings in Texas's Upper East region.

The Upper East region is an area of 23 counties defined by the Texas Comptroller for economic reporting in 2022, as mapped here.

According to the 2020 Census, the Upper East region had a total population of about 1.15 million, or 4 percent of the state’s total population. Twenty percent of the region’s population was concentrated in the Tyler MSA.

The region included 2020 population of 1.15 million, or four percent of Texas' population, with Tyler MSA having 20 percent of the Upper East's population.

To see all locations together in a map, click on "Map all coordinates using OpenSourceMap" at right.

== Anderson County ==
	Name on the Register	Image	Date listed	Location	City or town	Description
1	Anderson Camp Ground	Anderson Camp Ground	December 27, 1982 (#82001735)	W of Brushy Creek on Farm to Market Road 837; 31°57′14″N 95°37′23″W	Brushy Creek	also called Brushy Creek Arbor and United Methodist Church
2	Anderson County Courthouse	Anderson County Courthouse	September 28, 1992 (#92001256)	1 Public Sq. 31°45′54″N 95°37′34″W	Palestine	Recorded Texas Historic Landmark
3	Anderson County Jail	Anderson County Jail	June 11, 1998 (#98000692)	704 Avenue A 31°45′50″N 95°37′36″W	Palestine	Historic and Architectural Resources of Palestine MPS
4	William and Caroline Broyles House	William and Caroline Broyles House	November 10, 1988 (#88002614)	1305 S. Sycamore St. 31°44′52″N 95°37′44″W	Palestine	Recorded Texas Historic Landmark
5	Denby Building	Denby Building	June 11, 1998 (#98000694)	201 W. Crawford St. 31°45′47″N 95°37′56″W	Palestine	Historic and Architectural Resources of Palestine MPS
6	G. E. Dilley Building	G. E. Dilley Building	June 11, 1998 (#98000698)	503 W. Main St. 31°45′44″N 95°38′05″W	Palestine	Historic and Architectural Resources of Palestine MPS
7	First Presbyterian Church	First Presbyterian Church	June 11, 1998 (#98000695)	406 Avenue A 31°45′45″N 95°37′44″W	Palestine	Recorded Texas Historic Landmark; Historic and Architectural Resources of Palestine MPS
8	Freeman Farm	Freeman Farm	June 12, 2000 (#00000656)	Co. Rd. 323, 3 miles SE of Frankston; 31°59′38″N 95°29′53″W	Frankston	also called Kickapoo Farm, Freeman Plantation
9	Gatewood-Shelton Gin	Gatewood-Shelton Gin	June 3, 1998 (#98000637)	304 E. Crawford; 31°45′50″N 95°37′41″W	Palestine	Historic and Architectural Resources of Palestine MPS
10	Howard House	Howard House	March 14, 1993 (#93000072)	1011 N. Perry St. 31°46′11″N 95°37′34″W	Palestine	Recorded Texas Historic Landmark; part of the North Side Historic District
11	Lincoln High School		June 3, 1998 (#98000636)	920 W. Swantz St. 31°45′20″N 95°38′26″W	Palestine	Historic and Architectural Resources of Palestine MPS; burned in 1999, demolished.
12	Link House	Link House	May 29, 1980 (#80004073)	925 N. Link St. 31°46′06″N 95°37′46″W	Palestine	Part of the North Side Historic District; also called Link-Bunton House
13	Michaux Park Historic District	Michaux Park Historic District	April 28, 2004 (#04000380)	Roughly bounded by S. Micheaux St., Jolly St., Crokett Rd., Rogers St., and E Park Ave. 31°45′16″N 95°37′32″W	Palestine	Historic and Architectural Resources of Palestine MPS
14	Mount Vernon African Methodist Episcopal Church	Mount Vernon African Methodist Episcopal Church	June 3, 1998 (#98000635)	913 E. Calhoun St. 31°46′05″N 95°37′22″W	Palestine	Recorded Texas Historic Landmark; Historic and Architectural Resources of Palestine MPS
15	North Side Historic District	North Side Historic District	July 1, 1998 (#98000825)	Roughly bounded by Kolsted, N. Perry, W. Green, and N. Conrad Sts. 31°46′07″N 95°37′53″W	Palestine	Includes Recorded Texas Historic Landmarks; Historic and Architectural Resources of Palestine MPS
16	Old Town Residential Historic District	Old Town Residential Historic District	June 15, 2006 (#06000509)	Roughly surrounded by Lacey St. 31°46′02″N 95°37′22″W	Palestine	
17	Pace McDonald Site	Pace McDonald Site	August 12, 1982 (#82004488)	Address restricted	Palestine	Smithsonian trinomial 41AN51
18	Palestine Carnegie Library	Palestine Carnegie Library	October 17, 1988 (#88001944)	502 N. Queen St. 31°45′48″N 95°38′04″W	Palestine	Recorded Texas Historic Landmark
19	Palestine High School	Palestine High School	September 24, 1986 (#86002295)	400 Micheaux Ave. 31°45′29″N 95°37′38″W	Palestine	Recorded Texas Historic Landmark; currently the Museum for East Texas Culture
20	Palestine New Town Commercial Historic District	Palestine New Town Commercial Historic District	October 6, 2021 (#100007058)	Roughly bounded by North Queen, Crawford, North Houston, and Spring Sts. 31°45′44″N 95°37′57″W	Palestine	
21	Post Office-Palestine	Post Office-Palestine	June 11, 1998 (#98000693)	101 E. Oak St. 31°45′46″N 95°37′52″W	Palestine	Historic and Architectural Resources of Palestine MPS
22	John H Reagan Monument	John H Reagan Monument	June 3, 1998 (#98000633)	Reagan Park; vicinity of Park and Crockett Sts. 31°45′28″N 95°37′31″W	Palestine	Historic and Architectural Resources of Palestine MPS
23	Redlands Hotel	Redlands Hotel	June 3, 1998 (#98000634)	400 N. Queen St. 31°45′46″N 95°38′04″W	Palestine	Historic and Architectural Resources of Palestine MPS
24	Robinson Bank Building	Robinson Bank Building	June 11, 1998 (#98000691)	213 W. Main St. 31°45′44″N 95°37′58″W	Palestine	Historic and Architectural Resources of Palestine MPS
25	Sacred Heart Catholic Church and School	Sacred Heart Catholic Church and School	December 6, 1979 (#79002909)	503 N. Queen St. 31°45′45″N 95°38′04″W	Palestine	Recorded Texas Historic Landmark
26	A. C. Saunders Site	A. C. Saunders Site	July 15, 1982 (#82004487)	Address restricted	Frankston	Smithsonian trinomial 41AN19
27	South Side Historic District	South Side Historic District	July 1, 1998 (#98000826)	Roughly bounded by W. Colorado, and S. Michaux Sts., and Union Pacific Railroad Tracks; 31°45′21″N 95°37′50″W	Palestine	Includes Recorded Texas Historic Landmarks; Historic and Architectural Resources of Palestine MPS
28	Texas & Pacific Steam Locomotive No. 610	Texas & Pacific Steam Locomotive No. 610	March 25, 1977 (#77001477)	Park Road 70; 31°44′28″N 95°34′16″W	Palestine	

== Bowie County ==
	Name on the Register	Image	Date listed	Location	City or town	Description
1	Bowie County Jail	Bowie County Jail	November 16, 1977 (#77001429)	Public Sq. 33°26′32″N 94°25′18″W	Boston	Part of a State Antiquities Landmark
2	Draughon-Moore House	Draughon-Moore House	June 29, 1976 (#76002007)	420 Pine St. 33°25′27″N 94°02′39″W	Texarkana	Recorded Texas Historic Landmark
3	Earl-Rochelle House	Earl-Rochelle House	July 1, 1999 (#99000720)	1920 Magnolia St. 33°26′08″N 94°02′37″W	Texarkana	Recorded Texas Historic Landmark
4	Garland Community School Teacherage		March 6, 2002 (#02000146)	Farm to Market Road 1701, 2.5 mi. W of Dekalb; 33°30′58″N 94°40′11″W	DeKalb	Historic and Architectural Resources Associated with the Rosenwald School Program in Texas
5	Hotel Grim	Hotel Grim	June 7, 2016 (#16000348)	301 N. State Line Ave. 33°25′21″N 94°02′36″W	Texarkana	
6	Hotel McCartney	Hotel McCartney	September 6, 1979 (#79002920)	Corner of Front and Main Streets; 33°25′13″N 94°02′35″W	Texarkana	
7	Offenhauser Insurance Building	Offenhauser Insurance Building	February 25, 1971 (#71000922)	State Line Ave. and 3rd St. 33°25′20″N 94°02′36″W	Texarkana	Recorded Texas Historic Landmark
8	Rialto Building	Rialto Building	June 17, 1982 (#82004493)	317 State Line Ave. 33°25′24″N 94°02′36″W	Texarkana	Recorded Texas Historic Landmark
9	Roseborough Lake Site		July 6, 1976 (#76002008)	Address restricted	Texarkana	
10	Saenger Theater	Saenger Theater	July 12, 1978 (#78002897)	219 Main St. 33°25′18″N 94°02′41″W	Texarkana	State Antiquities Landmark, Recorded Texas Historic Landmark
11	Texarkana Junior College and Texas High School	Texarkana Junior College and Texas High School	March 31, 2014 (#14000102)	W. 16th & Pine Sts. 33°26′02″N 94°03′04″W	Texarkana	
12	Texarkana National Bank	Texarkana National Bank	April 21, 2021 (#100006403)	100 East Broad St. 33°25′17″N 94°02′35″W	Texarkana	
13	Texarkana National Bank (Motor Bank and Parking Garage)		April 21, 2021 (#100006491)	217 Pine St. 33°25′19″N 94°02′37″W	Texarkana	
14	Texarkana Phase Archeological District		August 14, 1973 (#73001959)	Address restricted	Texarkana	
15	Texarkana Union Station	Texarkana Union Station	November 19, 1978 (#78000611)	State Line and Front St. 33°25′12″N 94°02′33″W	Texarkana	Extends into Miller County, Arkansas
16	Texarkana US Post Office and Courthouse	Texarkana US Post Office and Courthouse	March 24, 2000 (#00000245)	5th St. and State Line Ave. 33°25′32″N 94°02′35″W	Texarkana	Recorded Texas Historic Landmark; extends into Miller County, Arkansas
17	Tilson Mounds-Summerhill Lake Place (41BW14)		January 16, 1987 (#86003637)	Bowie County 2320 and Cabe Rd.	Texarkana	
18	Whitaker House	Whitaker House	November 7, 1979 (#79002921)	517 Whitaker St. 33°25′19″N 94°03′25″W	Texarkana	Recorded Texas Historic Landmark

== Camp County ==
	Name on the Register	Image	Date listed	Location	City or town	Description
1	Pittsburg Commercial Historic District	Pittsburg Commercial Historic District	April 16, 2013 (#13000175)	Along Marshall, Quitman, Jefferson, Church, and College Sts, roughly from Cypress St. to North St. 32°59′47″N 94°58′00″W	Pittsburg	Includes Recorded Texas Historic Landmarks

== Cass County ==
	Name on the Register	Image	Date listed	Location	City or town	Description
1	Cass County Courthouse	Cass County Courthouse	May 25, 1979 (#79002924)	Public Sq. 33°00′40″N 94°21′54″W	Linden	State Antiquities Landmark, Recorded Texas Historic Landmark
2	Mathews-Powell House	Mathews-Powell House	September 22, 1977 (#77001431)	Miller St. 33°08′59″N 94°08′50″W	Queen City	Recorded Texas Historic Landmark
3	Pleasant Hill School	Pleasant Hill School	August 20, 2004 (#04000891)	2722 FM 1399; 33°03′11″N 94°23′46″W	Linden	Recorded Texas Historic Landmark

== Delta County ==
(has no NRHP listings)

== Franklin County ==
	Name on the Register	Image	Date listed	Location	City or town	Description
1	M.L. Edwards & Co. Building	M.L. Edwards & Co. Building	August 29, 2018 (#100002840)	103 N Kaufman St. 33°11′20″N 95°13′19″W	Mount Vernon	
2	Franklin County Courthouse and Jail	Franklin County Courthouse and Jail	January 18, 2006 (#05001542)	200 N Kaufman St. 33°11′21″N 95°13′16″W	Mount Vernon	State Antiquities Landmark
3	Mount Vernon Downtown Historic District	Mount Vernon Downtown Historic District	November 21, 2018 (#100003140)	Roughly bounded by RR tracks, Jackson, Taylor & Holbrook Sts; 33°11′19″N 95°13′18″W	Mount Vernon	State Antiquities Landmark
4	Rogers-Drummond House		September 8, 1980 (#80004120)	SE of Mount Vernon; 33°07′06″N 95°09′11″W	Mount Vernon	Recorded Texas Historic Landmark

== Gregg County ==
	Name on the Register	Image	Date listed	Location	City or town	Description
1	Everett Building	Everett Building	November 15, 1979 (#79002948)	214-216 Fredonia St. 32°29′43″N 94°44′19″W	Longview	Recorded Texas Historic Landmark
2	Greggton Commercial Historic District		April 16, 2024 (#100010239)	Bounded by West Marshall Avenue/US Highway 80 to the south, North Supply Street to the west, West Aztec Alley to the north, and Pine Tree Road to the east 32°30′27″N 94°47′42″W	Longview	
3	Longview National Bank		August 1, 2023 (#100009217)	213 North Fredonia St. 32°29′44″N 94°44′19″W	Longview	
4	McWilliams Building	McWilliams Building	March 25, 2019 (#100003536)	208 N. Green St. 32°29′42″N 94°44′12″W	Longview	
5	Northcutt House	Northcutt House	May 22, 1978 (#78002938)	313 S. Fredonia St. 32°29′29″N 94°44′27″W	Longview	Recorded Texas Historic Landmark
6	Nuggett Hill Historic District		May 1, 1998 (#98000403)	Roughly bounded by W. Marshall, N. 6th, Padon, and Teague Sts. 32°30′06″N 94°43′35″W	Longview	
7	Petroleum Building	Petroleum Building	March 6, 2019 (#100003494)	202 E. Whaley St. 32°29′48″N 94°44′15″W	Longview	
8	Frank Taylor and Kate Womack Rembert House	Frank Taylor and Kate Womack Rembert House	December 30, 2011 (#11000980)	316 S. Fredonia St. 32°29′28″N 94°44′24″W	Longview	Recorded Texas Historic Landmark
9	Whaley House	Whaley House	May 23, 1980 (#80004122)	101 E. Whaley St. 32°29′51″N 94°44′18″W	Longview	Recorded Texas Historic Landmark

== Harrison County ==
	Name on the Register	Image	Date listed	Location	City or town	Description
1	Arnot House	Arnot House	July 27, 1979 (#79002970)	306 W. Houston St; 32°32′41″N 94°22′10″W	Marshall	Recorded Texas Historic Landmark
2	Dial-Williamson House	Dial-Williamson House	March 2, 1979 (#79002971)	3 mi (4.8 km) W of Marshall on Old Longview Rd. 32°33′04″N 94°25′19″W	Marshall	Recorded Texas Historic Landmark
3	Edgemont	Edgemont	September 22, 1977 (#77001449)	W of Marshall; 32°31′58″N 94°25′10″W	Marshall	Recorded Texas Historic Landmark
4	First Methodist Church	First Methodist Church	July 16, 1980 (#80004133)	300 E. Houston St. 32°32′42″N 94°21′55″W	Marshall	Recorded Texas Historic Landmark. Destroyed by fire December 9, 2024
5	Fry-Barry House	Fry-Barry House	November 21, 1978 (#78002950)	314 W. Austin; 32°32′44″N 94°22′11″W	Marshall	Recorded Texas Historic Landmark
6	Ginocchio Historic District	Ginocchio Historic District	December 31, 1974 (#74002076)	Bounded by Grand Ave., and N. Franklin, Willow, and Lake Sts. 32°33′05″N 94°21′57″W	Marshall	Includes Recorded Texas Historic Landmarks
7	Hagerty House	Hagerty House	September 13, 1978 (#78002951)	505 E. Rusk St. 32°32′49″N 94°21′43″W	Marshall	Recorded Texas Historic Landmark
8	Harrison County Courthouse	Harrison County Courthouse	August 16, 1977 (#77001450)	Public Square; 32°32′41″N 94°22′01″W	Marshall	State Antiquities Landmark, Recorded Texas Historic Landmark
9	Hochwald House	Hochwald House	July 14, 1983 (#83004487)	211 W. Grand Ave. 32°32′55″N 94°22′06″W	Marshall	Recorded Texas Historic Landmark
10	Locust Grove	Locust Grove	June 20, 1979 (#79002969)	Off TX 134; 32°32′26″N 94°40′57″W	Jonesville	
11	Marshall Arsenal, CSA	Marshall Arsenal, CSA	July 1, 1976 (#76002040)	Address restricted	Marshall	
12	Marshall US Post Office	Marshall US Post Office	April 25, 2001 (#01000435)	100 E. Houston St. 32°32′39″N 94°22′03″W	Marshall	
13	Mimosa Hall	Mimosa Hall	November 2, 1978 (#78002949)	S of Leigh off SR 134; 32°35′19″N 94°08′37″W	Leigh	
14	Old Pierce House	Old Pierce House	April 13, 1973 (#73001965)	303 N. Columbus St. 32°32′49″N 94°21′53″W	Marshall	Recorded Texas Historic Landmark
15	Starr House	Starr House	December 11, 1979 (#79002972)	407 W. Travis St. 32°32′31″N 94°22′13″W	Marshall	State Historic Site, State Antiquities Landmark, Recorded Texas Historic Landmark
16	John R. Stinson House	John R. Stinson House	November 7, 1979 (#79002973)	313 W. Austin St. 32°32′45″N 94°22′12″W	Marshall	Recorded Texas Historic Landmark
17	James Turner House	James Turner House	November 7, 1979 (#79002974)	406 S. Washington Ave. 32°32′31″N 94°22′01″W	Marshall	Recorded Texas Historic Landmark
18	Weisman-Hirsch House	Weisman-Hirsch House	July 7, 1983 (#83004488)	313 S. Washington St. 32°32′33″N 94°22′03″W	Marshall	Recorded Texas Historic Landmark

== Henderson County ==
	Name on the Register	Image	Date listed	Location	City or town	Description
1	Faulk and Gauntt Building	Faulk and Gauntt Building	June 9, 1980 (#80004135)	217 N. Prairieville St. 32°12′21″N 95°51′19″W	Athens	Recorded Texas Historic Landmark

== Hopkins County ==
	Name on the Register	Image	Date listed	Location	City or town	Description
1	Hopkins County Courthouse	Hopkins County Courthouse	April 11, 1977 (#77001453)	Church and Jefferson Sts. 33°08′18″N 95°36′02″W	Sulphur Springs	State Antiquities Landmark, Recorded Texas Historic Landmark

== Lamar County ==
	Name on the Register	Image	Date listed	Location	City or town	Description
1	Atkinson-Morris House	Atkinson-Morris House	October 26, 1988 (#88001914)	802 Fitzhugh; 33°40′07″N 95°32′49″W	Paris	Recorded Texas Historic Landmark; Historic Resources of Paris MRA
2	Bailey-Ragland House	Bailey-Ragland House	October 26, 1988 (#88001917)	433 W. Washington; 33°39′15″N 95°33′39″W	Paris	Historic Resources of Paris MRA
3	Benjamin and Adelaide Baldwin House		October 26, 1988 (#88001925)	714 Graham; 33°39′50″N 95°33′48″W	Paris	Historic Resources of Paris MRA; demolished in 2014
4	Baty-Plummer House	Baty-Plummer House	October 26, 1988 (#88001931)	708 Sherman; 33°39′27″N 95°33′48″W	Paris	Historic Resources of Paris MRA
5	Thomas and Bettie Brazelton House	Thomas and Bettie Brazelton House	October 26, 1988 (#88001932)	801 W. Sherman; 33°39′26″N 95°33′50″W	Paris	Historic Resources of Paris MRA
6	Carlton-Gladden House	Carlton-Gladden House	October 26, 1988 (#88001933)	2120 Bonham; 33°39′39″N 95°34′15″W	Paris	Historic Resources of Paris MRA
7	Church Street Historic District	Church Street Historic District	October 26, 1988 (#88001936)	Roughly bounded by E. Austin, 3rd, SE, Washington and 1st, SW Sts. 33°39′25″N 95°33′19″W	Paris	Includes State Historic Site, State Antiquities Landmark, Recorded Texas Historic Landmarks; Historic Resources of Paris MRA
8	J. M. and Emily Daniel House	J. M. and Emily Daniel House	October 26, 1988 (#88001921)	216 4th Street SW; 33°39′34″N 95°33′38″W	Paris	Historic Resources of Paris MRA
9	Ellis II Site	Ellis II Site	March 30, 1978 (#78002967)	Address restricted	Pin Hook	
10	Emerson Site	Emerson Site	December 1, 1978 (#78002968)	Address restricted	Pin Hook	
11	First Church of Christ, Scientist	First Church of Christ, Scientist	October 26, 1988 (#88001912)	339 W. Kaufman; 33°39′35″N 95°33′35″W	Paris	Classical Revival former Christian Scientist church built in 1917 after Paris' 1916 fire. Included in Historic Resources of Paris MRA.
12	First Presbyterian Church	First Presbyterian Church	October 26, 1988 (#88001913)	410 W. Kaufman; 33°39′36″N 95°33′37″W	Paris	Recorded Texas Historic Landmark; Historic Resources of Paris MRA
13	First United Methodist Church	First United Methodist Church	June 21, 1983 (#83003146)	322 Lamar St. 33°39′40″N 95°33′12″W	Paris	Churches with Decorative Interior Painting TR
14	John Chisum Gibbons House	John Chisum Gibbons House	October 26, 1988 (#88001923)	623 6th Street SE; 33°39′21″N 95°33′00″W	Paris	Historic Resources of Paris MRA
15	High House		October 26, 1988 (#88001920)	352 West Washington; 33°39′16″N 95°33′36″W	Paris	Historic Resources of Paris MRA
16	House at 705 3rd Street, SE		October 26, 1988 (#88001935)	705 3rd St., SE; 33°39′19″N 95°33′13″W	Paris	Historic Resources of Paris MRA
17	Edwin and Mary Jenkins House	Edwin and Mary Jenkins House	October 26, 1988 (#88001927)	549 5th, NW; 33°39′58″N 95°33′40″W	Paris	Historic Resources of Paris MRA
18	Johnson-McCuistion House	Johnson-McCuistion House	October 26, 1988 (#88001911)	730 Clarksville; 33°39′36″N 95°32′56″W	Paris	Recorded Texas Historic Landmark; Historic Resources of Paris MRA
19	Lamar County Hospital	Lamar County Hospital	October 26, 1988 (#88001918)	625 W. Washington; 33°39′14″N 95°33′45″W	Paris	Historic Resources of Paris MRA
20	William and Etta Latimer House		October 26, 1988 (#88001930)	707 Sherman; 33°39′26″N 95°33′48″W	Paris	Historic Resources of Paris MRA
21	Loma Alto Site	Loma Alto Site	March 29, 1978 (#78002969)	Address restricted	Pin Hook	
22	A. C. Mackin Archeological Site	A. C. Mackin Archeological Site	May 16, 1974 (#74002085)	Address restricted	Faulkner	
23	Samuel Bell Maxey House	Samuel Bell Maxey House	March 18, 1971 (#71000943)	812 E. Church St. 33°39′14″N 95°33′17″W	Paris	State Historic Site, State Antiquities Landmark, Recorded Texas Historic Landmark; part of Church Street Historic District
24	McCormic-Bishop House	McCormic-Bishop House	October 26, 1988 (#88001910)	603 8th St., SE; 33°39′22″N 95°32′53″W	Paris	Historic Resources of Paris MRA
25	Means-Justiss House		October 26, 1988 (#88001934)	537 6th St., SE; 33°39′24″N 95°33′01″W	Paris	Historic Resources of Paris MRA
26	Morris-Moore House	Morris-Moore House	October 26, 1988 (#88001926)	744 3rd St, NW; 33°40′05″N 95°33′32″W	Paris	Historic Resources of Paris MRA
27	Mt. Canaan Baptist Church		July 23, 2024 (#100010581)	60 Sycamore St. 33°38′55″N 95°33′20″W	Paris	
28	Paris Commercial Historic District	Paris Commercial Historic District	December 22, 1988 (#88001937)	Roughly bounded by Price, 3rd, SE, Sherman and 4th, SW; 33°39′40″N 95°33′24″W	Paris	Includes State Antiquities Landmarks, Recorded Texas Historic Landmarks; Historic Resources of Paris MRA; a boundary increase was approved June 19, 2017.
29	Pine Bluff-Fitzhugh Historic District		October 26, 1988 (#88001938)	500-900 blocks of Pine Bluff and 300-600 blocks of Fitzhugh; 33°39′50″N 95°32′51″W	Paris	Historic Resources of Paris MRA
30	Thaddeus and Josepha Preston House	Thaddeus and Josepha Preston House	October 26, 1988 (#88001915)	731 E. Austin; 33°39′32″N 95°32′56″W	Paris	Historic Resources of Paris MRA
31	Ragland House	Ragland House	October 26, 1988 (#88001922)	208 5th St., SW; 33°39′35″N 95°33′41″W	Paris	Historic Resources of Paris MRA
32	Rodgers-Wade Furniture Company	Rodgers-Wade Furniture Company	October 26, 1988 (#88001919)	401 3rd Street SW; 33°39′29″N 95°33′31″W	Paris	Historic Resources of Paris MRA
33	Santa Fe-Frisco Depot	Santa Fe-Frisco Depot	August 20, 1998 (#88001939)	1100 W. Kaufman; 33°39′35″N 95°34′01″W	Paris	Recorded Texas Historic Landmark; Historic Resources of Paris MRA
34	Scott-Roden Mansion	Scott-Roden Mansion	September 15, 1983 (#83003147)	425 S. Church St. 33°39′27″N 95°33′15″W	Paris	Recorded Texas Historic Landmark; part of Church Street Historic District
35	St. Paul's Baptist Church	St. Paul's Baptist Church	October 26, 1988 (#88001928)	454 2nd, NE; 33°39′58″N 95°33′15″W	Paris	Historic Resources of Paris MRA
36	State Highway 5 Bridge at High Creek		October 10, 1996 (#96001102)	FM 1509, 1.8 mi (2.9 km). W of jct. with FM 38; 33°36′43″N 95°44′50″W	Brookston	Historic Bridges of Texas, 1866-1945 MPS; Warren pony truss bridge built in 1920, deck replaced with wood in 1935, entire bridge removed and replaced in 2001.
37	State Highway Bridge 5 at Big Pine Creek		October 10, 1996 (#96001103)	FM 1510, 1.4 mi (2.3 km). E of jct. with FM 38; 33°39′39″N 95°40′23″W	Brookston	Historic Bridges of Texas, 1866-1945 MPS; Warren pony truss bridge built in 1920, deck replaced with wood in 1935, entire bridge removed in 2001.
38	Swindle Site	Swindle Site	March 29, 1978 (#78002970)	Address restricted	Pin Hook	
39	W. S. and Mary Trigg House	W. S. and Mary Trigg House	October 26, 1988 (#88001924)	441 12th St., SE; 33°39′26″N 95°32′37″W	Paris	Historic Resources of Paris MRA
40	Wise-Fielding House and Carriage House	Wise-Fielding House and Carriage House	December 22, 1988 (#88001916)	418 W. Washington; 33°39′17″N 95°33′39″W	Paris	Historic Resources of Paris MRA
41	Edgar and Annie Wright House	Edgar and Annie Wright House	October 26, 1988 (#88001929)	857 Lamar; 33°39′41″N 95°32′50″W	Paris	Historic Resources of Paris MRA

== Marion County ==
	Name on the Register	Image	Date listed	Location	City or town	Description
1	Alley-Carlson House	Alley-Carlson House	October 28, 1969 (#69000206)	501 Walker St. 32°45′34″N 94°21′00″W	Jefferson	Recorded Texas Historic Landmark; part of Jefferson Historic District
2	Birge-Beard House	Birge-Beard House	August 25, 1970 (#70000754)	212 N. Vale St. 32°45′27″N 94°20′46″W	Jefferson	Recorded Texas Historic Landmark; part of Jefferson Historic District
3	Epperson-McNutt House	Epperson-McNutt House	October 28, 1969 (#69000207)	409 S. Alley St. 32°45′27″N 94°21′06″W	Jefferson	Recorded Texas Historic Landmark; part of Jefferson Historic District
4	Excelsior Hotel	Excelsior Hotel	October 28, 1969 (#69000208)	Austin St., between Market and Vale Sts. 32°45′21″N 94°20′44″W	Jefferson	Recorded Texas Historic Landmark; part of Jefferson Historic District
5	Freeman Plantation House	Freeman Plantation House	November 25, 1969 (#69000209)	0.8 mi (1.3 km). west of Jefferson on TX 49; 32°45′48″N 94°22′12″W	Jefferson	Recorded Texas Historic Landmark
6	Hodge-Taylor House	Hodge-Taylor House	March 21, 1997 (#97000259)	Approximately 1 mi (1.6 km) southwest of junction of US 59 and TX 49, W. 32°45′54″N 94°22′20″W	Jefferson	
7	Jefferson Historic District	Jefferson Historic District	March 31, 1971 (#71000949)	Roughly bounded by Owens, Dixon, Walnut, Camp, and Taylor Sts. 32°45′21″N 94°20′46″W	Jefferson	Includes State Antiquities Landmark, Recorded Texas Historic Landmarks
8	Jefferson Ordnance Magazine	Jefferson Ordnance Magazine	February 17, 1995 (#95000102)	0.3 mi (0.48 km) northeast of US 59B crossing of Big Cypress Bayou; 32°45′29″N 94°20′18″W	Jefferson	Recorded Texas Historic Landmark
9	Jefferson Playhouse	Jefferson Playhouse	October 28, 1969 (#69000374)	Northwest corner of Market and Henderson Sts. 32°45′25″N 94°20′51″W	Jefferson	Recorded Texas Historic Landmark; part of Jefferson Historic District
10	The Magnolias	The Magnolias	March 31, 1971 (#71000951)	209 E. Broadway; 32°45′42″N 94°21′10″W	Jefferson	Recorded Texas Historic Landmark
11	Old U.S. Post Office and Courts Building	Old U.S. Post Office and Courts Building	October 28, 1969 (#69000210)	223 W. Austin St. 32°45′20″N 94°20′45″W	Jefferson	Recorded Texas Historic Landmark; part of Jefferson Historic District
12	Capt. William Perry House	Capt. William Perry House	August 25, 1970 (#70000755)	Northwest corner of Walnut and Clarksville Sts. 32°45′38″N 94°20′49″W	Jefferson	Recorded Texas Historic Landmark
13	Planters Bank Building	Planters Bank Building	March 11, 1971 (#71000952)	224 E. Austin St. 32°45′26″N 94°20′42″W	Jefferson	Recorded Texas Historic Landmark; part of Jefferson Historic District
14	Presbyterian Manse	Presbyterian Manse	October 28, 1969 (#69000211)	Northeast corner of Alley and Delta Sts. 32°45′27″N 94°21′03″W	Jefferson	Recorded Texas Historic Landmark; part of Jefferson Historic District
15	Sedberry House	Sedberry House	August 25, 1970 (#70000756)	211 N. Market St. 32°45′24″N 94°20′51″W	Jefferson	Recorded Texas Historic Landmark; part of Jefferson Historic District
16	Capt. William E. Singleton House	Capt. William E. Singleton House	August 25, 1970 (#70000757)	204 N. Soda St. 32°45′37″N 94°21′21″W	Jefferson	Recorded Texas Historic Landmark
17	Stilley-Young House	Stilley-Young House	September 28, 2005 (#05001105)	405 Moseley St. 32°45′22″N 94°21′05″W	Jefferson	Recorded Texas Historic Landmark; State Antiquities Landmark
18	Perry M. Woods House	Perry M. Woods House	March 31, 1971 (#71000953)	502 Walker St. 32°45′33″N 94°21′00″W	Jefferson	Recorded Texas Historic Landmark; part of Jefferson Historic District

== Morris County ==
	Name on the Register	Image	Date listed	Location	City or town	Description
1	Old Morris County Courthouse	Old Morris County Courthouse	December 11, 1979 (#79002997)	101 Linda Dr. 33°01′54″N 94°43′17″W	Daingerfield	State Antiquities Landmark

== Panola County ==
	Name on the Register	Image	Date listed	Location	City or town	Description
1	International Boundary Marker	International Boundary Marker	April 13, 1977 (#77001463)	On Louisiana-Texas border, at intersection of FM 31 and LA 765; 32°02′03″N 94°02′34″W	Deadwood	State Antiquities Landmark, extends into DeSoto Parish, Louisiana
2	Methodist Church Concord	Methodist Church Concord	September 8, 1980 (#80004144)	SE of Carthage off TX 59; 32°00′24″N 94°14′50″W	Carthage	Recorded Texas Historic Landmark
3	Panola County Jail	Panola County Jail	June 29, 1976 (#76002057)	110 N. Shelby St. 32°09′29″N 94°20′20″W	Carthage	State Antiquities Landmark, Recorded Texas Historic Landmark

== Rains County ==
	Name on the Register	Image	Date listed	Location	City or town	Description
1	Gilbert Site	Gilbert Site	April 13, 1977 (#77001469)	Address restricted	Emory	
2	Koons Site	Koons Site	April 13, 1977 (#77001470)	Address restricted	Emory	
3	Rains County Courthouse	Rains County Courthouse	May 1, 2003 (#03000333)	100 E Quitman St. 32°52′28″N 95°45′53″W	Emory	State Antiquities Landmark, Recorded Texas Historic Landmark
4	Yandell Site	Yandell Site	April 13, 1977 (#77001471)	Address restricted	Emory	

== Red River County ==
	Name on the Register	Image	Date listed	Location	City or town	Description
1	Bogata Historic District	Bogata Historic District	September 24, 2020 (#100005602)	Main St., roughly between Mount Pleasant Rd. and 2nd St. 33°28′16″N 95°12′50″W	Bogata	
2	Sam Kaufman Site	Sam Kaufman Site	August 14, 1973 (#73001973)	Address restricted	Blakeney	Also known as the "Kaufman-Williams Site"; one of few prehistoric sites with evidence of osteochondritis dissecans
3	Kiomatia Mounds Archeological District	Kiomatia Mounds Archeological District	January 11, 1974 (#74002089)	Address restricted	Kiomatia	
4	McCarty Site	McCarty Site	December 1, 1978 (#78003377)	Address restricted	Pin Hook	
5	Neely Site 41 RR 48	Neely Site 41 RR 48	August 20, 1982 (#82004520)	Address restricted	Manchester	
6	Red River County Courthouse	Red River County Courthouse	August 31, 1978 (#78002977)	Public Sq. 33°36′47″N 95°03′04″W	Clarksville	State Antiquities Landmark, Recorded Texas Historic Landmark
7	Smathers-Demorse House	Smathers-Demorse House	May 17, 1976 (#76002060)	E. Comanche St. 33°36′46″N 95°02′58″W	Clarksville	Recorded Texas Historic Landmark

== Rusk County ==
	Name on the Register	Image	Date listed	Location	City or town	Description
1	Concord School		September 9, 2024 (#100010801)	19447 FM 95 S 31°56′15″N 94°36′08″W	Mount Enterprise vicinity	
2	Elias and Mattie Crim House	Elias and Mattie Crim House	August 17, 2005 (#05000892)	310 E. Main St. 32°09′10″N 94°47′43″W	Henderson	Recorded Texas Historic Landmark
3	Harmony Hill Site	Harmony Hill Site	May 13, 1976 (#76002062)	Address restricted	Tatum	Smithsonian trinomials 41RK40, 41RK41, 41RK42, 41RK44, 41RK50, 41RK51, 41RK67, 41RK68
4	Henderson Commercial Historic District	Henderson Commercial Historic District	March 10, 1995 (#95000219)	Roughly bounded by Charlevoix, Marshall, Elk and Van Buren Sts. 32°09′10″N 94°47′56″W	Henderson	Includes Recorded Texas Historic Landmark
5	Hudnall-Pirtle Site	Hudnall-Pirtle Site	September 11, 1991 (#91001159)	Address restricted	Easton	Smithsonian trinomial 41RK4
6	Monte Verdi Plantation		March 31, 2014 (#14000104)	11992 Cty. Rd. 4233 W. 31°54′06″N 94°52′15″W	Cushing	Recorded Texas Historic Landmark, includes additional Recorded Texas Historic Landmark
7	Musgano Site	Musgano Site	June 24, 1976 (#76002063)	Address restricted	Tatum	Smithsonian trinomial 41RK19

== Smith County ==
	Name on the Register	Image	Date listed	Location	City or town	Description
1	Azalea Residential Historic District	Azalea Residential Historic District	June 23, 2003 (#03000559)	Roughly bounded by S. Robertson Av., Sunnybrook Dr., Fair Ln., Old Bullard Rd., College Av., W. 4th St., Highland Av.. 32°19′40″N 95°18′06″W	Tyler	Includes Recorded Texas Historic Landmark; Historic and Architectural Resources of Tyler MPS
2	Blackstone Building	Blackstone Building	June 14, 2002 (#02000645)	315 N. Broadway; 32°21′12″N 95°18′02″W	Tyler	Historic and Architectural Resources of Tyler MPS
3	Brick Streets Neighborhood Historic District	Brick Streets Neighborhood Historic District	April 28, 2004 (#04000379)	Roughly bounded by South Broadway, W. Dobbs St., S. Kennedy Ave., S. Vine Ave., Interior Property Lines, S. College Ave. 32°20′33″N 95°18′16″W	Tyler	Includes Recorded Texas Historic Landmarks; Historic and Architectural Resources of Tyler MPS
4	Campbell Building-Union Bus Station		January 19, 2023 (#100008548)	311 North Bois d' Arc Ave. 32°21′05″N 95°18′10″W	Tyler	
5	Carnegie Public Library	Carnegie Public Library	March 26, 1979 (#79003007)	125 S. College St. 32°21′00″N 95°18′07″W	Tyler	State Antiquities Landmark, Recorded Texas Historic Landmark
6	Charnwood Residential Historic District	Charnwood Residential Historic District	August 20, 1999 (#99001023)	Roughly bounded by E Houston, RR tracks, E Wells, S Donnybrook, E Dobbs, and S Broadway; 32°20′28″N 95°17′50″W	Tyler	Includes Recorded Texas Historic Landmark
7	Cotton Belt Building	Cotton Belt Building	December 6, 2005 (#05001405)	1517 W. Front St. 32°20′49″N 95°19′03″W	Tyler	
8	Crescent Laundry	Crescent Laundry	June 14, 2002 (#02000644)	312-320 E. Ferguson St. 32°21′07″N 95°17′51″W	Tyler	Historic and Architectural Resources of Tyler MPS
9	Col. John Dewberry House	Col. John Dewberry House	May 6, 1971 (#71000963)	1 mi (1.6 km). N of Teaselville on FM 346; 32°09′32″N 95°24′17″W	Teaselville	Recorded Texas Historic Landmark
10	Donnybrook Duplex Residential Historic District	Donnybrook Duplex Residential Historic District	June 14, 2002 (#02000649)	Roughly bounded by E. 6th St., Donnybrook Ave., E. 8th St., and S. Wall; 32°19′42″N 95°17′48″W	Tyler	Historic and Architectural Resources of Tyler MPS
11	John B. and Ketura (Kettie) Douglas House	John B. and Ketura (Kettie) Douglas House	January 9, 1997 (#96001565)	318 S. Fannin Ave. 32°20′51″N 95°17′54″W	Tyler	Recorded Texas Historic Landmark
12	East Ferguson Residential Historic District	East Ferguson Residential Historic District	June 14, 2002 (#02000647)	423-513 E. Ferguson St. 32°21′04″N 95°17′45″W	Tyler	Historic and Architectural Resources of Tyler MPS
13	Elks Club Building	Elks Club Building	June 14, 2002 (#02000648)	202 S. Broadway; 32°20′58″N 95°18′01″W	Tyler	Historic and Architectural Resources of Tyler MPS
14	D.R. Glass Library at Texas College	D.R. Glass Library at Texas College	March 7, 2007 (#07000128)	2404 N. Grand Ave. 32°22′25″N 95°18′44″W	Tyler	
15	Goodman-LeGrand House	Goodman-LeGrand House	November 7, 1976 (#76002066)	624 N. Broadway; 32°21′24″N 95°18′05″W	Tyler	State Antiquities Landmark, Recorded Texas Historic Landmark
16	Jenkins-Harvey Super Service Station and Garage	Jenkins-Harvey Super Service Station and Garage	June 14, 2002 (#02000646)	124 S. College; 32°20′59″N 95°18′06″W	Tyler	Historic and Architectural Resources of Tyler MPS
17	Martin Hall at Texas College		December 6, 2005 (#05001404)	2404 N. Grand Ave. 32°22′33″N 95°18′42″W	Tyler	
18	Marvin Methodist Episcopal Church, South	Marvin Methodist Episcopal Church, South	November 15, 2000 (#00001385)	300 W. Erwin St. 32°21′01″N 95°18′11″W	Tyler	Recorded Texas Historic Landmark
19	Mayfair Building		October 18, 2024 (#100010937)	411 Fair Park Drive, Building B 32°20′45″N 95°19′27″W	Tyler	
20	Moore Grocery Co. Building	Moore Grocery Co. Building	September 13, 2002 (#02000991)	408 N. Broadway; 32°21′14″N 95°18′03″W	Tyler	Historic and Architectural Resources of Tyler MPS
21	People's National Bank Building	People's National Bank Building	August 22, 2002 (#02000896)	102 N. College Ave. 32°21′03″N 95°18′06″W	Tyler	Historic and Architectural Resources of Tyler MPS
22	President's House at Texas College		March 7, 2007 (#07000131)	2404 N. Grand Ave. 32°22′27″N 95°18′40″W	Tyler	
23	Ramey House	Ramey House	October 29, 1982 (#82001738)	605 S. Broadway; 32°20′37″N 95°18′04″W	Tyler	Recorded Texas Historic Landmark; part of Brick Streets Neighborhood Historic District
24	Short-Line Residential Historic District	Short-Line Residential Historic District	August 22, 2002 (#02000897)	Roughly bounded by West Ln., N. Ellis, Short St., and an unnamed alley to the east 32°21′14″N 95°18′26″W	Tyler	Historic and Architectural Resources of Tyler MPS
25	Smith County Jail, 1881	Smith County Jail, 1881	August 22, 1996 (#96000937)	309 Erwin St. 32°21′02″N 95°17′53″W	Tyler	Recorded Texas Historic Landmark
26	St. James Colored Methodist Episcopal Church	St. James Colored Methodist Episcopal Church	August 20, 2004 (#04000887)	408 N. Border Ave. 32°21′15″N 95°18′23″W	Tyler	Historic and Architectural Resources of Tyler MPS
27	St. John's AF & AM Lodge	St. John's AF & AM Lodge	December 6, 2005 (#05001403)	323 W. Front St. 32°20′50″N 95°18′14″W	Tyler	
28	St. Louis Southwestern Railway (Cotton Belt) Passenger Depot	St. Louis Southwestern Railway (Cotton Belt) Passenger Depot	August 8, 2001 (#01000873)	100 blk. E. Oakwood St., at N. Spring St. 32°21′17″N 95°17′56″W	Tyler	Historic and Architectural Resources of Tyler MPS
29	Tyler City Hall	Tyler City Hall	March 7, 2007 (#07000129)	212 N. Bonner Ave. 32°21′07″N 95°18′21″W	Tyler	Historic and Architectural Resources of Tyler MPS
30	Tyler Downtown Historic District		October 24, 2022 (#100008283)	Roughly bounded by West Front St., Border Ave., Cotton Belt RR tracks, and Fannin Ave. 32°21′03″N 95°18′03″W	Tyler	
31	Tyler Grocery Company	Tyler Grocery Company	September 14, 2002 (#02000993)	416 N. Broadway; 32°21′15″N 95°18′04″W	Tyler	Historic and Architectural Resources of Tyler MPS
32	Tyler Hydraulic-Fill Dam		August 29, 1977 (#77001543)	W of Tyler off TX 31; 32°19′52″N 95°22′07″W	Tyler	State Antiquities Landmark
33	Tyler Municipal Rose Garden	Tyler Municipal Rose Garden	March 22, 2019 (#100003539)	420 Rose Park Dr. 32°21′07″N 95°18′09″W	Tyler	
34	Tyler US Post Office and Courthouse	Tyler US Post Office and Courthouse	April 25, 2001 (#01000433)	211 W. Ferguson St. 32°21′07″N 95°18′09″W	Tyler	
35	Whitaker-McClendon House	Whitaker-McClendon House	June 2, 1982 (#82004522)	806 W. Houston St. 32°20′36″N 95°18′34″W	Tyler	Recorded Texas Historic Landmark
36	Williams-Anderson House	Williams-Anderson House	September 14, 2002 (#02000995)	1313 W. Claude St. 32°21′09″N 95°18′54″W	Tyler	Historic and Architectural Resources of Tyler MPS

== Titus County ==
	Name on the Register	Image	Date listed	Location	City or town	Description
1	Hale Mound Site	Hale Mound Site	July 7, 1990 (#90000983)	Address restricted	Winfield	Smithsonian trinomial 41TT12

== Upshur County ==
	Name on the Register	Image	Date listed	Location	City or town	Description
1	John and Eva O'Bryne House	John and Eva O'Bryne House	May 6, 2005 (#05000383)	FM 1844, 0.7 mi (1.1 km). east of US 271; 32°35′03″N 94°54′36″W	Union Grove	Recorded Texas Historic Landmark
2	Upshur County Courthouse	Upshur County Courthouse	May 16, 2012 (#12000290)	100 W. Tyler St. 32°43′45″N 94°56′40″W	Gilmer	

== Van Zandt County ==
	Name on the Register	Image	Date listed	Location	City or town	Description
1	William H. and Molly P. Humphries House	William H. and Molly P. Humphries House	August 20, 2004 (#04000890)	201 S. Main St. 32°41′47″N 95°53′11″W	Edgewood	Recorded Texas Historic Landmark
2	Van Zandt County Courthouse	Van Zandt County Courthouse	February 28, 2017 (#100000698)	121 E. Dallas St. 32°33′22″N 95°51′47″W	Canton	Recorded Texas Historic Landmark

== Wood County ==
	Name on the Register	Image	Date listed	Location	City or town	Description
1	Marcus DeWitt Carlock House	Marcus DeWitt Carlock House	May 14, 2013 (#13000277)	407 S. Main St. 32°57′13″N 95°17′29″W	Winnsboro	Recorded Texas Historic Landmark
2	George W. Haines Site	George W. Haines Site	May 10, 1990 (#90000764)	Address restricted	Hainesville	
3	Howle Site	Howle Site	April 13, 1977 (#77001482)	Address restricted	Quitman	
4	Howard L. and Vivian W. Lott House	Howard L. and Vivian W. Lott House	October 9, 1998 (#98001185)	311 E. Kilpatrick St. 32°39′50″N 95°29′09″W	Mineola	Recorded Texas Historic Landmark
5	Mineola Downtown Historic District	Mineola Downtown Historic District	April 16, 2013 (#13000288)	Roughly: area around Line, Kilpatrick, Newsome, and Commerce Streets; 32°39′48″N 95°29′19″W	Mineola	Includes Recorded Texas Historic Landmarks
6	Joseph and Martha Moody Farmstead	Joseph and Martha Moody Farmstead	May 10, 1990 (#90000765)	Address restricted	Hainesville	
7	Ned Moody Site	Ned Moody Site	May 4, 1990 (#90000724)	Address restricted	Hainesville	
8	Osborn Site	Osborn Site	December 15, 1976 (#76002086)	Address restricted 32°48′34″N 95°33′01″W	Quitman	
9	Florence Robinson Cottage	Florence Robinson Cottage	May 5, 2000 (#00000453)	Washington Place at Emma B. Smith Blvd., Jarvis Christian College; 32°35′13″N 95°10′46″W	Hawkins	
10	Sadler Site	Sadler Site	April 13, 1977 (#77001481)	Address restricted	Alba	
