= Mimosa Hall =

Mimosa Hall may refer to:

- Mimosa Hall (Roswell, Georgia), a mansion in Roswell, Georgia, built in 1841
- Mimosa Hall (Leigh, Texas), listed on the National Register of Historic Places
