= National Register of Historic Places listings in Harrison County, Texas =

Location of Harrison County in Texas

This is a list of the National Register of Historic Places listings in Harrison County, Texas.

This is intended to be a complete list of properties and districts listed on the National Register of Historic Places in Harrison County, Texas. There are one district and 17 individual properties listed on the National Register in the county. Thirteen individually listed properties are Recorded Texas Historic Landmarks of which two are State Antiquities Landmarks including one that is also a State Historic Site. The district contains additional Recorded Texas Historic Landmarks.

This National Park Service list is complete through NPS recent listings posted July 31, 2026.

== Current listings ==
The publicly disclosed locations of National Register properties and districts may be seen in a mapping service provided.

	Name on the Register	Image	Date listed	Location	City or town	Description
1	Arnot House	Arnot House	July 27, 1979 (#79002970)	306 W. Houston St; 32°32′41″N 94°22′10″W	Marshall	Recorded Texas Historic Landmark
2	Dial-Williamson House	Dial-Williamson House	March 2, 1979 (#79002971)	3 mi (4.8 km) W of Marshall on Old Longview Rd. 32°33′04″N 94°25′19″W	Marshall	Recorded Texas Historic Landmark
3	Edgemont	Edgemont	September 22, 1977 (#77001449)	W of Marshall; 32°31′58″N 94°25′10″W	Marshall	Recorded Texas Historic Landmark
4	First Methodist Church	First Methodist Church	July 16, 1980 (#80004133)	300 E. Houston St. 32°32′42″N 94°21′55″W	Marshall	Recorded Texas Historic Landmark. Destroyed by fire December 9, 2024
5	Fry-Barry House	Fry-Barry House	November 21, 1978 (#78002950)	314 W. Austin; 32°32′44″N 94°22′11″W	Marshall	Recorded Texas Historic Landmark
6	Ginocchio Historic District	Ginocchio Historic District	December 31, 1974 (#74002076)	Bounded by Grand Ave., and N. Franklin, Willow, and Lake Sts. 32°33′05″N 94°21′57″W	Marshall	Includes Recorded Texas Historic Landmarks
7	Hagerty House	Hagerty House	September 13, 1978 (#78002951)	505 E. Rusk St. 32°32′49″N 94°21′43″W	Marshall	Recorded Texas Historic Landmark
8	Harrison County Courthouse	Harrison County Courthouse	August 16, 1977 (#77001450)	Public Square; 32°32′41″N 94°22′01″W	Marshall	State Antiquities Landmark, Recorded Texas Historic Landmark
9	Hochwald House	Hochwald House	July 14, 1983 (#83004487)	211 W. Grand Ave. 32°32′55″N 94°22′06″W	Marshall	Recorded Texas Historic Landmark
10	Locust Grove	Locust Grove	June 20, 1979 (#79002969)	Off TX 134; 32°32′26″N 94°40′57″W	Jonesville	
11	Marshall Arsenal, CSA	Marshall Arsenal, CSA	July 1, 1976 (#76002040)	Address restricted	Marshall	
12	Marshall US Post Office	Marshall US Post Office	April 25, 2001 (#01000435)	100 E. Houston St. 32°32′39″N 94°22′03″W	Marshall	
13	Mimosa Hall	Mimosa Hall	November 2, 1978 (#78002949)	S of Leigh off SR 134; 32°35′19″N 94°08′37″W	Leigh	
14	Old Pierce House	Old Pierce House	April 13, 1973 (#73001965)	303 N. Columbus St. 32°32′49″N 94°21′53″W	Marshall	Recorded Texas Historic Landmark
15	Starr House	Starr House	December 11, 1979 (#79002972)	407 W. Travis St. 32°32′31″N 94°22′13″W	Marshall	State Historic Site, State Antiquities Landmark, Recorded Texas Historic Landmark
16	John R. Stinson House	John R. Stinson House	November 7, 1979 (#79002973)	313 W. Austin St. 32°32′45″N 94°22′12″W	Marshall	Recorded Texas Historic Landmark
17	James Turner House	James Turner House	November 7, 1979 (#79002974)	406 S. Washington Ave. 32°32′31″N 94°22′01″W	Marshall	Recorded Texas Historic Landmark
18	Weisman-Hirsch House	Weisman-Hirsch House	July 7, 1983 (#83004488)	313 S. Washington St. 32°32′33″N 94°22′03″W	Marshall	Recorded Texas Historic Landmark

== See also ==
- National Register of Historic Places listings in Texas
- List of Texas State Historic Sites
- Recorded Texas Historic Landmarks in Harrison County
