= First Methodist Church (Marshall, Texas) =

Historic church in Texas, United States

- U.S. National Register of Historic Places
- Recorded Texas Historic Landmark
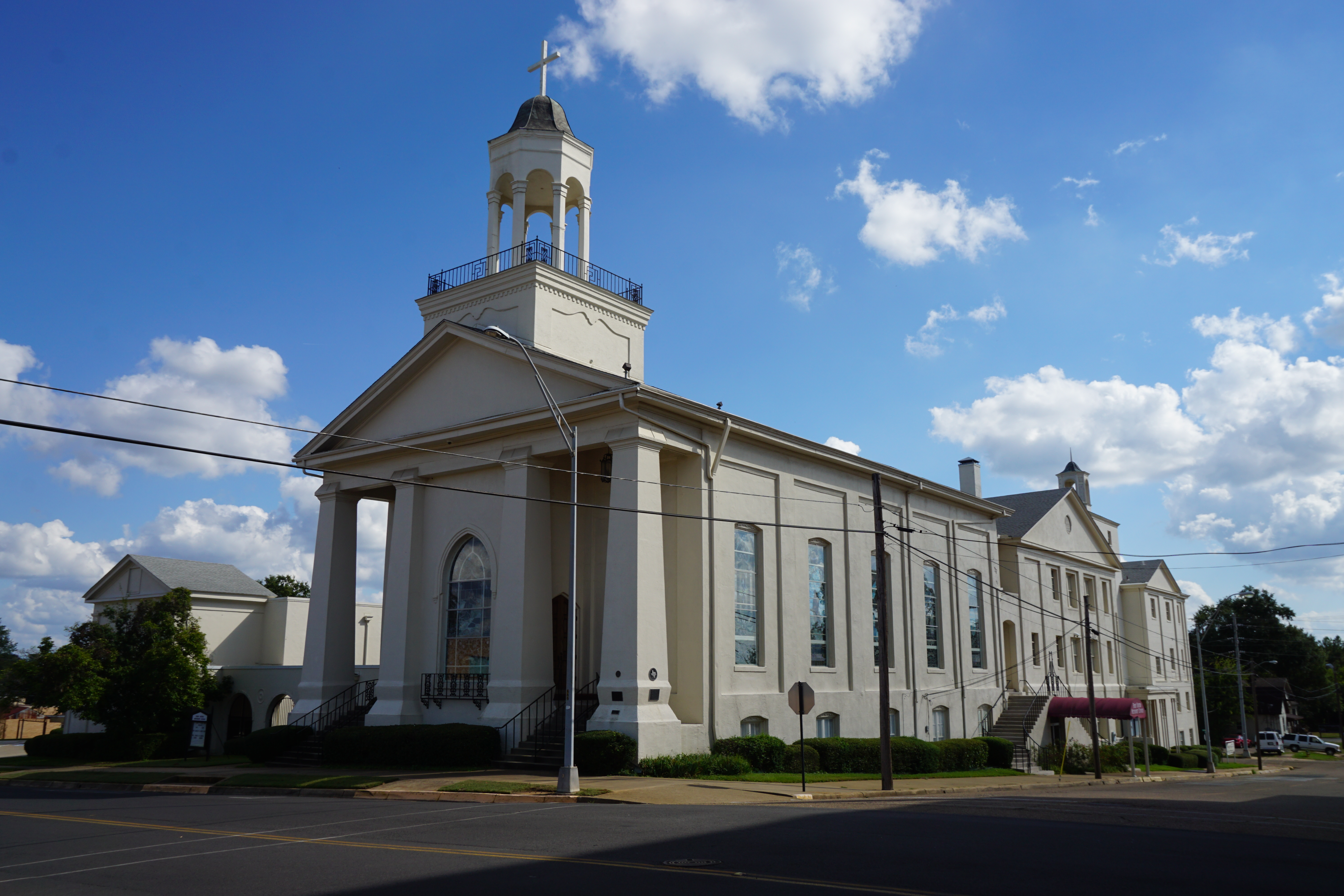
- First Methodist Church in 2016

- Location within Texas Location within the United States
- Location: 300 E. Houston St., Marshall, Texas
- Coordinates: 32°37′33″N 94°21′59″W
- Area: less than one acre
- Built: 1860
- Built by: Alexander Pope, Billington Smalley
- Architectural style: Greek Revival
- NRHP reference No.: 80004133
- RTHL No.: 10157

Significant dates
- Added to NRHP: July 16, 1980
- Designated RTHL: 1965

First Methodist Church of Marshall (Methodist Episcopal Church South of Marshall, First Methodist Episcopal Church South of Marshall, and First United Methodist Church of Marshall ., is historic Methodist congregation in Marshall, Texas. From 1861 to 2024, the congregation met at 300 E. Houston Street in Marshall, Texas. The building was a stuccoed brick Greek Revival-style church that had a portico with four monumental square columns; such architecture is rare in Texas. The building was added to the National Register in 1980. A fire on the morning of December 9, 2024 left the building in ruins and it was subsequently determined to be unsalvageable and demolished in 2025.

== History ==
The church began as part of the circuit riding of Littleton Fowler in 1839 and was reorganized as a permanent congregation under Job M. Baker as in 1845. The church held its meetings in a schoolhouse until 1853, when it moved to a converted building. The church acquired lots 1 and 6 of block 9 in the Original Town Site on April 6, 1860 from Thomas and Mary Bennett for $500 and swapped land with William and Mary Johnson to gain an 85‐foot frontage on East Houston Street.The congregation decided on March 10, 1860 to build the new sanctuary and on July 6, 1860 contracts were awarded to Billington Smalley for the woodwork and Alexander Pope for the foundation and walls.

It was documented in 1936 by the Historic American Buildings Survey. The portico was originally topped by a belfry but that was replaced in 1949 by a large octagonal cupola. It was built during 1860 to 1861 by slave labor. Its builders included mason Alexander Pope and carpenter Billingon Smalley. It was expanded in 1949 and in 1958.

Enoch Mather Marvin served at First Methodist and was elevated to Bishop of Trans-Mississippi Conference of the Methodist Episcopal Church, South during his tenure in Marshall. Marvin Methodist Episcopal Church, South in Tyler is named after him.

During the American Civil War, Confederate supplies were stored in the basement and it was the site of organization for the war effort. It was the site of the first conference, in 1862, of the Trans-Mississippi states convened by Confederate President Jefferson Davis. Texas Governor Lubbock, Missouri Governor Jackson, and representatives of Arkansas and Louisiana participated.

In December of 2024, the church that had been standing for centuries caught fire, and most of the building had to be leveled. As of October of 2025, the church is still in the process of being rebuilt in a way that honors the old building, and adjusts to the current church life of Marshall.

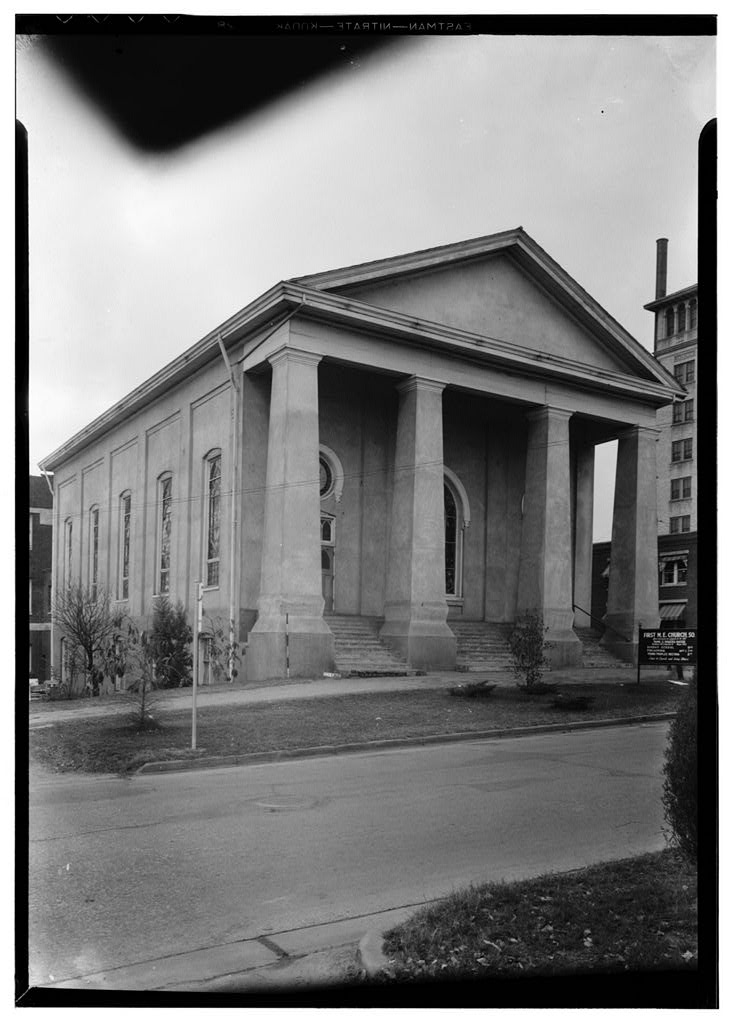
HABS photo of the North face of First Methodist in 1936.

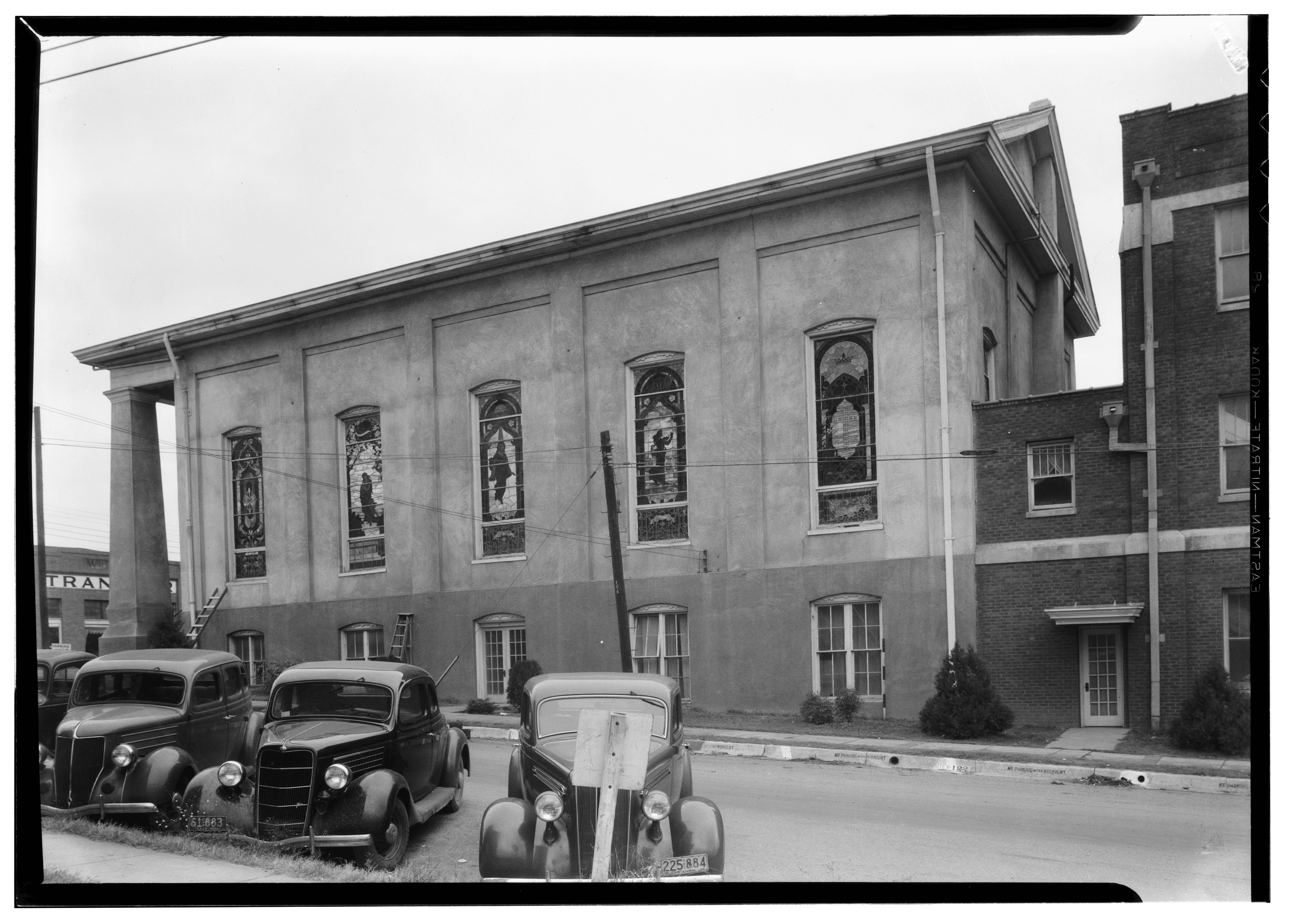
HABS photo of the West face of First Methodist in 1936.

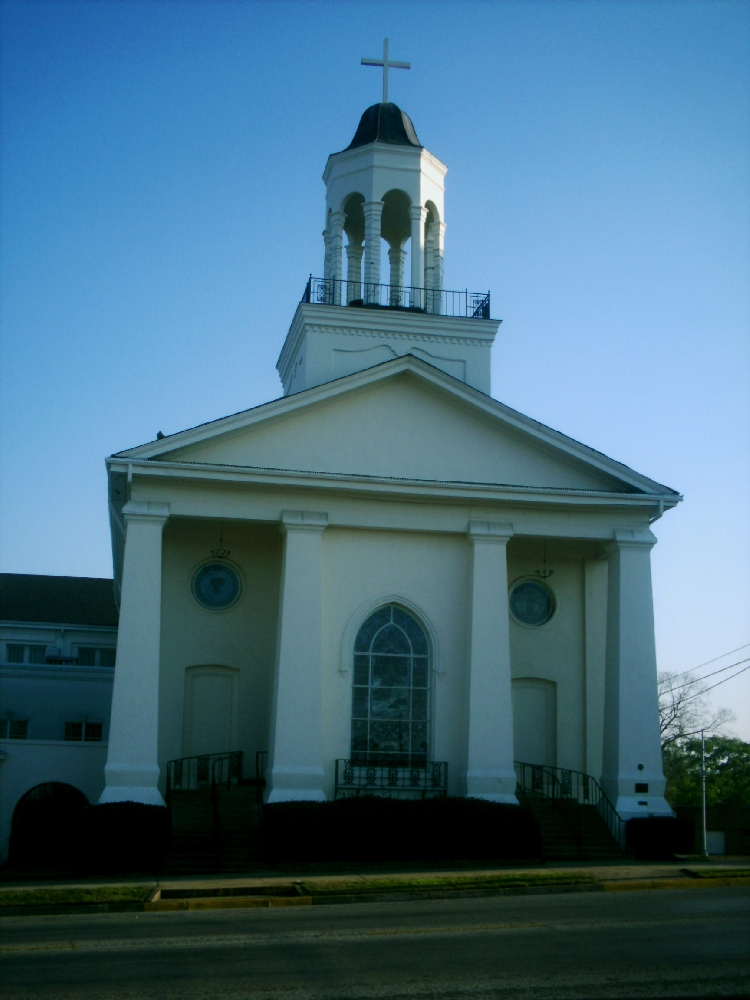
North face of First Methodist Church in 2005.

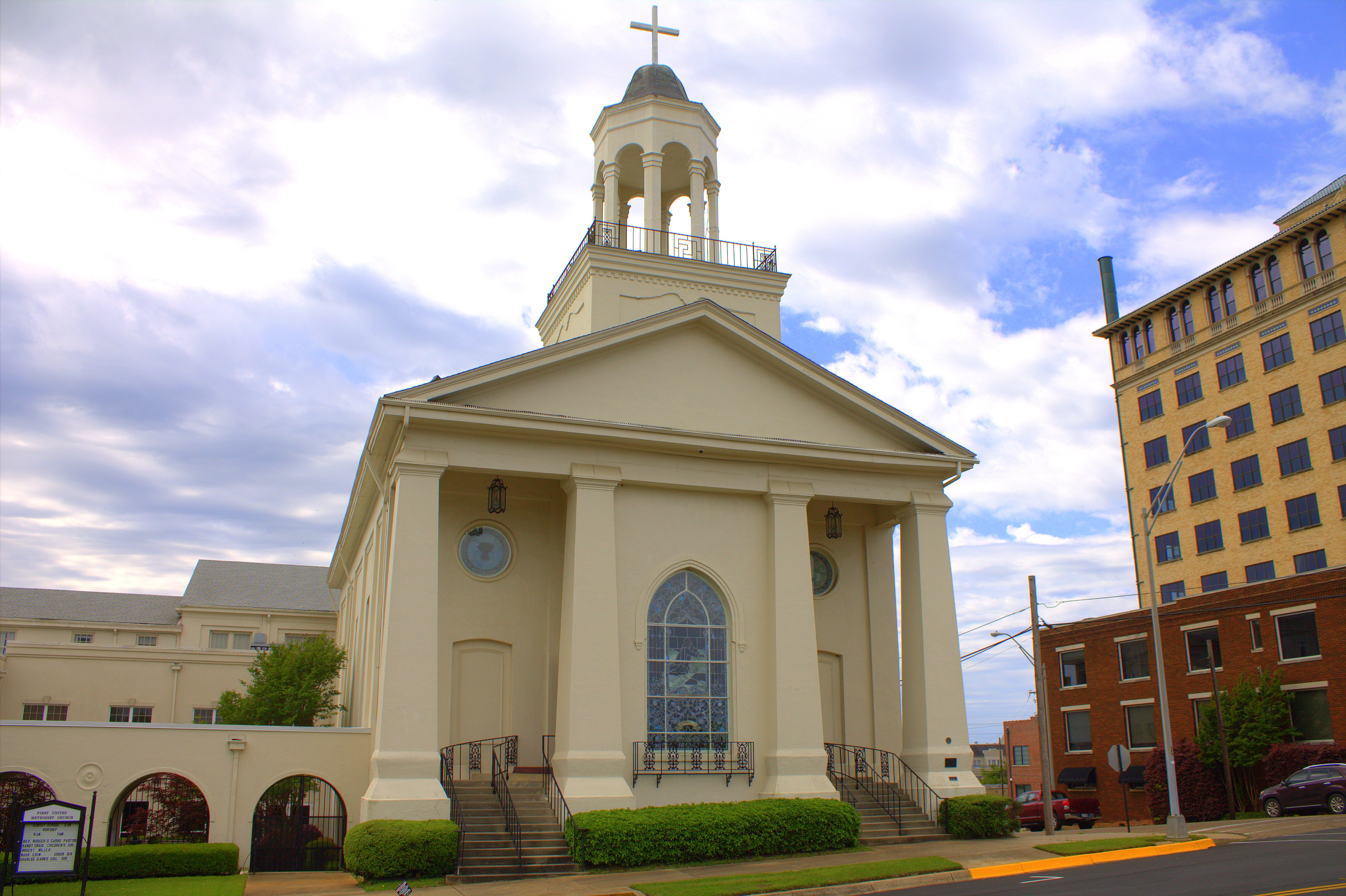
North and west faces of First Methodist Church in 2015.

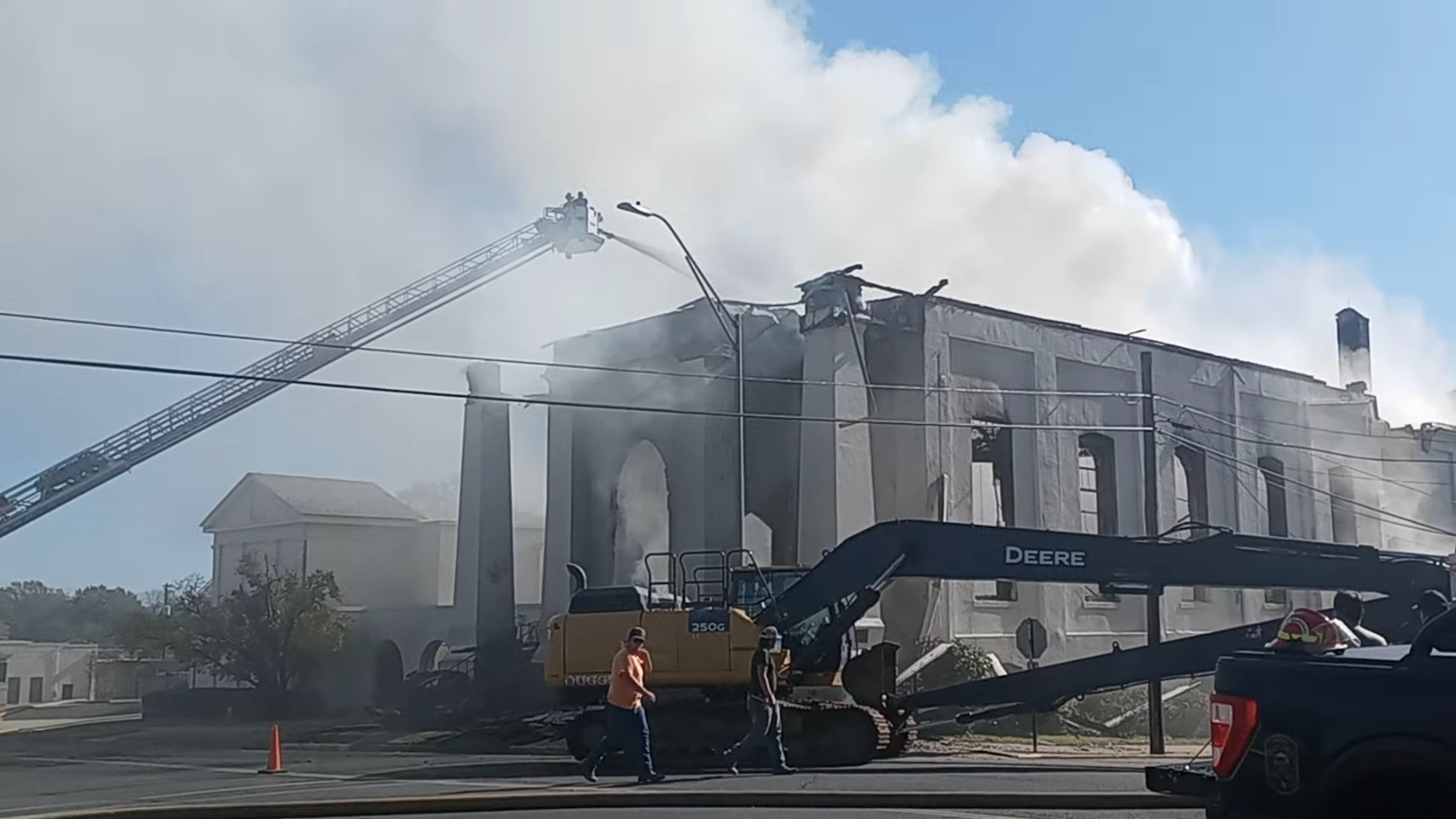
First Methodist burns for the eleventh hour as fire crews from Marshall and Longview fight it as an excavator is brought in to demolish the western wall.

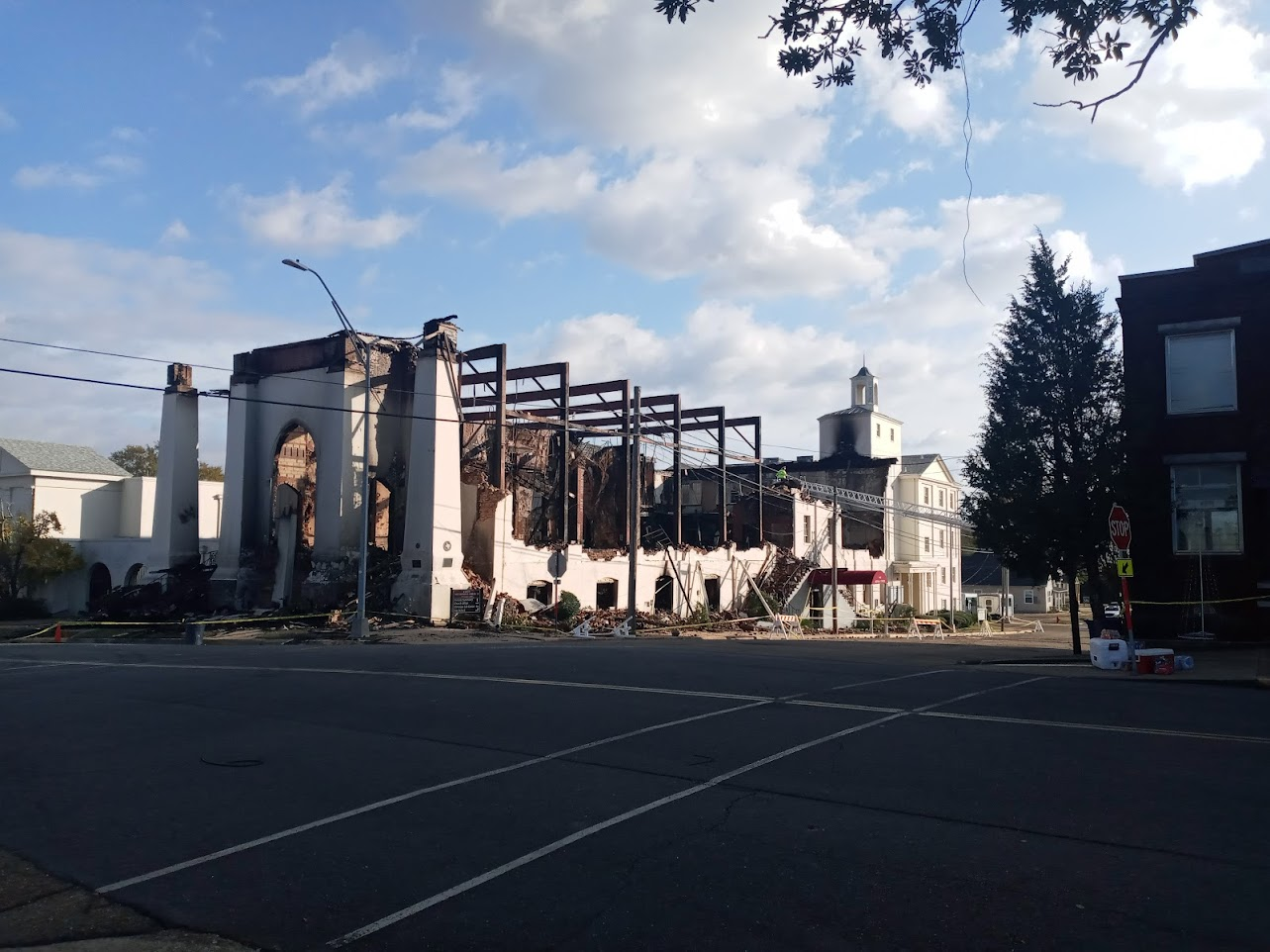
First Methodist stands in ruins on the afternoon of December 10, 2024 after the fire.

== See also ==
- National Register of Historic Places listings in Harrison County, Texas
- Recorded Texas Historic Landmarks in Harrison County
