= James Harper Starr =

American public official (1809–1890)

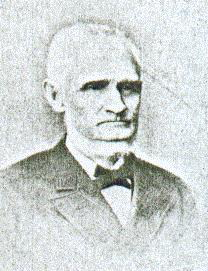

Commissioner of the Texas General Land Office

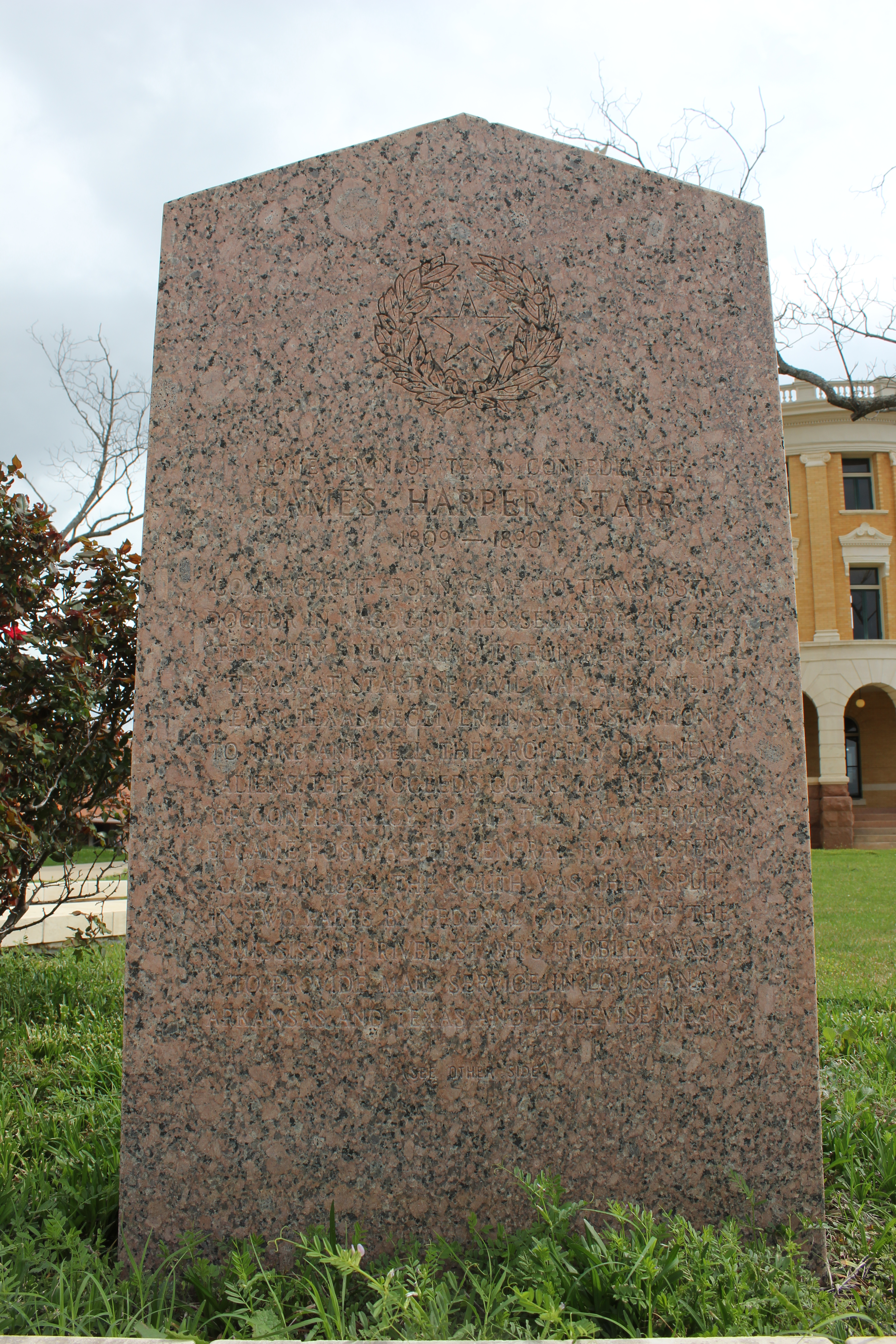
Connecticut-born. Came to Texas 1837. A doctor in Nacogdoches. Secretary of the Treasury and army surgeon, Republic of Texas. At start of Civil War appointed to take and sell the property of enemy aliens, the proceeds going to Treasury of Confederacy to aid the war effort. Became Postmaster General for western C.S.A. in 1864. The South was then split in two parts by federal control of the Mississippi River. Starr's problem was to provide mail service in Louisiana, Arkansas and Texas and to devise means to get mail through the enemy military lines and naval blockade to and from westerners fighting east of the river and the confederate capital. This was essential to soldier and home front morale and to maintain necessary military and governmental communications. The mail was carried by pony express, wagons, blockade running vessels, stage coach lines, couriers, spies and army details. Starr competed with the army to get drivers, wagons and horses. Draft by military of postal employees was fought by writs of habeas corpus. "Men" under 16 were hired. Printing facilities were limited and forms, supplies, stamps had to be smuggled. The children of a cabinet officer once came through enemy lines with $3,000,000 worth of stamps for him. After the war, Starr in 1865 looked into East Texas oil showings. He founded Marshall's first bank. Starr county was named in his honor. Erected by the State of Texas 1963

James Harper Starr (December 18, 1809 – July 25, 1890) served as a commissioner of the Texas General Land Office and later Secretary of the Treasury of the Republic of Texas and also as director of the postal service of the Trans-Mississippi Department of the Confederate States of America during the American Civil War as well as the namesake of Starr County in Texas.

After the defeat of the Confederacy, Starr was barred from serving in public office, as were most Confederate officials. His eldest son's home in Marshall, Texas, "Maplecroft", was designated a state historic site in the 1970s and is open to the public.
