= National Register of Historic Places listings in Red River County, Texas =

Location of Red River County in Texas

This is a list of the National Register of Historic Places listings in Red River County, Texas.

This is intended to be a complete list of properties and districts listed on the National Register of Historic Places in Red River County, Texas. There are two districts and five individual properties listed on the National Register in the county. Two individually listed properties are Recorded Texas Historic Landmarks including one that is also a State Antiquities Landmark.

This National Park Service list is complete through NPS recent listings posted March 21, 2025.

== Current listings ==
The publicly disclosed locations of National Register properties and districts may be seen in a mapping service provided.

	Name on the Register	Image	Date listed	Location	City or town	Description
1	Bogata Historic District	Bogata Historic District	September 24, 2020 (#100005602)	Main St., roughly between Mount Pleasant Rd. and 2nd St. 33°28′16″N 95°12′50″W	Bogata	
2	Sam Kaufman Site	Sam Kaufman Site	August 14, 1973 (#73001973)	Address restricted	Blakeney	Also known as the "Kaufman-Williams Site"; one of few prehistoric sites with evidence of osteochondritis dissecans
3	Kiomatia Mounds Archeological District	Kiomatia Mounds Archeological District	January 11, 1974 (#74002089)	Address restricted	Kiomatia	
4	McCarty Site	McCarty Site	December 1, 1978 (#78003377)	Address restricted	Pin Hook	
5	Neely Site 41 RR 48	Neely Site 41 RR 48	August 20, 1982 (#82004520)	Address restricted	Manchester	
6	Red River County Courthouse	Red River County Courthouse	August 31, 1978 (#78002977)	Public Sq. 33°36′47″N 95°03′04″W	Clarksville	State Antiquities Landmark, Recorded Texas Historic Landmark
7	Smathers-Demorse House	Smathers-Demorse House	May 17, 1976 (#76002060)	E. Comanche St. 33°36′46″N 95°02′58″W	Clarksville	Recorded Texas Historic Landmark

== See also ==
- National Register of Historic Places listings in Texas
- Recorded Texas Historic Landmarks in Red River County
