= Harrison County Historical Museum =

Coordinates: 32.5450°N 94.3673°W

Harrison County Historical Museum is a historical museum in Marshall, Texas, dedicated to the history of Harrison County, Texas. The museum features several rooms of exhibits ranging in topic from the Native American Caddo culture to the history of the HBCU Wiley College.

The museum started in the Old Courthouse on Peter Whetstone Square in 1964. Extensive remodeling to the building took place in the late 1990s and the museum's main exhibits are still on display in the 1901 Courthouse. An additional military exhibit, Service & Sacrifice, is on display across the street inside Memorial City Hall. Their archived items and research center are now housed in the Inez Hatley Hughes Historical Research Center at 104 East Crockett, just a few blocks south of the courthouse.

The museum houses thousands of artifacts and also has an extensive photographic and text archive partially maintained by a genealogical society. Notable pieces housed in the museum include an Inaugural ball gown worn by Lady Bird Johnson and an accompanying suit worn by Lyndon Johnson, the Emmy that journalist Bill Moyers won for his documentary Marshall, Texas: Marshall, Texas, and George Foreman's world championship belt.
