= James Turner House =

- U.S. National Register of Historic Places
- Recorded Texas Historic Landmark
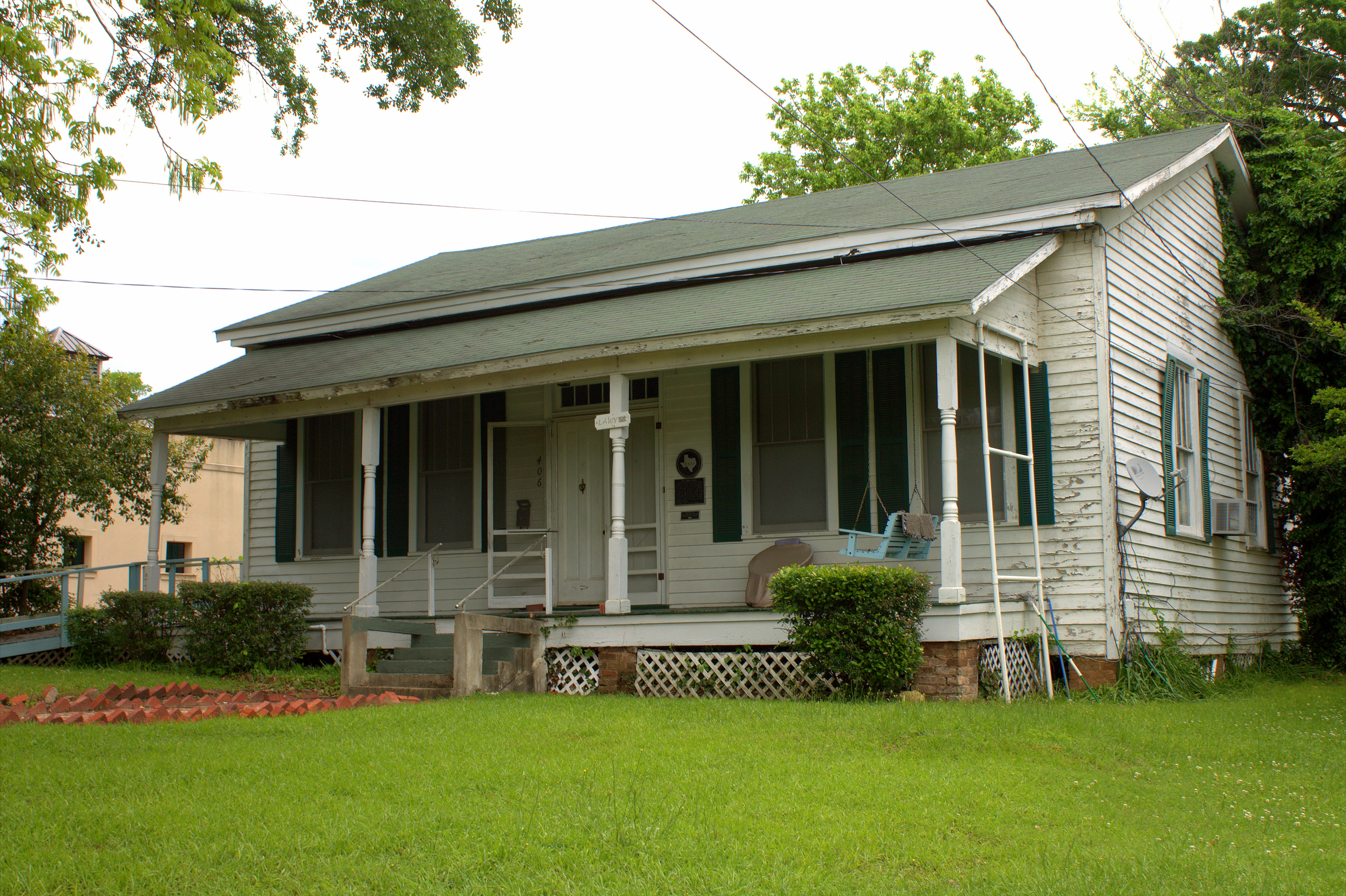
- James Turner House in 2015

- Location within Texas Location within the United States
- Location: 406 S. Washington Ave., Marshall, Texas
- Coordinates: 32°32′31″N 94°22′1″W
- Area: less than one acre
- Built: 1850
- Built by: G.G. Gregg
- Architectural style: Greek Revival, Victorian
- NRHP reference No.: 79002974
- RTHL No.: 10222

Significant dates
- Added to NRHP: November 7, 1979
- Designated RTHL: 1979

The James Turner House, a one-story Greek Revival style building located on 406 South Washington Avenue in Marshall, Texas, was built by a merchant, George Gammon Gregg to be the home for him and his bride, Mary Ann Wilson, who were married in 1851. It was first located at the southeast corner of Crockett Street and Washington Avenue.

James Turner, an attorney and former Confederate soldier, acquired the house in 1866. He had moved to Marshall from Sumner County, Tennessee in 1858. Turner and his wife had nine children and he built a separate structure as a "dormitory" for the expanding family. Turner became mayor of Marshall. In 1890, his son Robert added the Victorian columns and front porch, after he moved into the house with his new wife. Robert owned the house after the death of his father in 1913.

It was moved in the 20th century from Lot 1, facing Crockett Street, to Lot 2, now facing South Washington Avenue. At that time, the "dormitory" was razed and the salvaged wood was used for an addition of a new kitchen, a bathroom, and another room. The house had been unoccupied and fallen into disrepair several years after being used as an office building by the Harrison County Charities. The house was restored in 1977 by Robert's daughter and last surviving child, Eleanor Turner Gillespie, to essentially its original design; She removed the addition and replaced the roof and damaged plaster.

The house was made a Recorded Texas Historic Landmark and a historic marker was installed in 1979. It was also listed as a National Register of Historic Places that year.

== See also ==
- National Register of Historic Places listings in Harrison County, Texas
- Recorded Texas Historic Landmarks in Harrison County
