= Starr Family Home State Historic Site =

- Starr House
- U.S. National Register of Historic Places
- Texas State Historic Site
- Texas State Antiquities Landmark
- Recorded Texas Historic Landmark
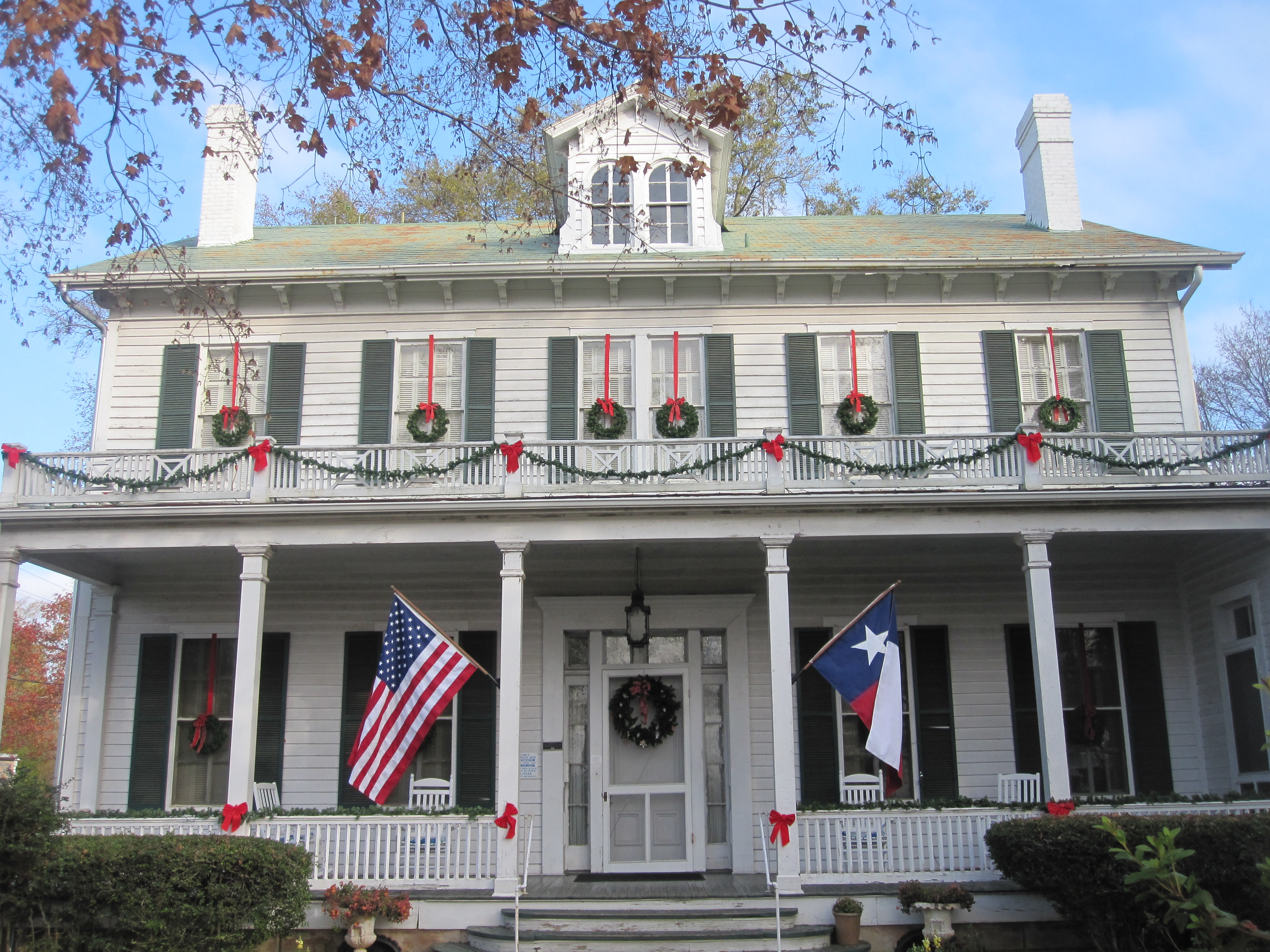
- Starr Home at Christmas in 2009

- Location within Texas Location within the United States
- Location: 407 W. Travis St., Marshall, Texas
- Coordinates: 32°32′31″N 94°22′13″W
- Area: less than one acre
- Built: 1870
- Architectural style: Greek Revival
- Website: Starr Family Home State Historic Site
- NRHP reference No.: 79002972
- TSAL No.: 8200000341
- RTHL No.: 10187

Significant dates
- Added to NRHP: December 11, 1979
- Designated TSHS: 1986
- Designated TSAL: January 1, 1983
- Designated RTHL: 1964

Starr Family Home State Historic Site is a 3.1-acre (1.3 ha) historical site operated by the Texas Historical Commission in downtown Marshall, Texas. It was listed on the National Register of Historic Places in 1979. The museum was made a Recorded Texas Historic Landmark in 1986. On January 1, 2008, the site was transferred from the Texas Parks and Wildlife Department to the Texas Historical Commission.

== Description ==
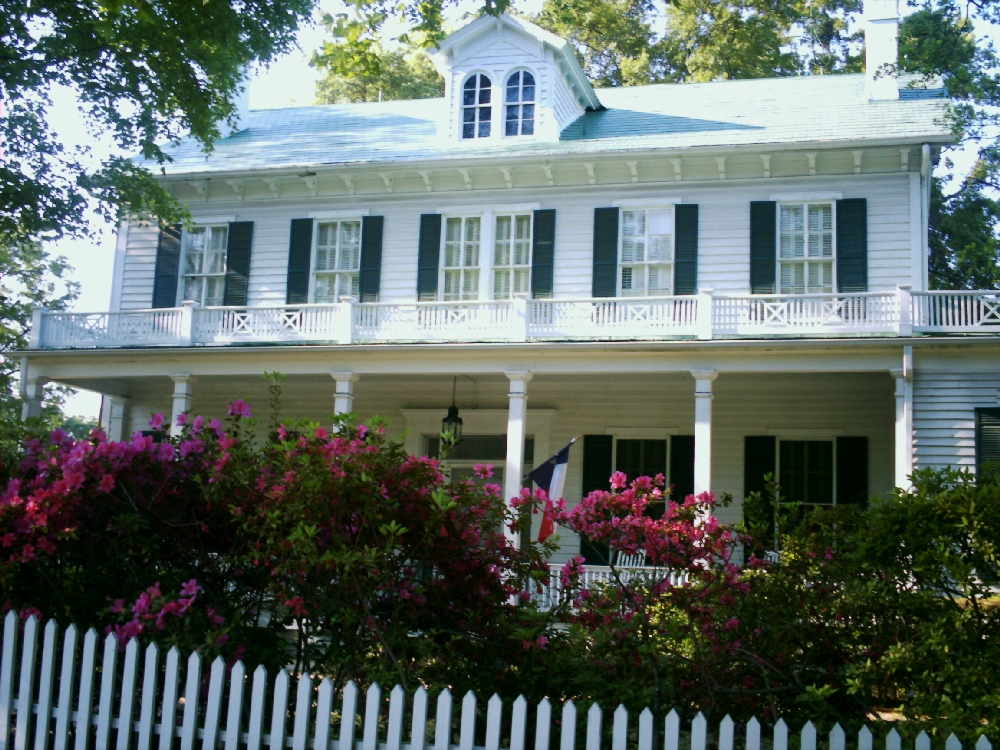
Maplecroft is located at the corner of Travis and Grove streets in Marshall, Texas.

The site encompasses several structures used by the Starr Family, most notably the main house or Starr Home, Maplecroft, and Rosemont Cottage. Rosemont Cottage is the only remaining portion of Rosemont, the antebellum plantation home that used to stand behind Maplecroft.

The site portrays 150 years and four generations of one of the most influential political families in the periods of the Republic of Texas and early statehood. The family donated the site to the State of Texas in 1976 and in 1982 the site was enlarged to include all of the Starr family residences. The Starrs continued to live at the site until 1985; the site was opened to the public in 1986 as a Texas state park.

James Frank Starr commissioned the construction of the main attraction of the park, Maplecroft. The 1871 Starr home is a two-story, frame, modified late Greek Revival structure with some Victorian styling. Craftsmen, such as shipwrights, and building materials were shipped from New Orleans to Marshall.

In 1985, the house and three acres encompassing seven historic buildings was left to the State of Texas upon the death of the last owner, Mrs. Clara Pope Willoughby.

== See also ==
- Dr. James Harper Starr
- National Register of Historic Places listings in Harrison County, Texas
- List of Texas state historic sites
- Recorded Texas Historic Landmarks in Harrison County
