= Hagerty House =

Historic house in Texas, United States

- U.S. National Register of Historic Places
- Recorded Texas Historic Landmark
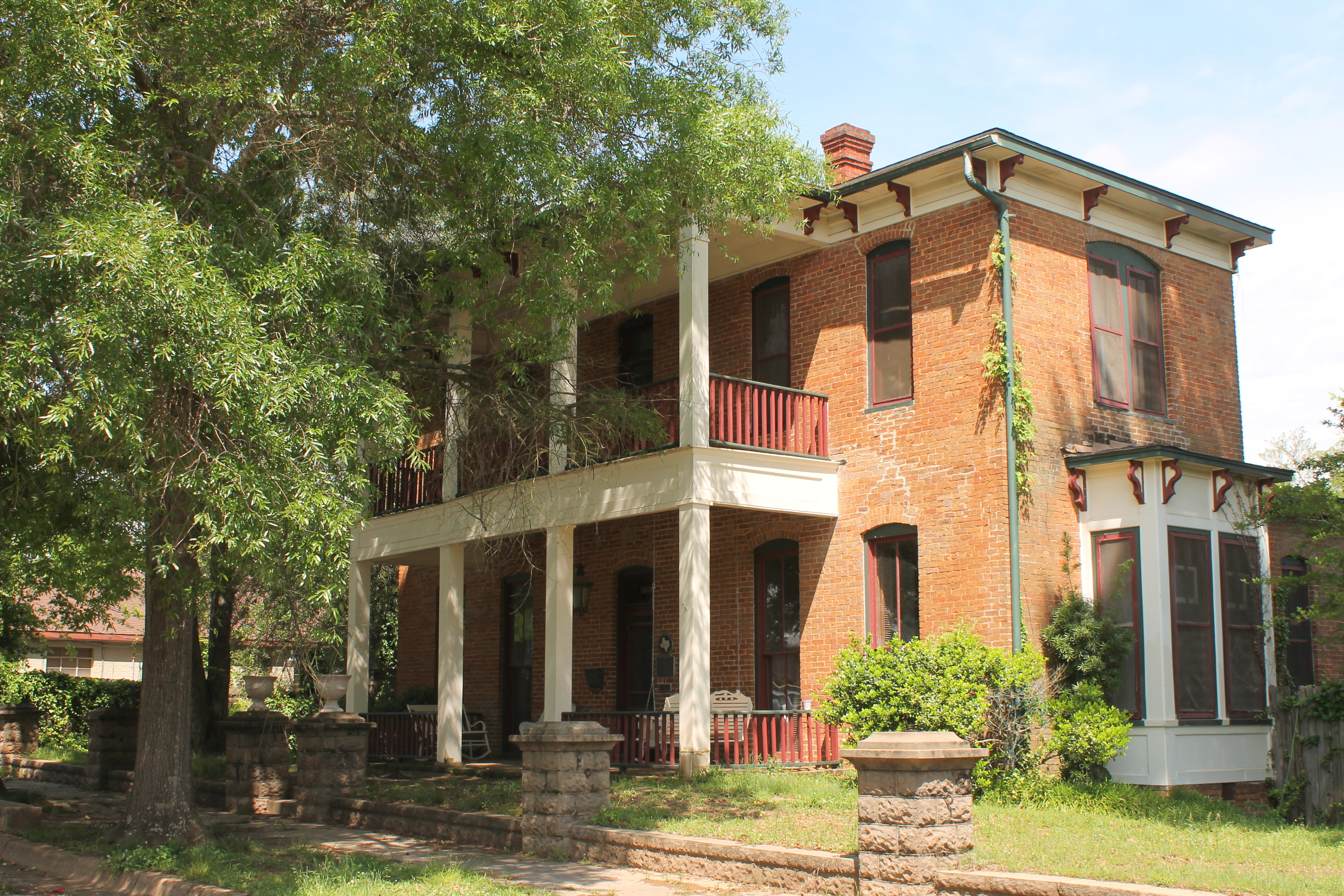
- Hagerty House in 2015

- Location within Texas Location within the United States
- Location: 505 E. Rusk St., Marshall, Texas
- Coordinates: 32°32′49″N 94°21′43″W
- Area: less than one acre
- Built: 1889
- Built by: Thomas Higgins
- Architectural style: Victorian Italianate
- NRHP reference No.: 78002951
- RTHL No.: 10169

Significant dates
- Added to NRHP: September 13, 1978
- Designated RTHL: 1977

The Hagerty House, also called the Hagerty-Harris House, is a two-story house located on 505 East Rusk Street in Marshall, Texas, United States. Built in 1889 by Thomas Higgins, it was the first solid brick residence in Marshall. It was built for William Phillip Hagerty, personal engineer of Texas and Pacific Railroad president George J. Gould by railway craftsmen. Born in 1848 in Ireland during the Great Famine, Hagerty was likely to be arrested by the British government due to his nationalist activities when he emigrated in 1866 to the United States.

Members of the Hagerty family owned the house until 1967. Five years later, it was sold to the Harris family. Dr. James H. Harris and his son Dr. Rush C. Harris restored the house.

The house was made a Recorded Texas Historic Landmark and a historic marker was installed in 1977. It was also listed as a National Register of Historic Places the following year.

== See also ==
- National Register of Historic Places listings in Harrison County, Texas
- Recorded Texas Historic Landmarks in Harrison County
