= Old Harrison County Courthouse (Texas) =

- Harrison County Courthouse
- U.S. National Register of Historic Places
- Texas State Antiquities Landmark
- Recorded Texas Historic Landmark
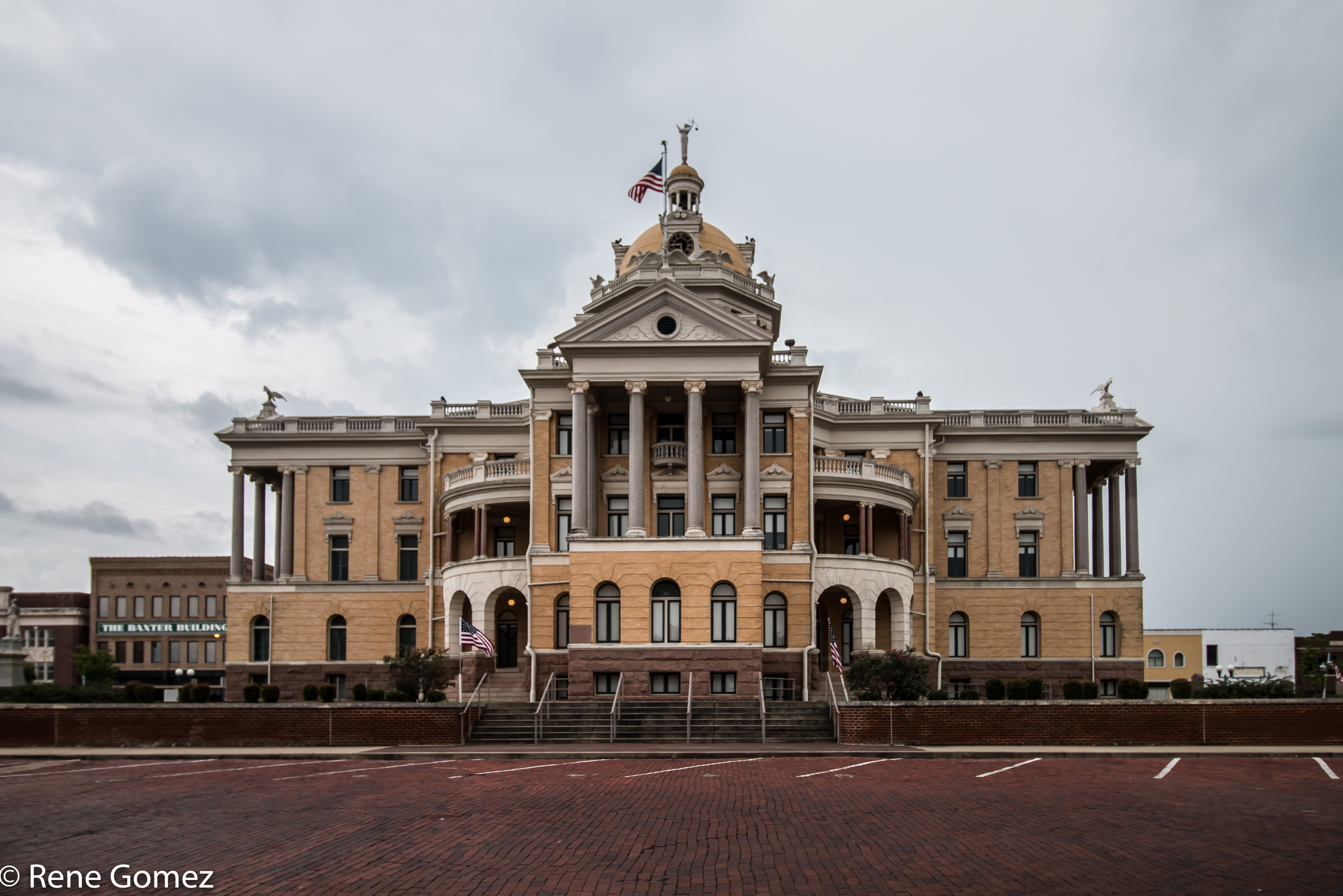
- Old Harrison County Courthouse in 2017

- Location within Texas Location within the United States
- Interactive map showing the location of Old Harrison County Courthouse
- Location: Public Square, Marshall, Texas
- Coordinates: 32°32′41″N 94°22′1″W
- Area: less than one acre
- Built: 1900
- Built by: Sonnefield and Emmins
- Architect: James Riely Gordon, C.G. Lancaster
- Architectural style: Neo-Italian Renaissance
- NRHP reference No.: 77001450
- TSAL No.: 8200000339
- RTHL No.: 10177

Significant dates
- Added to NRHP: August 16, 1977
- Designated TSAL: January 1, 1981
- Designated RTHL: 1965

The Old Harrison County Courthouse is located in the center of Whetstone Square in Marshall, Texas and is one of the most famous and admired buildings in Texas. It is the signature landmark of Marshall and is frequently used to represent East Texas in travel literature.

The Old Courthouse is listed on the National Register of Historic Places. From 1964 until 2000 the building housed the Harrison County Historical Museum. The building is noted as being the location of the first sit-ins in Texas.

== Design ==
The structure was designed by James Riely Gordon and supervised by a local architect C. G. Lancaster.

=== The Dome ===
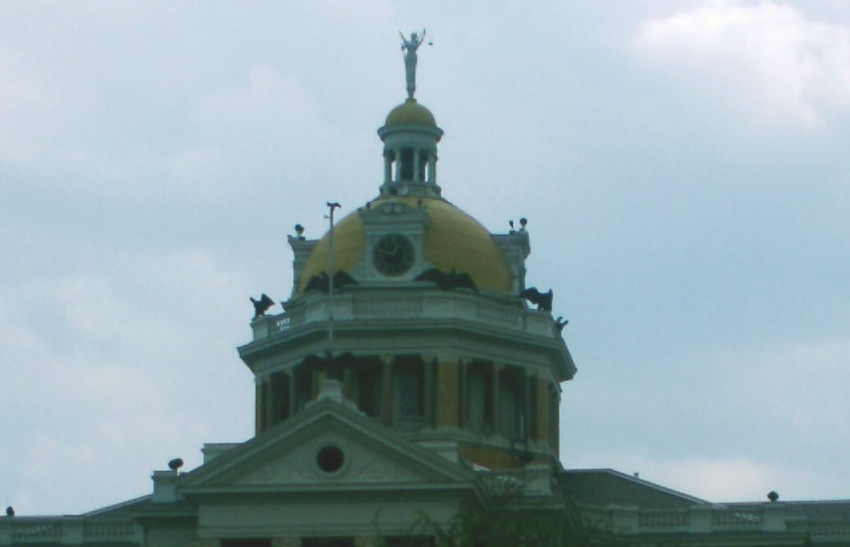
A detail of the northern face of the Old Courthouse's dome.

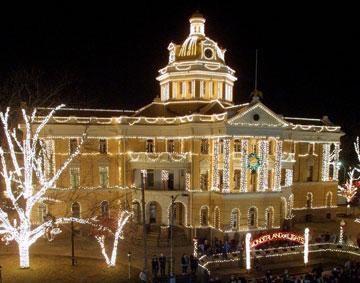
The former Harrison County Courthouse in Marshall lit at Christmas

The building's dome is its most distinctive feature and stands above a four-level rotunda. The rotunda is crowned by a coffered or false dome. Between the coffered dome and the outer dome are the workings of four-faced clock, that has been recently restored. Surrounding the coffered dome are six walls, which would resemble a hexagon if view from above, all of which support the outer dome. On the outside is a false portico aligned with each wall. Where the side of the hexagonal floor plan meet, a V-shaped brick pillar where two sides of the hexagon meet; thus each side of the V-shaped brick pillars span two porticos. In between the V-shaped brick pillars are three marble columns; one on each side of every window set into the walls supporting the outer dome. The windows are aligned to feed light through stained glass insets in the coffered dome hanging over the rotunda.

A cornice extends out over the false porticos and their pillar from the bottom of the outer dome. A balustrade, runs along the top of the cornice which like the porticos below it would appear as a hexagon if viewed from above. Eagle statues are perched wherever two sides of six-sided balustrade meet. The outer dome rise in from the cornice, which if viewed from above would appear as a circle inside a hexagon. The north, south, east, and west side of the outer dome are interrupted by clock faces, which maintain a vertical position even as the outer dome curves backwards. A false belfry, reminiscent of the lantern on top of the United States Capitol building, is located on top of the outer dome. On the top of the belfry is a 6-foot-tall (1.8 m) statue of Lady Justitia, which has the typical features of any Lady Justice: a blindfold, scales, and raised sword; as well as the rather atypical feature of a set of wings.

== See also ==
- National Register of Historic Places listings in Harrison County, Texas
- Recorded Texas Historic Landmarks in Harrison County
