= Hochwald House =

- U.S. National Register of Historic Places
- Recorded Texas Historic Landmark
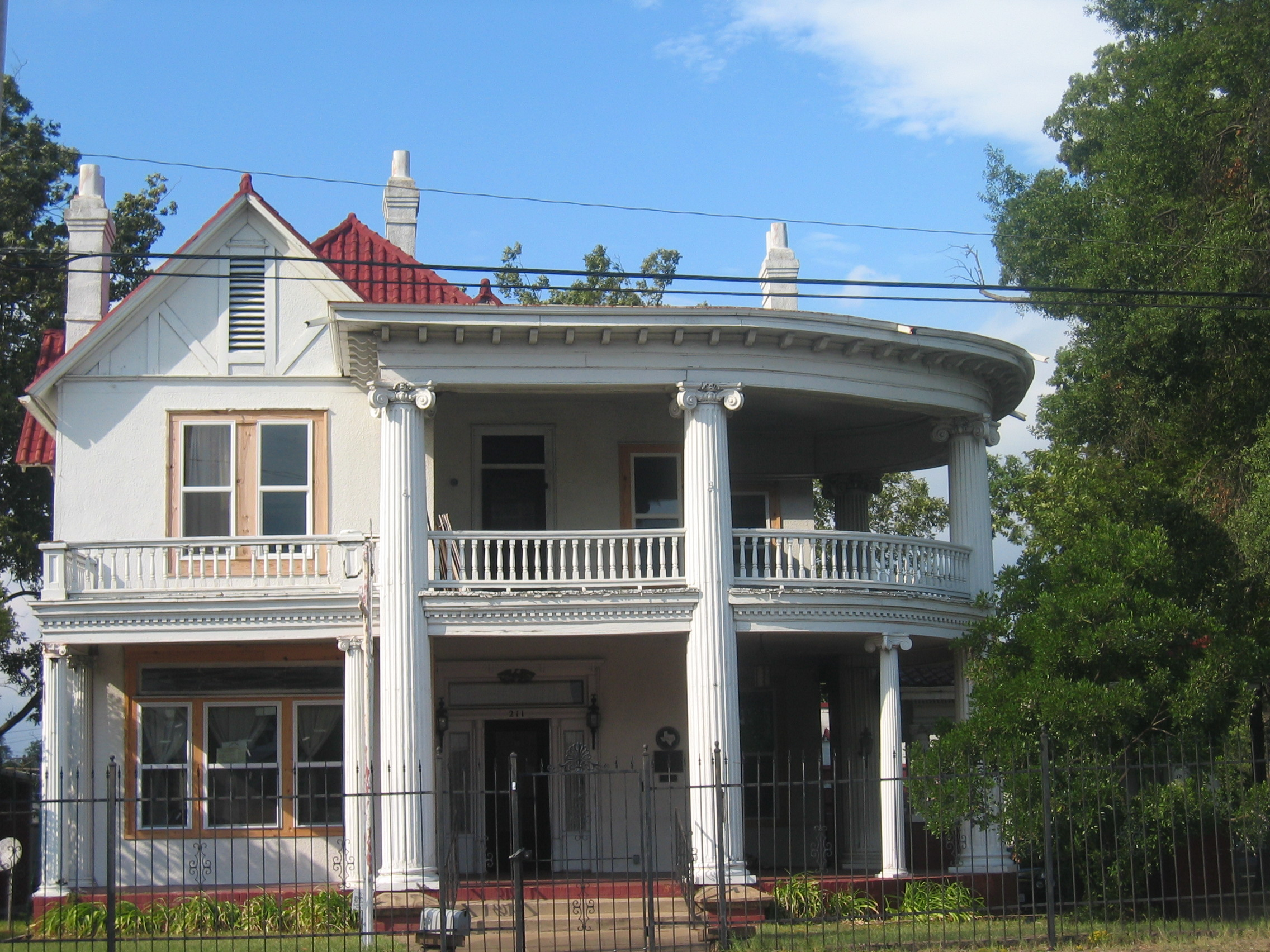
- Hochwald House in 2006

- Location within Texas Location within the United States
- Location: 211 W. Grand Ave., Marshall, Texas
- Coordinates: 32°32′55″N 94°22′6″W
- Area: less than one acre
- Built: 1894
- Architectural style: Colonial Revival, Queen Anne
- NRHP reference No.: 83004487
- RTHL No.: 10180

Significant dates
- Added to NRHP: July 14, 1983
- Designated RTHL: 1978

The Hochwald House is a Victorian 2 1/2-story house on 211 West Grand Avenue in Marshall, Texas. Built 1894 to 1895, the house was named after Isaac Hochwald (1865-1956), a prominent Jewish merchant. In 1912, the house was renovated to include classical revival features. Hochwald, who built the house with his wife Amelia Raphel Hochwald, lived in the house until 1956.

The house was made a Recorded Texas Historic Landmark in 1978 and a historic marker was installed the following year.

== See also ==
- National Register of Historic Places listings in Harrison County, Texas
- Recorded Texas Historic Landmarks in Harrison County
