= Arnot House =

- U.S. National Register of Historic Places
- Recorded Texas Historic Landmark
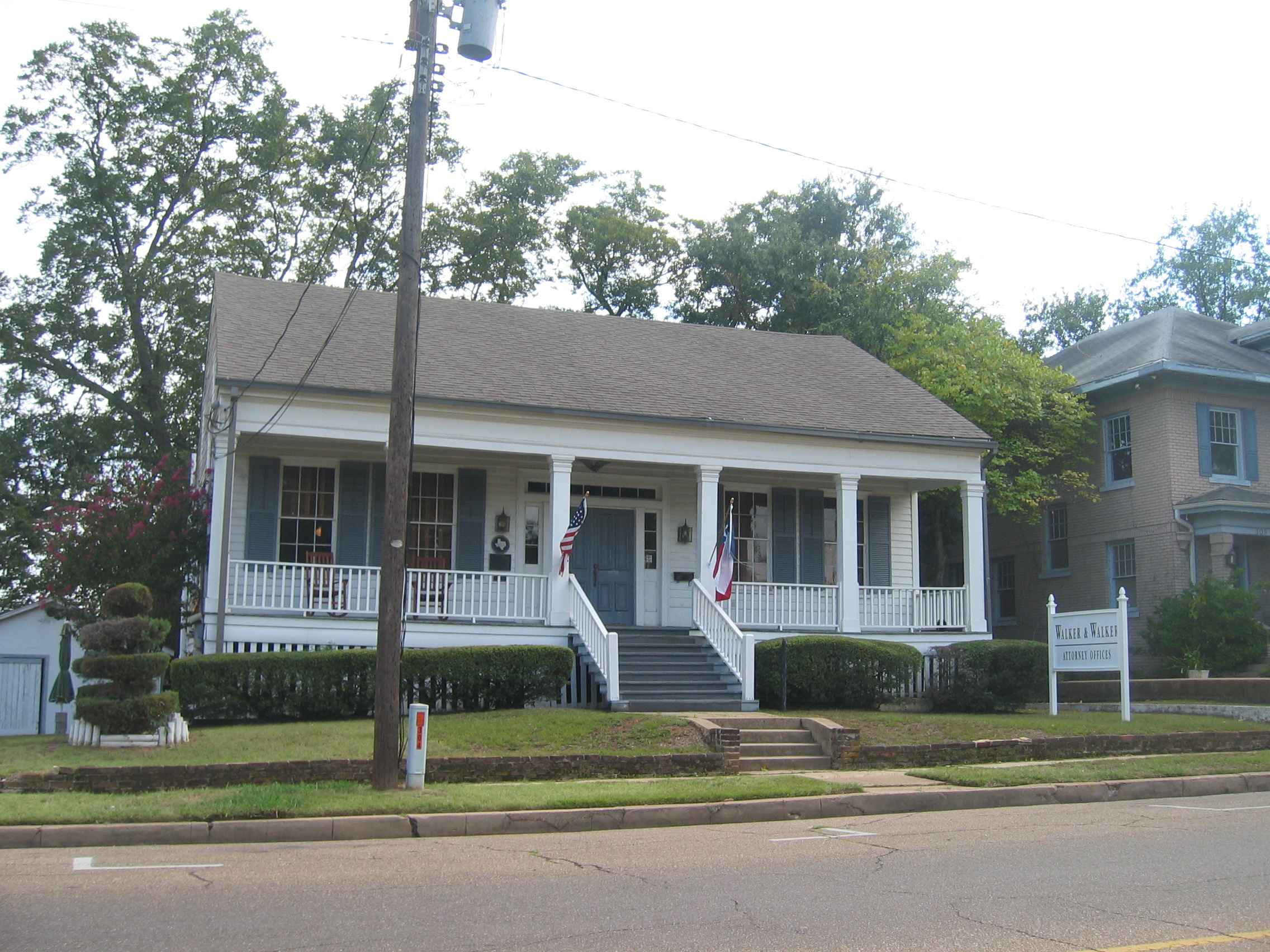
- Arnot House in 2006

- Location within Texas Location within the United States
- Location: 306 W. Houston St., Marshall, Texas
- Coordinates: 32°32′41″N 94°22′10″W
- Area: less than one acre
- Built: 1848
- Built by: Albert M. Arnot
- Architectural style: Greek Revival
- NRHP reference No.: 79002970
- RTHL No.: 10138

Significant dates
- Added to NRHP: July 27, 1979
- Designated RTHL: 1962

The Arnot House is a raised one-story house located at 306 W. Houston Street in Marshall, Texas. Built in 1848, it is one of the oldest houses in Marshall. An early Greek Revival style building, it is also described as a "classic Creole, or Louisiana raised-cottage, rendered in the Greek Revival style." It is made of wood frame on load-bearing brick basement/ground floor walls, with "Marshall Brown" brick laid in common bond. The front porch, which is covered by the house's gable roof, "is articulated with stout square columns, placing the house in the early phase of Greek Revival."

It was named after settlers Lucinda and Albert M. Arnot. Throughout its history the house has had several owners.

The house was made a Recorded Texas Historic Landmark and a historic marker was installed in 1962. The house was added to the National Register of Historic Places on July 27, 1979.

== See also ==
- National Register of Historic Places listings in Harrison County, Texas
- Recorded Texas Historic Landmarks in Harrison County
