= Fry-Barry House =

- U.S. National Register of Historic Places
- Recorded Texas Historic Landmark
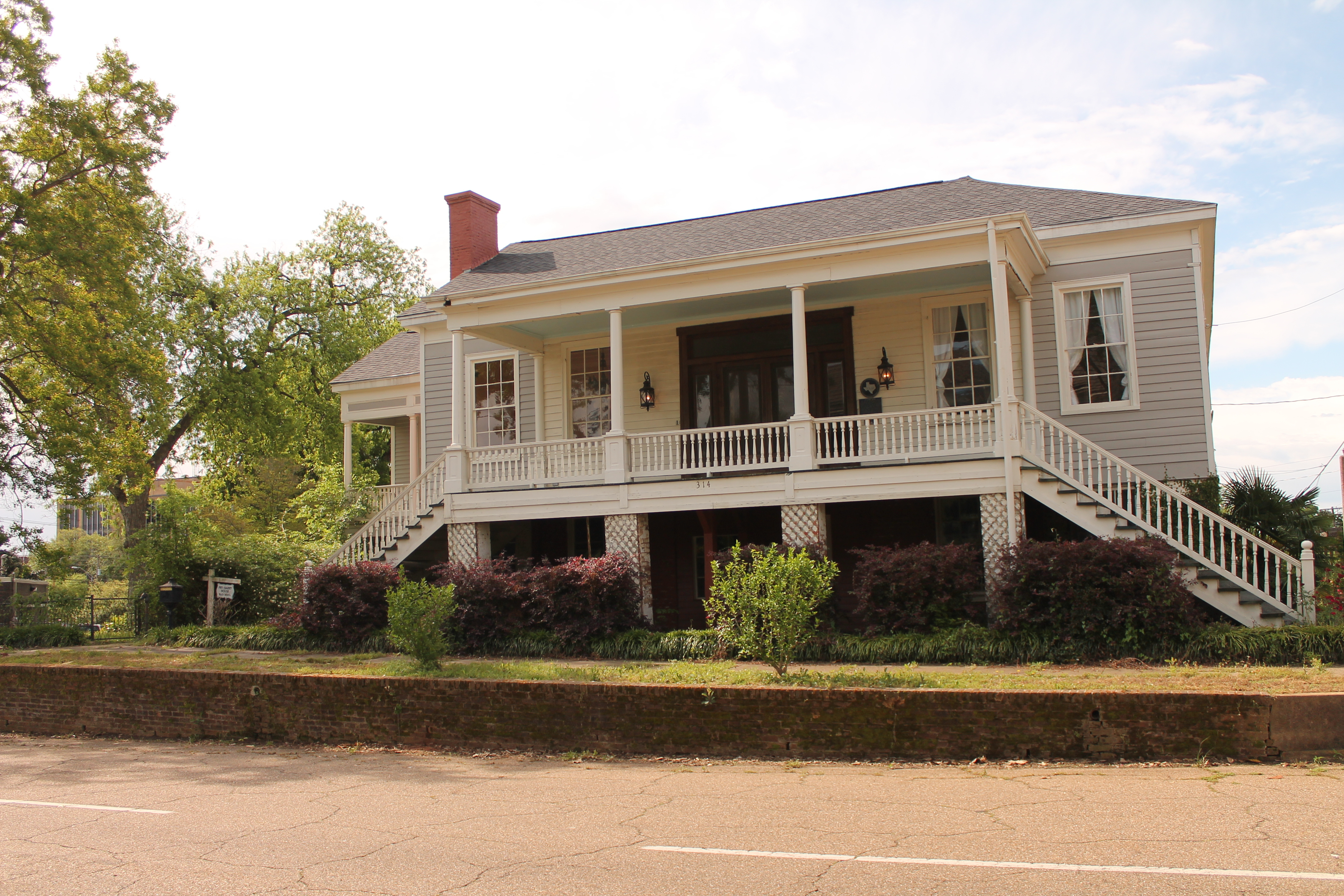
- Fry-Barry House in 2015

- Location within Texas Location within the United States
- Location: 314 W. Austin, Marshall, Texas
- Coordinates: 32°32′44″N 94°22′11″W
- Area: less than one acre
- Built: 1853
- Built by: W.R.D. Ward
- Architectural style: Greek Revival
- NRHP reference No.: 78002950
- RTHL No.: 10162

Significant dates
- Added to NRHP: November 21, 1978
- Designated RTHL: 1962

The Fry-Barry House is a one-story, brick and frame house located at 314 W. Austin in Marshall, Texas. Built in 1860 the house is one of the oldest homes in Marshall. It was designed by W.R.D. Ward, a planter and merchant who also designed Magnolia Hall. Major Edwin James Fry, a businessman and banker, purchased the house in 1872. When Fry died in 1927, his daughter, Pamela and her husband, Walter L. Barry inherited the house. Mary Louise Barry inherited the house in 1961.

The house is currently owned by Joslin Marshall.

The house was made a Recorded Texas Historic Landmark and a historic marker was installed in 1962. It was also listed as a National Register of Historic Places in 1979.

== See also ==
- National Register of Historic Places listings in Harrison County, Texas
- Recorded Texas Historic Landmarks in Harrison County
