= Sam B. Hall Jr. Federal Building and United States Courthouse =

- Marshall U.S. Post Office
- U.S. National Register of Historic Places
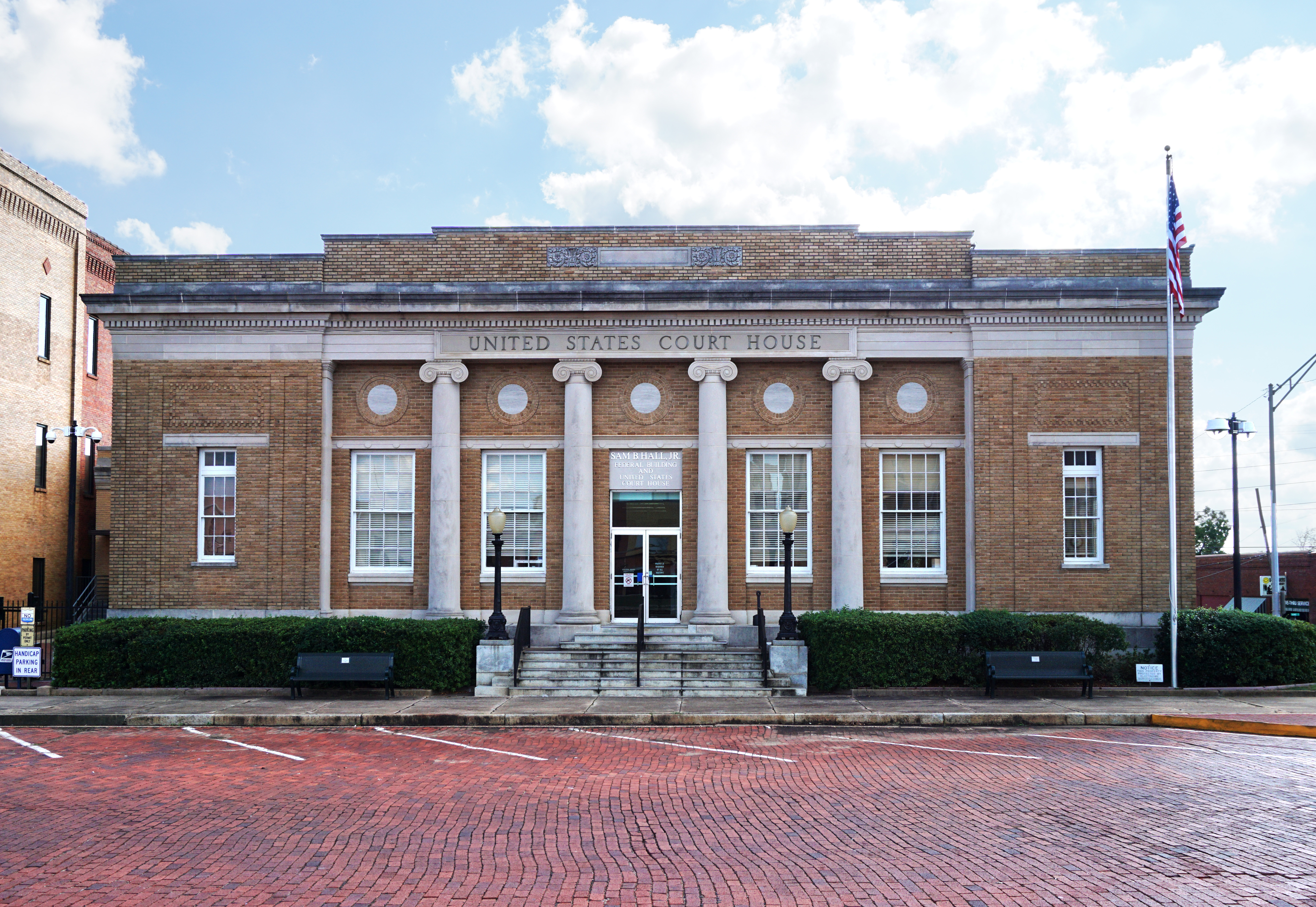
- Marshall Federal Building in 2009

- Location within Texas Location within the United States
- Interactive map showing the location for Marshall Federal Building
- Location: 100 E. Houston St., Marshall, Texas
- Coordinates: 32°32′39″N 94°22′3″W
- Area: 1 acre (0.40 ha)
- Built: 1915
- Architects: Oscar Wenderoth, George Shaul
- Architectural style: Classical Revival
- NRHP reference No.: 01000435
- Added to NRHP: April 25, 2001

The Sam B. Hall Jr. Federal Building and United States Courthouse, formerly known as the Marshall Federal Building and U.S. Post Office, was built in 1915. It is a Classical Revival building designed by Oscar Wenderoth (supervising architect) and George Shaul.

It is used as a courthouse by the U.S. District Court for the Eastern District of Texas. The courthouse was renamed in 1994 to honor state representative and district judge Sam B. Hall Jr. It was listed on the National Register of Historic Places in 2001.

== See also ==
- National Register of Historic Places listings in Harrison County, Texas
- List of United States federal courthouses in Texas
