= Marvin Methodist Episcopal Church, South =

Historic church in Texas, United States

- U.S. National Register of Historic Places
- Recorded Texas Historic Landmark
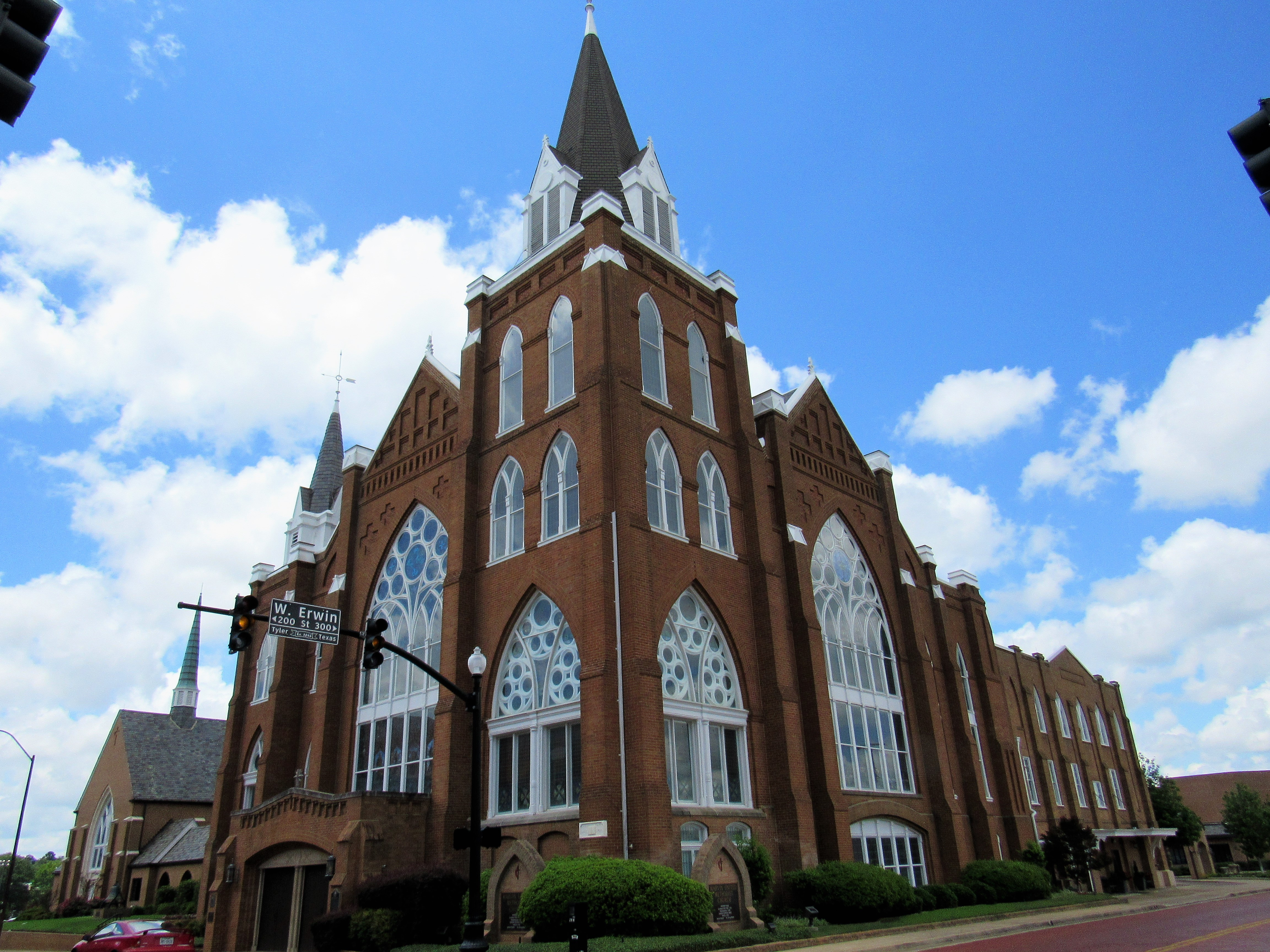
- Marvin Methodist in 2017

- Location within Texas Location within the United States
- Location: 300 W. Erwin St., Tyler, Texas
- Coordinates: 32°21′1″N 95°18′11″W
- Area: 1.8 acres (0.73 ha)
- Built: 1890
- Architect: Matison P. Baker, et al.
- Architectural style: Late Gothic Revival
- NRHP reference No.: 00001385
- RTHL No.: 7741

Significant dates
- Added to NRHP: November 15, 2000
- Designated RTHL: 1968

Marvin Methodist Episcopal Church, South (currently called Marvin Methodist Church or just Marvin Church) is a historic church at 300 W. Erwin Street in Tyler, Texas.

The original parts of the building including the current sanctuary were built in 1890 and added to the National Register of Historic Places in 2000.

Currently known as Marvin Methodist Church (or just Marvin Church) the church grew from the first Methodist Movement in Tyler. Belonging originally to the Methodist Episcopal Church(South) (and its successors The Methodist Church and The United Methodist Church), today it fellowships with the Global Methodist Church

== See also ==
- National Register of Historic Places listings in Smith County, Texas
- Recorded Texas Historic Landmarks in Smith County
