= Mimosa Hall (Leigh, Texas) =

Historic house in Texas, United States

- U.S. National Register of Historic Places
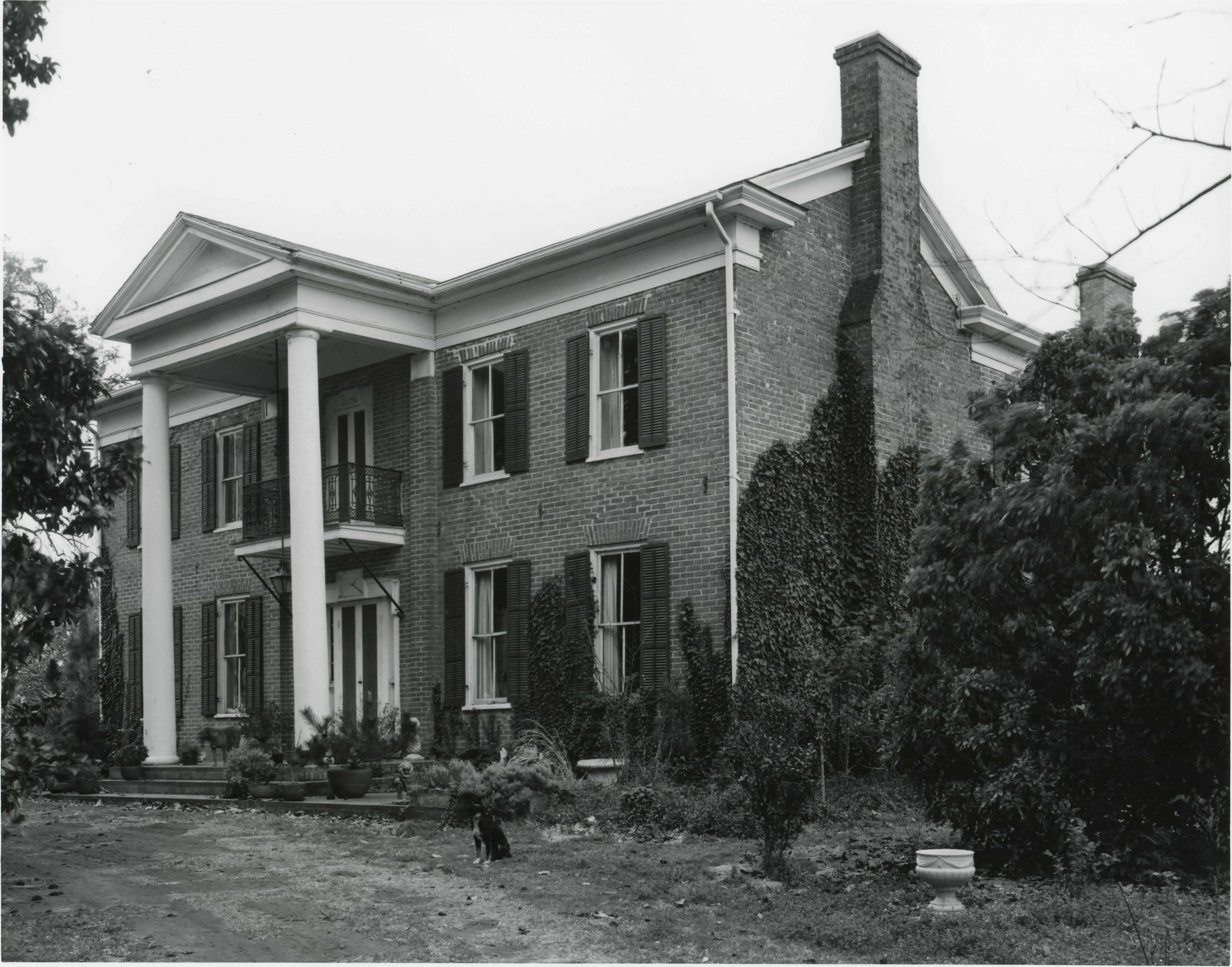
- Mimosa Hall in 2017

- Location within Texas Location within the United States
- Location: 9403 FM 134, Leigh, Texas
- Coordinates: 32°35′19″N 94°8′37″W
- Area: 6 acres (2.4 ha)
- Built: 1844
- Architect: John Johnston Webster
- Architectural style: Greek Revival
- NRHP reference No.: 78002949
- Added to NRHP: November 2, 1978

Mimosa Hall is the name of a plantation house in Leigh, Texas. John J. Webster built Mimosa Hall in 1844. Webster, born in Alabama in 1796, the son of a revolutionary soldier, was an architect. Webster moved to Texas in 1839 with his wife, Miriam Webster, and their children.

== History ==
Mimosa Hall was the first brick house in Harrison County, originally situated in the middle of 7,000 acres (28 km^{2}) of land. Enslaved people made all of the bricks and cut all of the lumber on the plantation. The plantation was primarily used for planting.

The family cemetery was on the property adjoining the house. Nestled two miles (3 km) back in the woods, an old brick wall on the top of a knoll surrounds the cemetery. The original family was all buried there, and their descendants still maintain the cemetery.

The American Museum in Britain has in its permanent collection a quilt made by people enslaved on the Mimosa Hall Plantation. The quilt, c. 1860, is called "The Chalice."

== Current ==
Today the house sits in the middle of 150 acres (0.61 km^{2}) and is a private residence. It is registered in the National Register of Historic Places, along with its sister home in nearby Karnack, Texas, which was the birthplace of Lady Bird Johnson. The plantation stayed in the original family until the 1980s when Douglas Blocker sold it. Mimosa Hall was then a bed and breakfast for several years until its owners purchased it to use as a private residence.

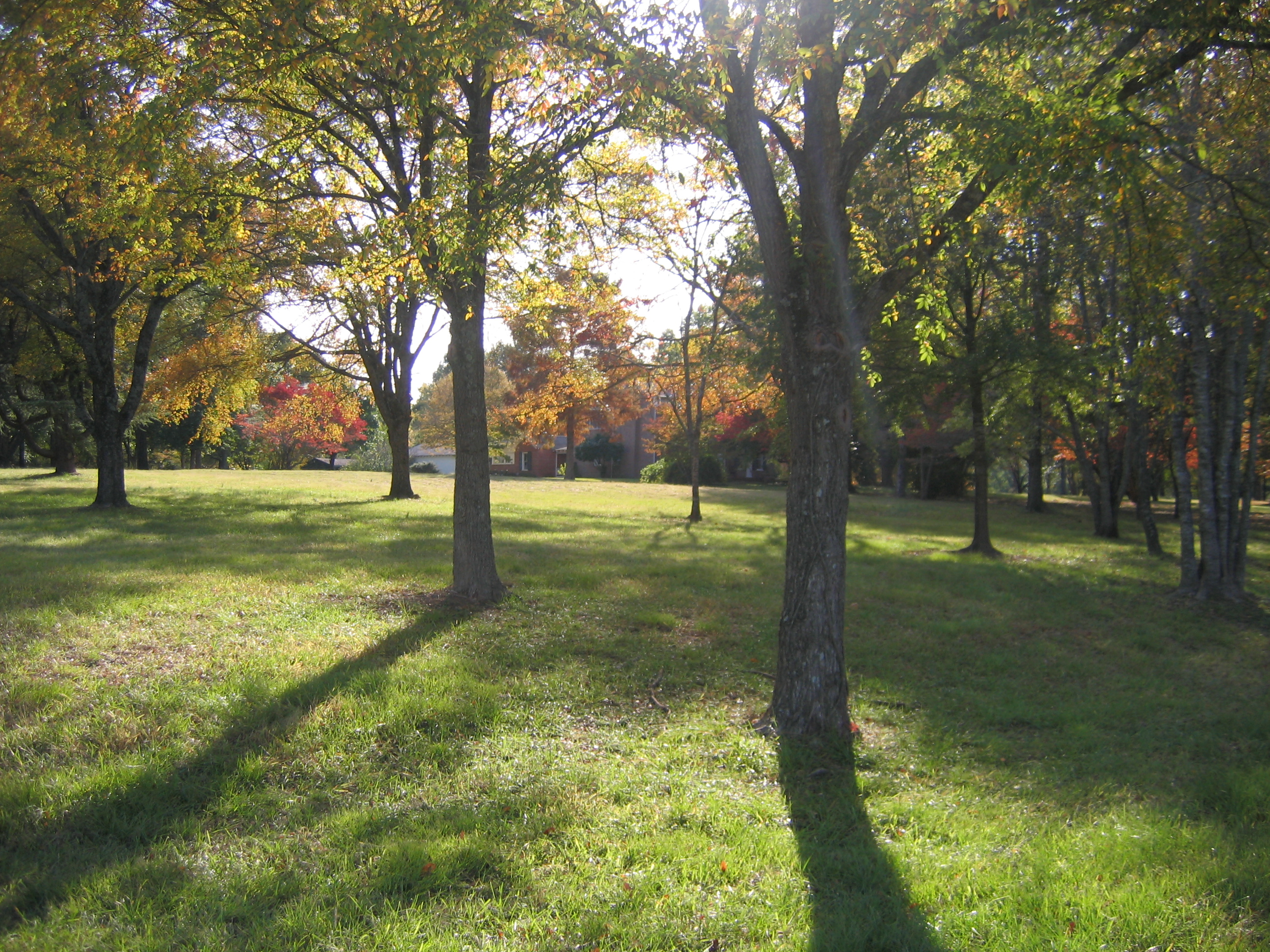

== See also ==
- National Register of Historic Places listings in Harrison County, Texas
