= Pin Hook, Texas =

Unincorporated community in Texas, US

Coordinates: 33°48′34″N 95°19′10″W

Pin Hook is an unincorporated community located in northeast Lamar County, east of Paris, Texas.

== Notable persons ==
- William A. Owens, author, educator and folklorist.
