= Weisman-Hirsch House =

- U.S. National Register of Historic Places
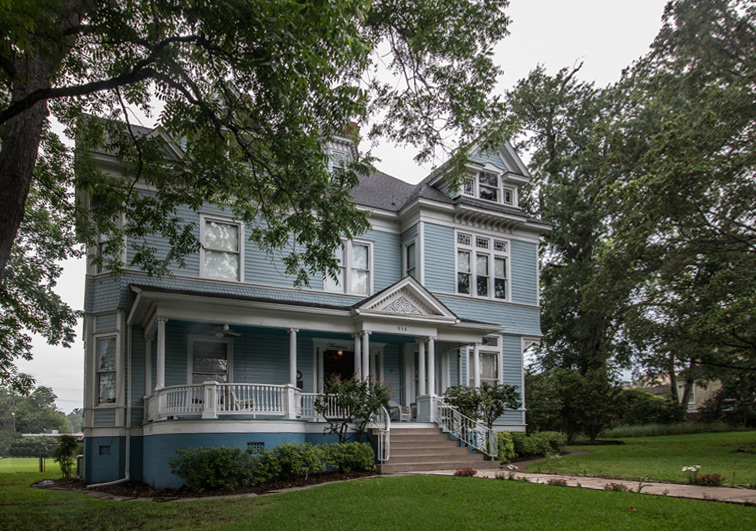
- The house in 2017
- Location: Marshall, Texas
- Built: 1901
- Architect: C. G. Lancaster
- Architectural style: Queen Anne and Colonial Revival
- NRHP reference No.: 83004488
- Added to NRHP: July 7, 1983

The Weisman-Hirsch House is a historic home located in Marshall, Texas.

== History ==
It is a two-and-a-half story frame structure home built with Queen Anne and Colonial Revival elements. The house was built in 1900 for Joe Weisman, a leader in the city's Jewish community. The house was recognized with a Texas Historical Marker in 1979 and listed on the National Register of Historic Places in 1983.
