= Goodman–LeGrand House =

Historic house in Texas, United States

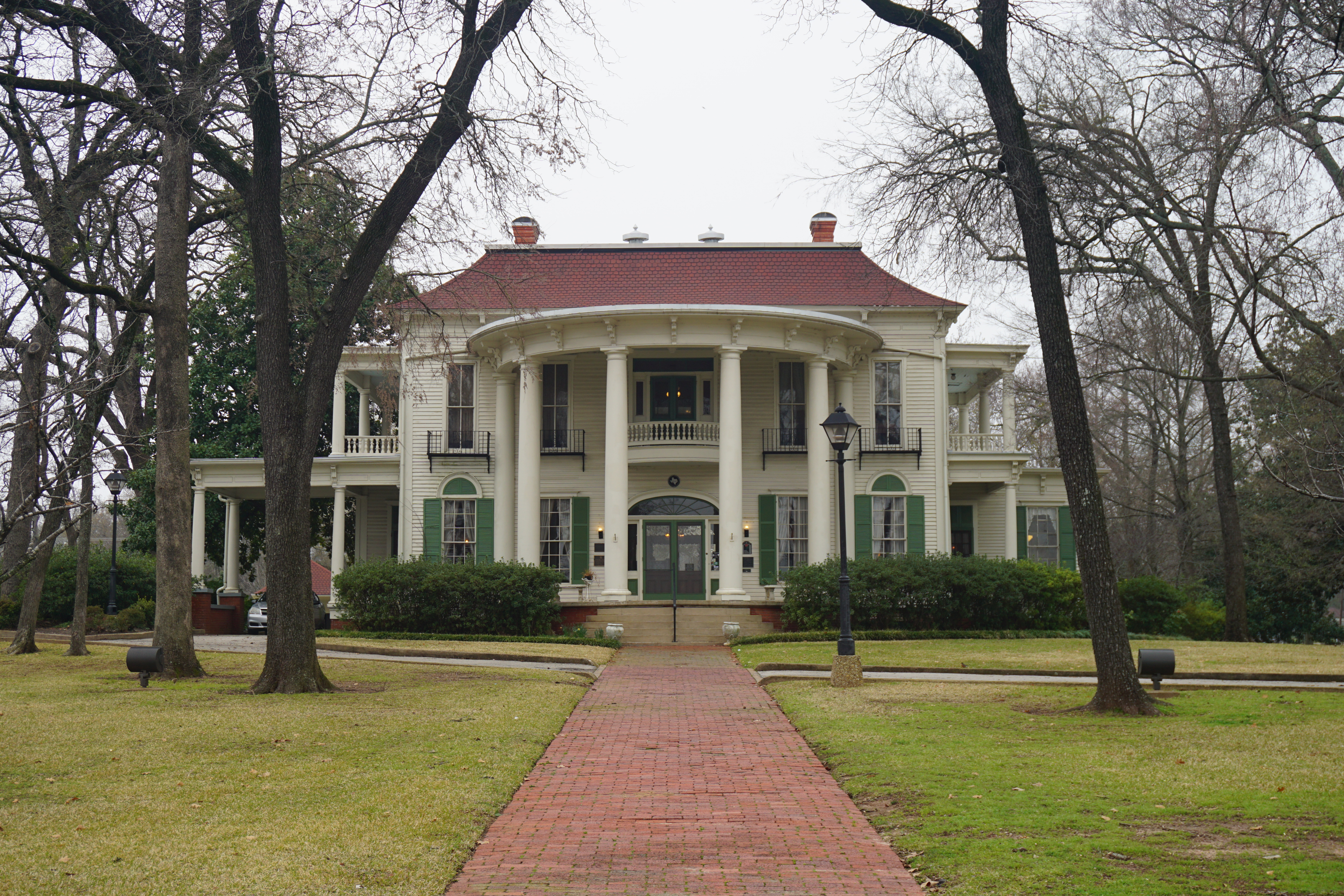
- Goodman–LeGrand House in 2019

- Goodman–LeGrand House (the United States)
- Established: 1940
- Location: 624 N. Broadway; Tyler, Texas
- Coordinates: 32°21′24″N 95°18′5″W
- Type: Historic house Park and gardens
- Architect: Samuel Gallatin Smith
- Website: Goodman-LeGrand Museum & Gardens
- Goodman–LeGrand House
- U.S. National Register of Historic Places
- Texas State Antiquities Landmark
- Recorded Texas Historic Landmark
- Area: 9 acres (3.6 ha)
- Built: 1859
- Architectural style: Classical Revival
- NRHP reference No.: 76002066
- TSAL No.: 8200000565
- RTHL No.: 7730

Significant dates
- Added to NRHP: November 7, 1976
- Designated TSAL: January 1, 1981
- Designated RTHL: 1962

The Goodman–LeGrand house and museum is located at 624 North Broadway, in the city of Tyler, county of Smith in the U.S. state of Texas. It was added to the National Register of Historic Places listings in Smith County in 1976, and has been a Recorded Texas Historic Landmark since 1962. The Daughters of the American Revolution designated it an Historic Site in 2010.

== History ==
Named Bonnie Castle by original owner Samuel Gallatin Smith, the Greek Revival cottage was built in 1859 on a parcel of 9 acres (3.64 ha; 0.01 sq mi) in Tyler. Smith joined the Confederate States Army in 1861 and sold Bonnie Castle to local Tyler teacher F.N. Gary, who never resided in the house. After the 1862 Capture of New Orleans, Gary made the house available to numerous families of refugees fleeing the Union Army.

Gary sold the house to retired physician Samuel A. Goodman in 1866. In 1872, Goodman's physician son William J. Goodman purchased the house for $3,000 and moved in with his wife Priscilla Gaston Goodman. William and Priscilla raised four children in the house, and in 1880 added a second floor to the structure. Victorian double galleries were also added on all sides of the house.

The Goodman daughter Sallie continued to live in the home with her husband James Hutcheson LeGrand after their 1893 marriage. The couple was active in local civic affairs, providing their home as a gather place for several charitable and social events. They were ardent supporters of the Tyler rose festival. Their only son died at age 2 in 1896. When William Goodman died in 1921, Sallie inherited the house. The LeGrands completely remodeled the house in 1926 to the current Classic revival style. The current semi-circular porticos were added during this remodeling.

== Museum ==
James Hutcheson LeGrand died in 1935. Upon her death on October 12, 1939, Sallie LeGrand bequeathed the house and all her personal journals to the City of Tyler. It officially became the city's property in 1940. In 1962, the house became a Recorded Texas Historic Landmark. In 1976, the house was placed on the National Register of Historic Places Listings in Smith County. The Daughters of the American Revolution designated the house a national Historic Site in 2010. A major renovation of the house was begun in 2010 and was completed in 2011.

=== Hours, admission ===
The house and grounds are maintained by the City of Tyler. The museum is open to the walk-in public 10 a.m. – 4 p.m,.five days a week. It is closed on Sunday and Monday. The LeGrand Park & Gardens is open to the public 8 a.m. – 5 p.m, seven days a week. Admission is free, but a donation is suggested.

== Gallery ==
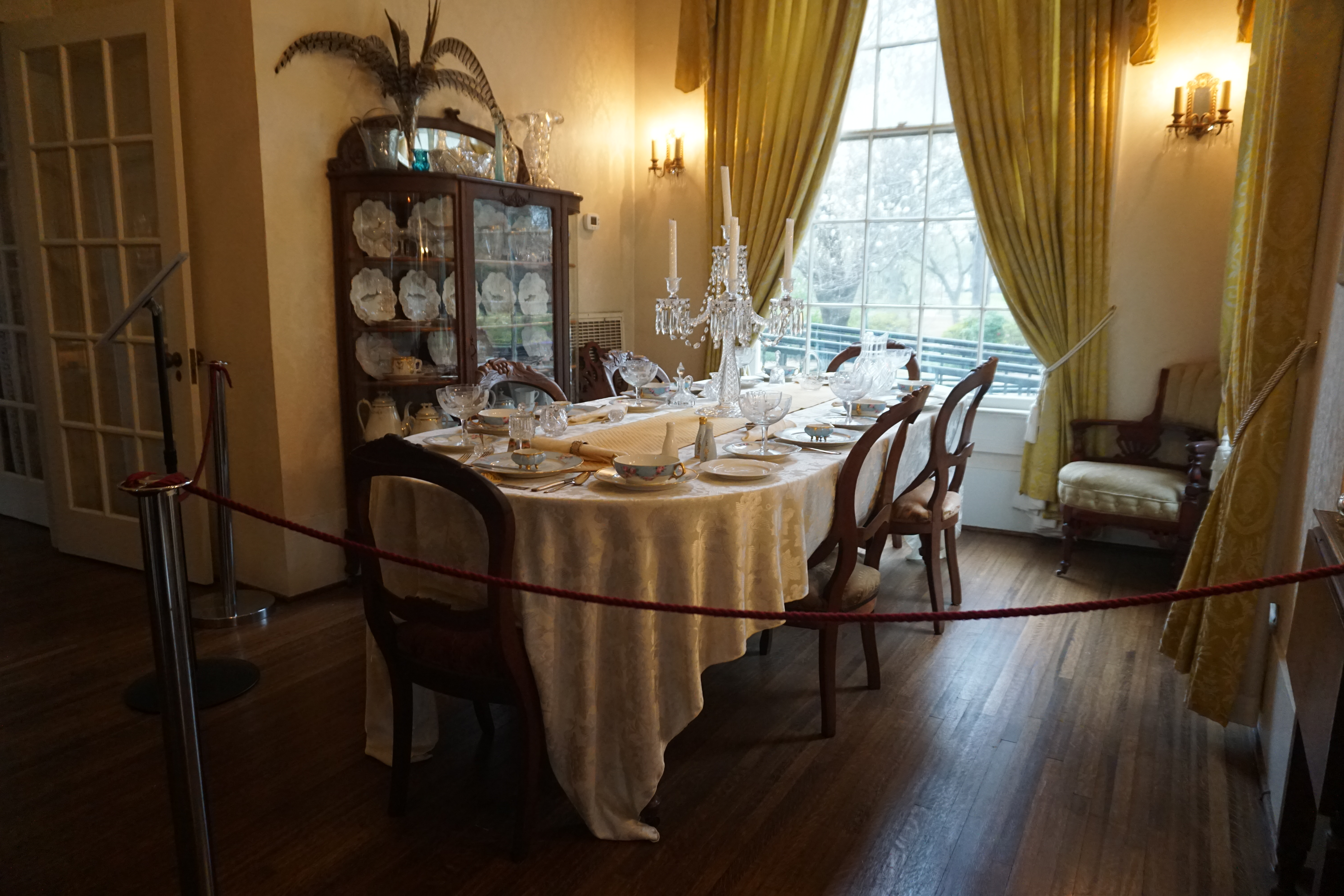
Dining room

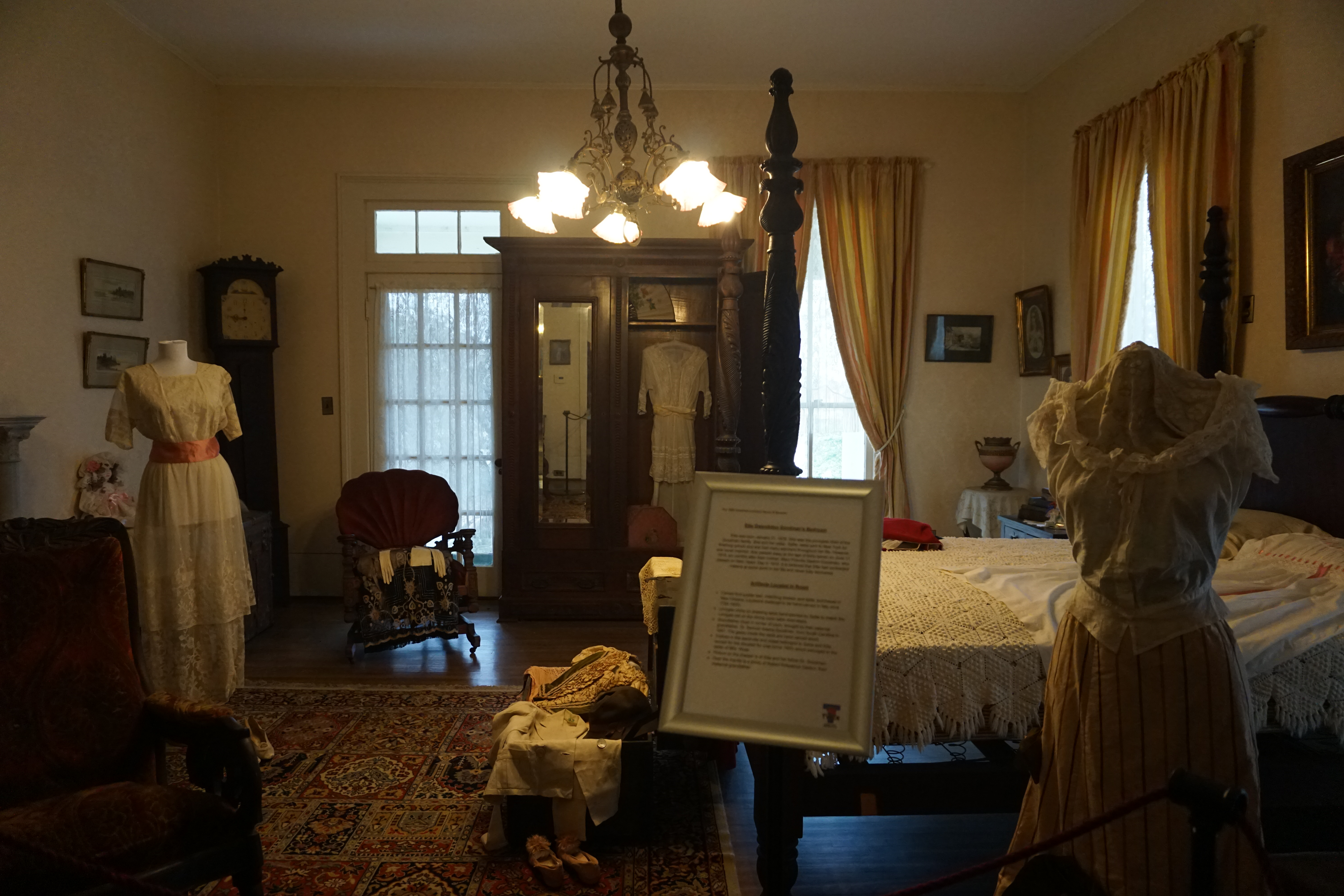
Etta Gwendolyn Goodman's bedroom

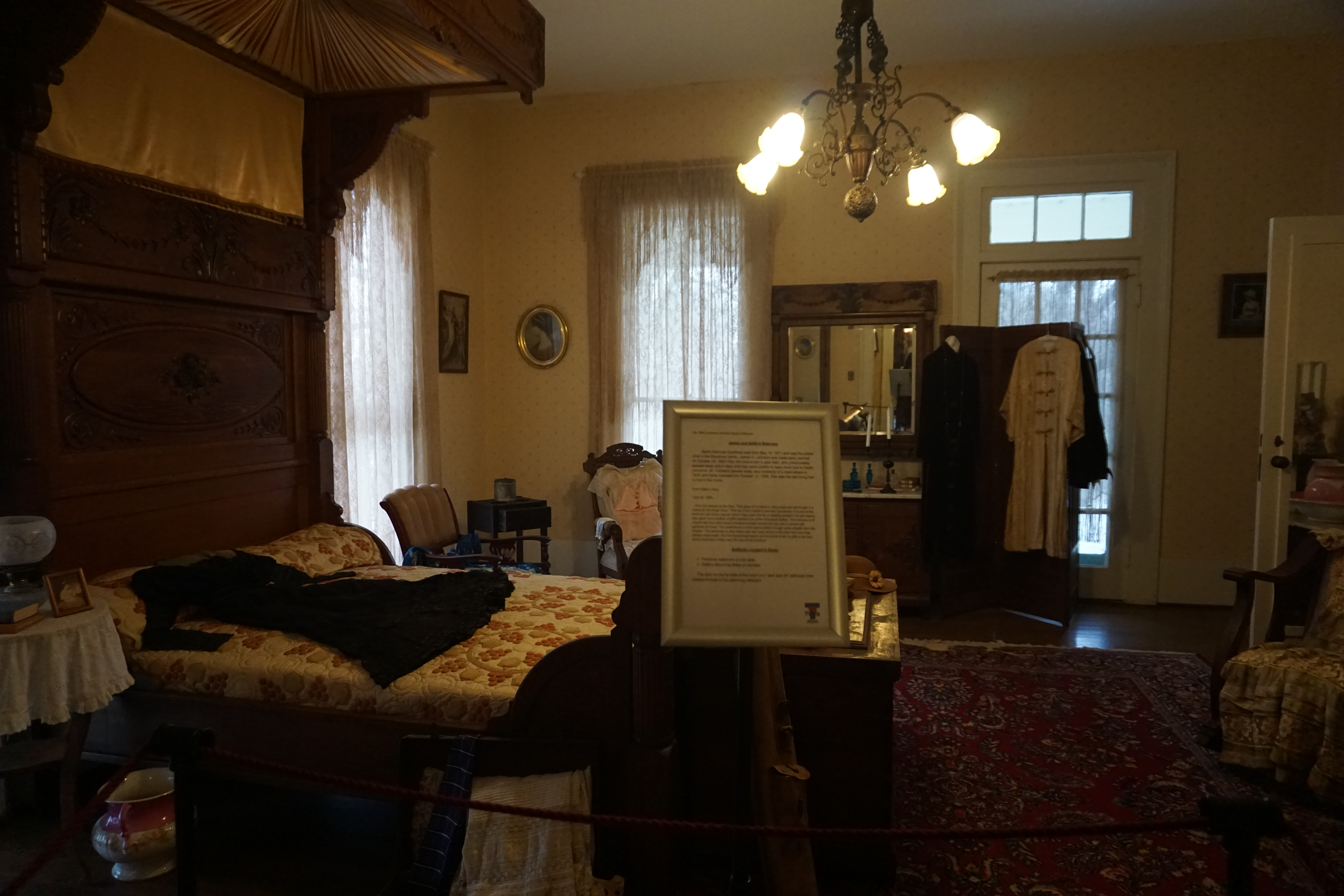
James and Sallie LeGrand's bedroom

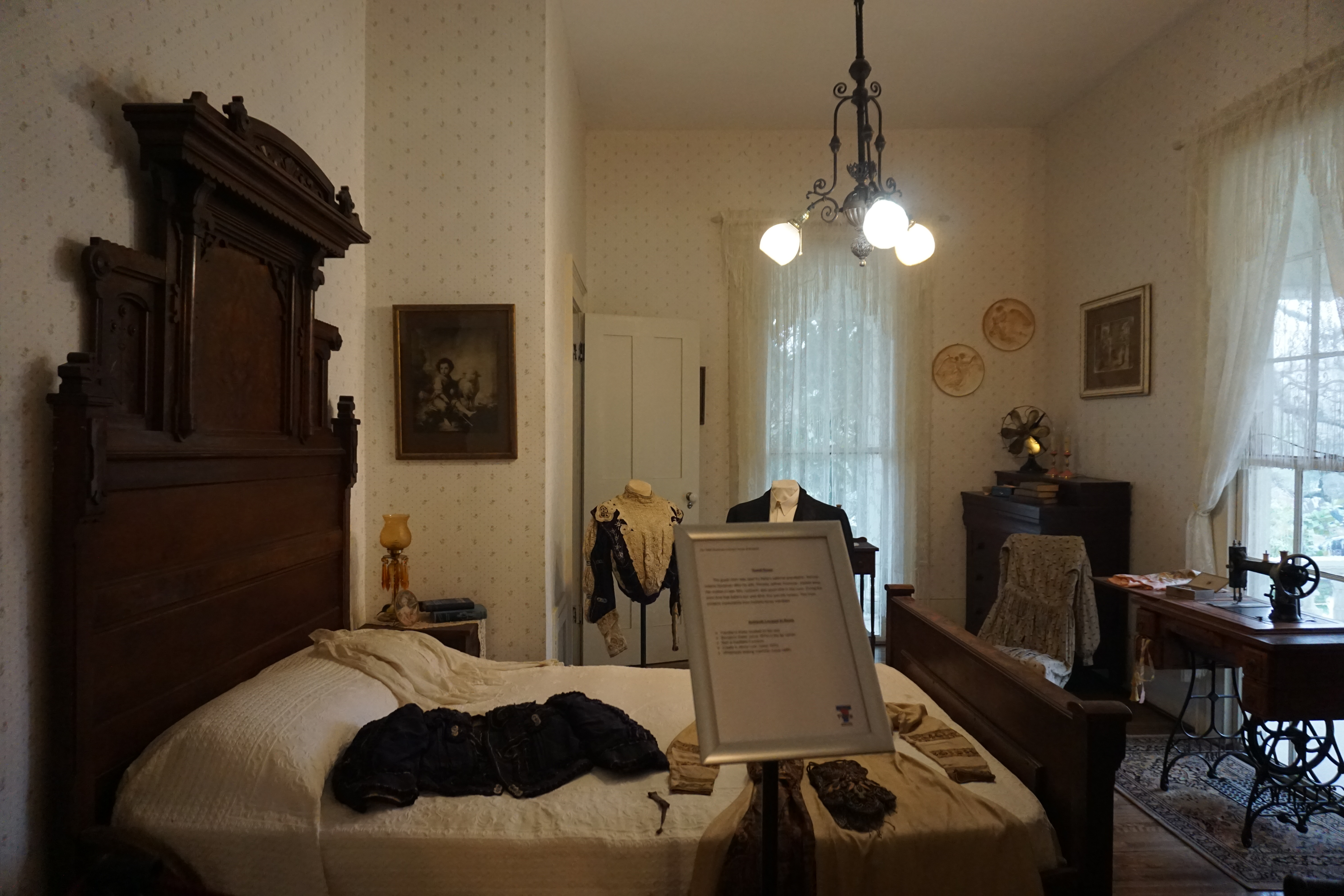
Guest room

== See also ==
- Carnegie History Center
- Cotton Belt Depot Train Museum
- List of museums in East Texas
- Tyler Museum of Art
- Whitaker–McClendon House
- National Register of Historic Places listings in Smith County, Texas
- Recorded Texas Historic Landmarks in Smith County
