= Tyler Museum of Art =

Museum in Tyler, Texas, United States

- Location within Texas
- Established: 1971
- Coordinates: 32.3304°N 95.2819°W
- Type: Contemporary; Texas artists Mexican folk art
- Website: Tyler Museum of Art

The Tyler Museum of Art is a museum located at 1300 South Mahon Avenue in the city of Tyler, county of Smith in the U.S. state of Texas. It is a private corporation accredited by the American Alliance of Museums, encouraging art education in the community. Its permanent collection includes Texas artists.

== Background ==
The first half of the 20th century saw Tyler, Texas and its surrounding area grow in population as the flower industry and the oil exploration industry boosted the local economy. Camp Fannin during World War II, and later manufacturing plants, also attributed to the local economy and its resulting population growth.

A dedicated group of local citizens saw the need for an art museum to serve the expanding population. By 1952, no such museum existed within a 100 miles (160 km) radius of Tyler. In order to supplement art education in the local school system, the Community Arts Committee was formed by the Tyler Service League. For the next eight years, a group of volunteer League women who called themselves the Picture Ladies formed a type of mobile museum. They took pictures to classrooms on a weekly basis. From 1960 to 1965, the League's efforts took on a semi-permanence with the purchase of a local house to serve as the Tyler museum's first home. Proceeds from the 1965 sale of the house went towards what would become the structure that is today known as the Tyler Museum of Art. In 1969, the Tyler Service League changed its name and was chartered as the non-profit Tyler Junior League.

== Museum ==
The architectural firm of E. Davis Wilcox and Associates designed the new 17,000 square feet (1,600 m^{2}) two-story museum, which had its grand opening on April 1, 1971, on the east side of the Tyler Junior College. Three galleries are contained within the building, two 2,000 square feet (190 m^{2}) galleries and a smaller 1,000 square feet (93 m^{2}) gallery.

Since 1971, the museum has acquired over 1,500 works for its permanent collection. Encouragement is given to local student artists through the museum's sponsorship of the annual high school art exhibition. Tours, workshops, lectures, films and talks are offered throughout the year. Past events include a Texas Writers' Series. Members of the public are encouraged to apply as Docents.

The museum is accredited by the American Alliance of Museums. A board of trustees oversees the activities of the museum. Funding comes from public contributions and some local municipality assistance. The local school district financially supports the educational endeavors at the museum.

== Hours and admission ==
The museum is open Tuesday-Saturday: 10 am-5pm, Sunday: 1pm-5pm, closed Mondays and holidays admission fee applies. The on-site TMA Café serves lunch, and there is a museum shop.

== See also ==
- Carnegie History Center
- Cotton Belt Depot Train Museum
- Goodman-LeGrand House
- List of museums in East Texas
- Whitaker-McClendon House
