= Cotton Belt Depot Museum =

Museum in Tyler, Texas, US

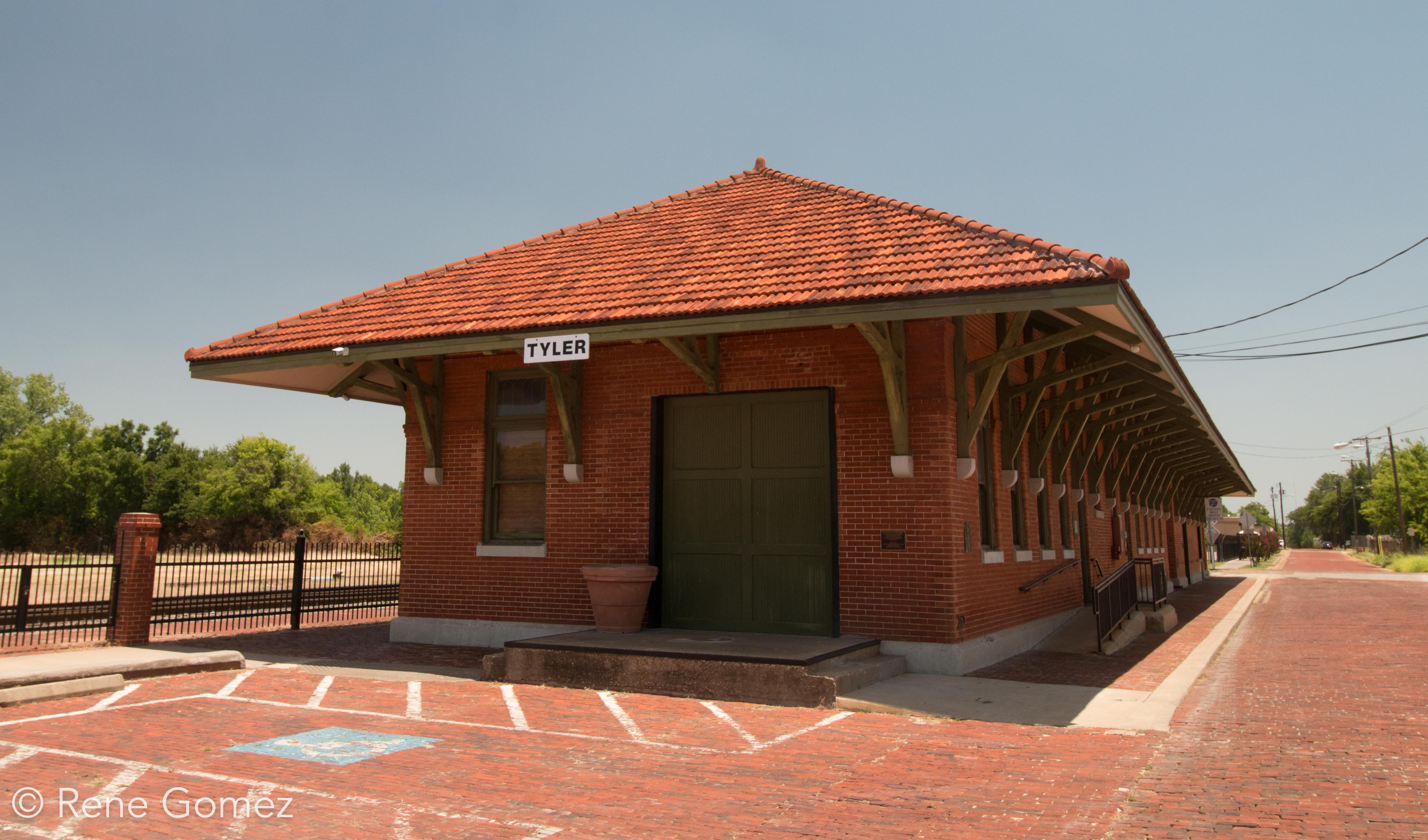
- Cotton Belt Depot Museum in 2018

- Cotton Belt Depot Museum (the United States)
- Location: 210 E. Oakwood St., Tyler, Texas
- Coordinates: 32°21′15″N 95°17′52″W
- Type: Model trains Railroad memorabilia
- Website: Cotton Belt Depot Museum Tyler Texas
- St. Louis Southwestern Railway (Cotton Belt) Passenger Depot
- U.S. National Register of Historic Places
- Area: less than one acre
- Built: 1905
- Built by: St. Louis Southwestern Railway
- Architectural style: Prairie School, et.al.
- MPS: Tyler, Texas MPS
- NRHP reference No.: 01000873
- Added to NRHP: August 8, 2001

The Cotton Belt Depot Museum is located in the historic railroad depot in Tyler, Texas, United States.

== History ==
Tyler, Texas, had been a railroad hub since the Houston and Great Northern first came through the town in 1873. The depot was opened in 1905. The passenger service ceased in April 1956 and it has been used for different purposes until it was donated to the City of Tyler in 1988. In 2003, following a major renovation the space was shared by the Tyler Transit Department and the museum. Tyler Transit occupies the waiting area and the museum occupies what used to be the baggage storage area.

The museum is run by the Cotton Belt Rail Historical Society Tyler Tap Chapter, which was part of the Cotton Belt Rail Historical Society before breaking off to form a separate organization.

== Museum ==
The model train collection of Mr. and Mrs. Clyde Bragg is the bulk of the hands-on exhibit. Other artifacts and memorabilia have been donated by various individuals.

== Gallery ==
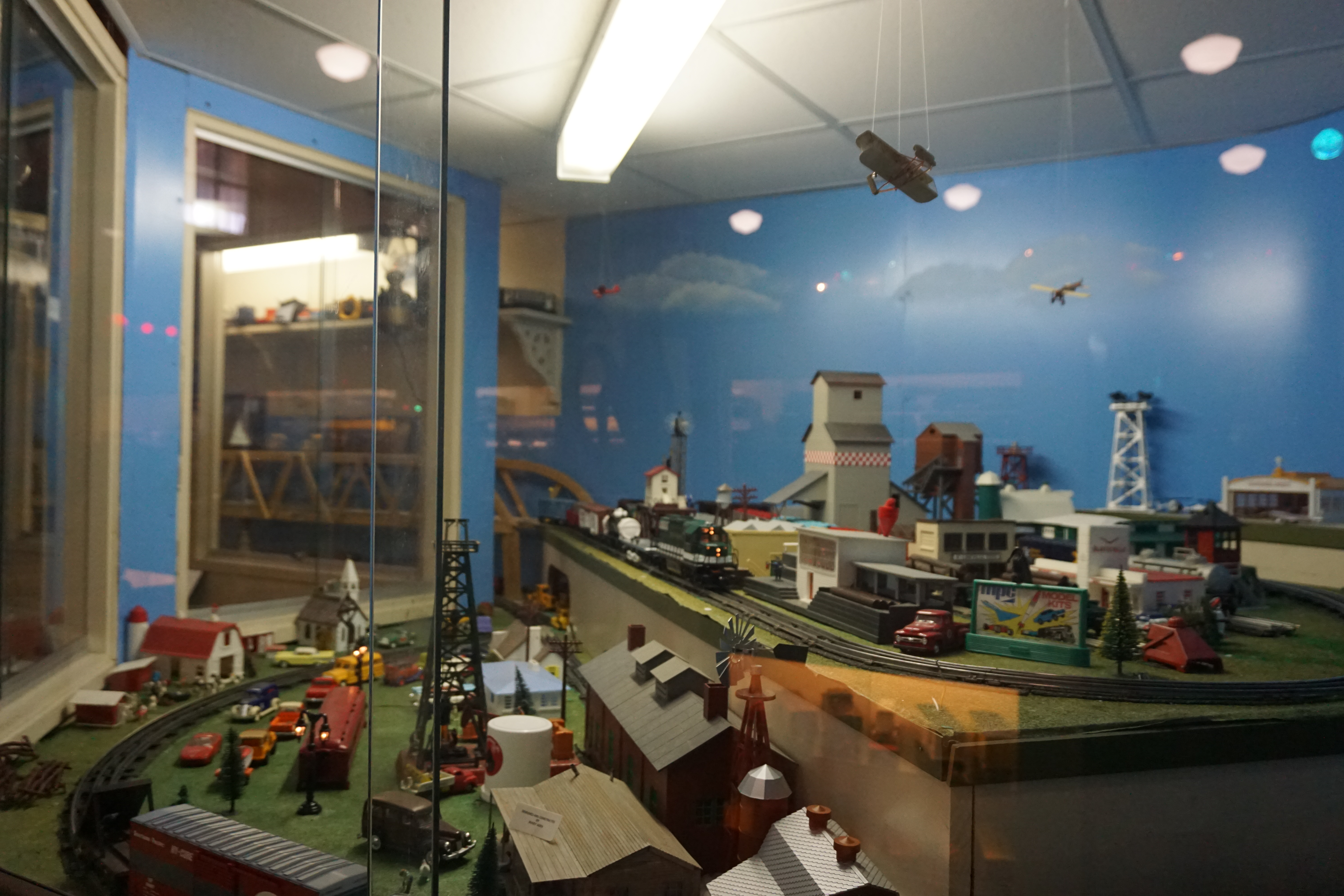
O-scale model railway layout

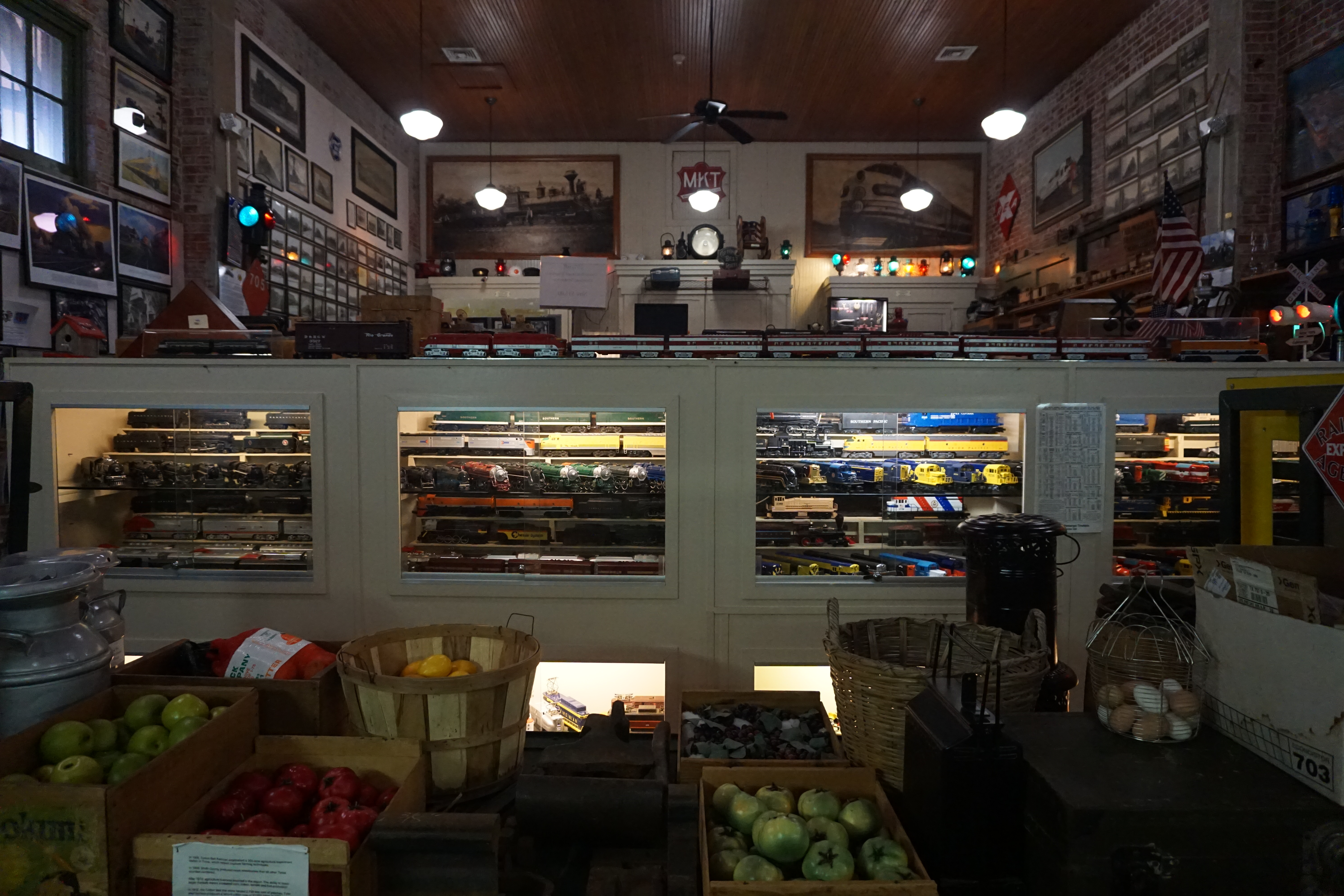
Interior

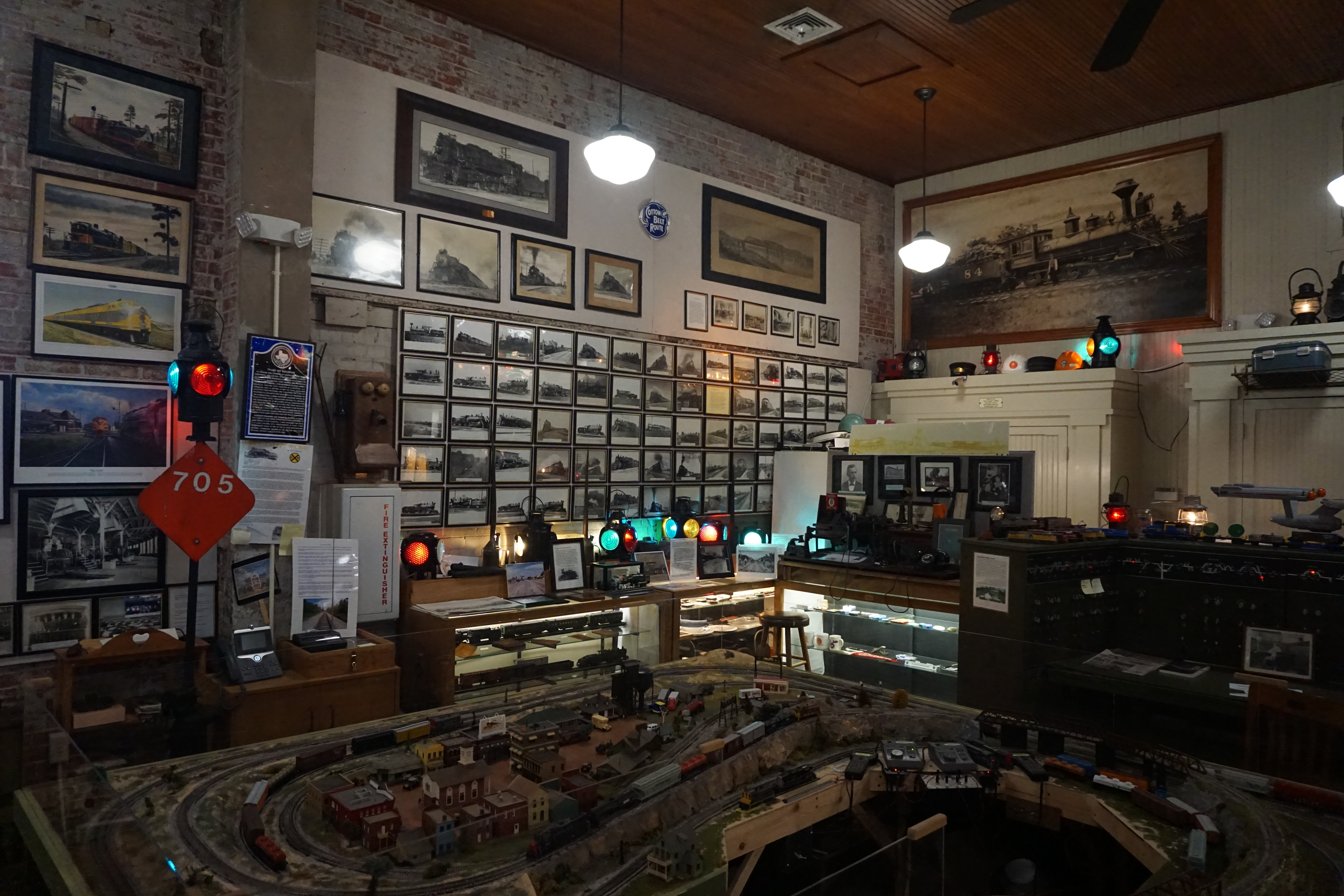
Interior

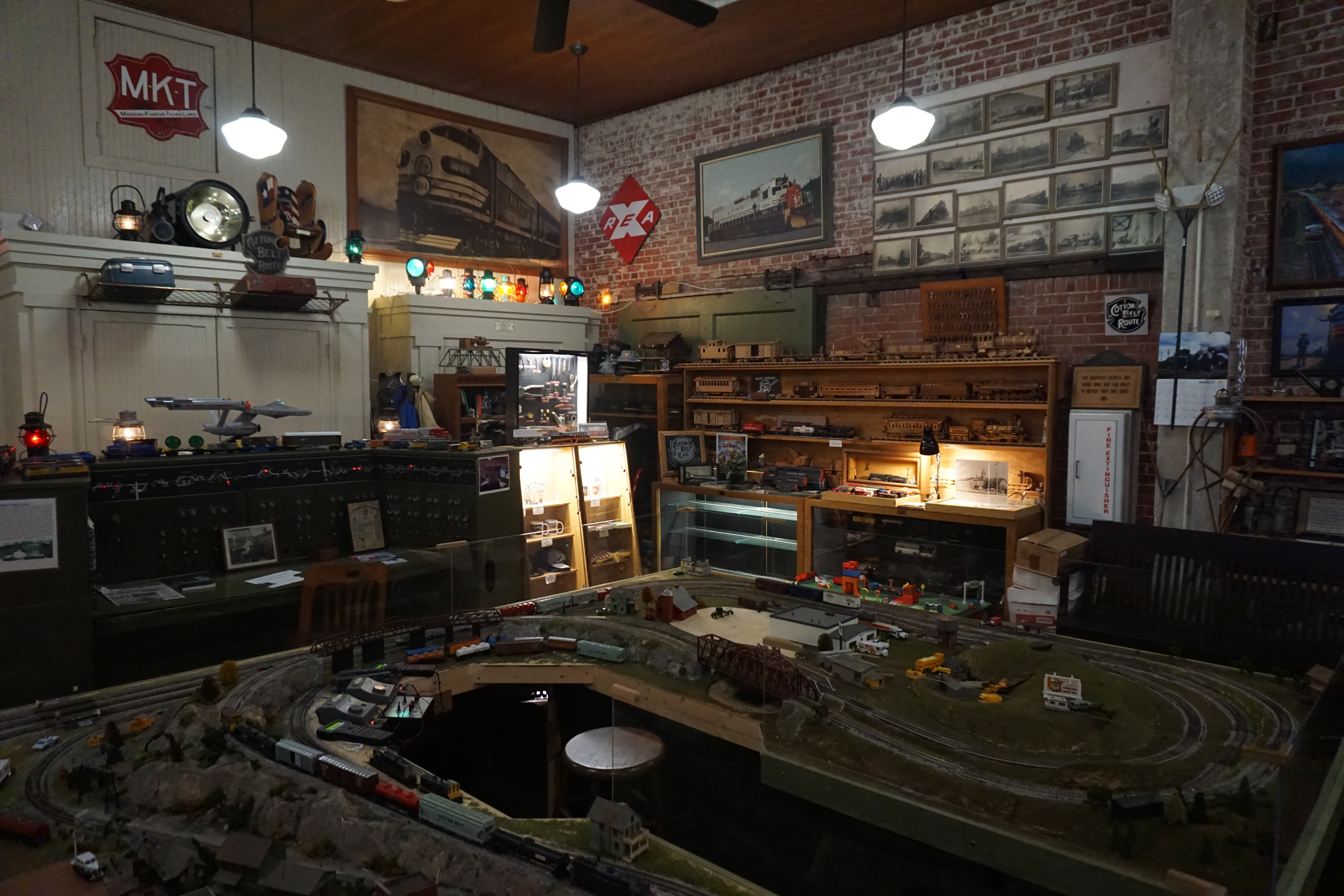
Interior

== See also ==
- Carnegie History Center
- Goodman-LeGrand House
- List of museums in East Texas
- St. Louis Southwestern Railway
- Tyler Museum of Art
- Whitaker-McClendon House
- National Register of Historic Places listings in Smith County, Texas

Preceding station	St. Louis Southwestern Railway	Following station
Brownsboro toward Gatesville	Main Line	Big Sandy toward St. Louis
