= Sarah McClendon =

American journalist (1910–2003)

Sarah Newcomb McClendon
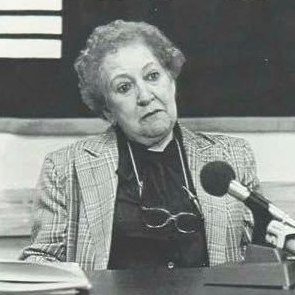
- McClendon circa 1984
- Born: July 8, 1910; Tyler, Texas, U.S.
- Died: January 8, 2003 (aged 92); Washington, D.C., U.S.
- Occupation: Journalist
- Spouse: John Thomas O'Brien (deceased)
- Children: Sally Newcomb MacDonald

Sarah Newcomb McClendon (July 8, 1910 – January 8, 2003) was a long-time White House reporter who covered presidential politics for a half century. McClendon founded her own freelance news service as a single mother in the post-World War II era, and became known as a model for women in the press and as a vocal advocate of various causes, particularly those of United States military veterans. McClendon was best known, however, for posing sharp, blunt questions at United States presidential press conferences.

== Early life ==
The youngest of nine children, McClendon was born July 8, 1910, and reared in Tyler, Texas. McClendon's birthplace is listed on the National Register of Historic Places listings in Smith County, is a Recorded Texas Historic Landmark and a Tyler Historical Landmark.

McClendon graduated from Tyler Junior College in 1928, and from the University of Missouri's School of Journalism in 1931.

After graduation, McClendon worked for the Tyler Courier-Times, the Tyler Morning Telegraph where she covered the New London School explosion, and for The Beaumont Enterprise. As a reporter for the Beaumont Enterprise, McClendon wrote a series of articles criticizing the Women's Army Auxililiary Corps—the very branch of the service in which she would soon enlist.

== Career ==
=== Military career ===
With America's entry into World War II, McClendon volunteered to serve in the United States Army. After learning that she did not have the academic qualifications to join military intelligence, McClendon enlisted in the Women's Army Auxililiary Corps, and reported for duty in September, 1942. McClendon initially served in the WAAC's public relations department, then attended Officer Candidate School, was promoted to Lieutenant and eventually was assigned the Army Surgeon General's office as a public relations officer.,

After insisting on her full rights and privileges as a first lieutenant, McClendon was the first Army officer to give birth at a military hospital, Walter Reed Hospital. As a result of the pregnancy, McClendon was honorably discharged from the military, also in June 1944. A single mother, McClendon used her Washington, D.C., press connections to obtain a job as a Washington correspondent, starting work the same month as her daughter's birth.

=== Washington, D.C. career ===
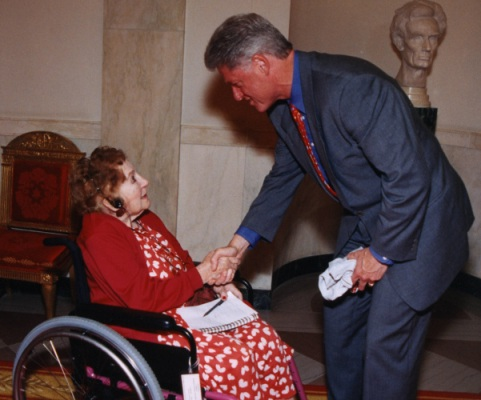
Sarah McClendon and Bill Clinton

In June 1944, after McClendon's discharge from the Women's Army Corps, famed newspaperman Bascom N. Timmons hired McClendon as a Washington, D.C., correspondent for the Philadelphia Daily News. In 1946, when Timmons discharged McClendon to make room for reporters returning from service in World War II, McClendon started her own service, the McClendon News Service, which provided Washington dispatches and columns to member newspapers and personal subscribers. A single mother, McClendon often brought her young daughter to news conferences.

For the next several decades, McClendon attended White House press conferences on behalf of the McClendon News Service.

== Activism ==
In 1977, McClendon became an associate of the Women's Institute for Freedom of the Press (WIFP). WIFP is an American nonprofit publishing organization. The organization works to increase communication between women and connect the public with forms of women-based media.

In May 2001, Sarah McClendon gave her sponsorship to the Disclosure Project press conference held by Dr. Steven Greer at the National Press Club in Washington, D.C., where 20 retired Air Force, Federal Aviation Administration and intelligence officers reported on the seriousness of the topic of UFOs.

== Personal life ==
While in the service, McClendon met and was briefly married to John Thomas O'Brien. O'Brien, a paper salesman, abandoned McClendon before the birth of their daughter and died during World War II. McClendon later described O'Brien as an alcoholic who "had little to recommend him but my own loneliness". The couple's daughter, Sally Newcomb MacDonald, was born in June, 1944.

== Works ==
- McClendon, S; My Eight Presidents, Wyden Books, 1978. ISBN 0-88326-150-2.
- McClendon, S; Minton, J., Mr. President, Mr. President! — My Fifty Years of Covering the White House, General Pub. Group, 1996. ISBN 1-57544-005-9.
