= Yamboree =

Public fair

Coordinates: 32.7524°N 94.9374°W

The East Texas Yamboree, a four-day event held annually during the third weekend of October in Gilmer, Texas, celebrates the sweet potato (sometimes called a "yam" in the United States) as a former cash crop, drawing thousands of tourists to the city for the occasion each year. The event has been held in Gilmer since 1935. Festivities at the event include the Queen's Coronation Pageant, a carnival held around the town square, two parades--the first being the school parade with floats built by the different Upshur County Schools and different East Texas marching school bands. There is a marching contest for the high school bands on Friday. School floats are also judged, and the floats that earn first, second and third places are in the Queen's Parade, which takes place on Saturday. Other activities include a barn dance and livestock shows for the area FFA participants. Gilmer, Texas is the County seat of Upshur County and during this one week, the population of Gilmer grows in size from 5,000 to over 100,000 people. There have only been two times that they have not held the East Texas Yamboree and that was during wartime during World War II and recently when the COVID-19 pandemic started.

== History ==
To celebrate the Texas Centennial, counties around the state were tasked with having festivals. It was decided that Upshur County would celebrate the yam, once again thriving due to the recent lifting of a quarantine on the former cash crop. The quarantine had been put in place in the late 1920s, as the result of a weevil infestation. The festival proved to be so popular that the committee decided it would take place yearly from then on. It was temporarily suspended in 1941 due to World War II, and resumed in 1945; besides 2020 caused by the COVID-19 pandemic, resuming in 2021.

== Past Yam Queens and Presidents ==
Year	President	Queen
1935	R. C. Barnwell	Jane Tuttle
1936	J. R. Penn	Marjorie Coe
1937	W. C. Barnwell	Ruth Hogg
1938	V. E. Todd	Ernestine Dedman
1939	Fred Arnold	Bobby Jean Warren
1940	Fred Arnold	Clarine Smith
1941	Fred Arnold	Genice Graves
1942	Fred Arnold	Betty Ann Quiz
1946	John Brogoitti	Ann Wilkinson
1947	B. D. Futrell	Nell Brison
1948	Royce Hogg	Barbara King
1949	Ralph Michael	Angela Hogg
1950	Don Williams	Lena Margaret Harper
1951	Robert E. Parsons	Joyce Isbell
1952	Wessel Wilson	Linda Carroll
1953	Looney E. Lindsey	Diane Dupree
1954	F. L. Garrison	Carol Cox
1955	B. L Hogg	Mary Lou Ragland
1956	Bill Stevenson	Anna Beth Jones
1957	Mason Reardon	Sue Sorrells
1958	Leon Presnell	Mary Laschinger
1959	Melvin M. Cross	Ann Buie
1960	James Croley	Margaret Ingram
1961	Gordon Finney	Patricia Aldredge
1962	Richard Potter	Kay Floyd
1963	Tom Davis	Cathy Kurtz
1964	Harlan Thacker	Karen Clark
1965	C. E. Elwell	Linda Garrison
1966	Phil Wood	Donna Williams
1967	Harvey Arnold	Nancy Williams
1968	Dr. Bob Glaze	Mary Jo Proctor
1969	Kenneth White	Lana Sisson
1970	Dewitt Alexander	Laine Potter
1971	Fred Odom	Cindy Clark
1972	Steve Dean	Laura Potter
1973	Bill Beisch	Donna Stracener
1974	Frank Breazeale	Mary Jane Ford
1975	Byron Spencer	Stephanie Mayfield
1976	Bill Patterson	Phebe Phillips
1977	Don Smith	Ellizabeth Ann Patterson
1978	Robert Stracener	Susan Stracener
1979	Bill Taylor	Ann & Nan Poole
1980	Steve Williams	Pam Yocom
1981	Jack Baird	Kim Listenbee
1982	Larry Henson	Darrellene Wilson
1983	Cranfill Cox, Jr/Larry Henson	Peggy Lawler
1984	Dr. Andy Glaze	Teri Smith
1985	Paul David Williams	Fran Traywick
1986	Dr. Randy McDaniel	Victoria Mitchell
1987	Elliott Dean	Amy Dean
1988	Pete Herrmann	Kay White
1989	Tedd Austin	Jennifer Bishop
1990	George Dodd	Christi Seahorn
1991	Gary Patterson	Mary Jane Dean
1992	Dr Jerald Walton	Tracy Diane Williams
1993	Kelly Cox White	Anna McDaniel
1994	Steve Stewart	Sarah Lenora Dean
1995	David McQueen	Natalie Young
1996	A. L. Payne Lesley	Erin Glaze
1997	Randy Hill	Abigail Elaine Stewart
1998	Larry Cowan	Hayley Carol Smithhart
1999	Nat Harrison	Elizabeth Anne Daniels
2000	Dr. Dean Bums	Summer Layne Weisinger
2001	Joe Lynn Tillery	Adrienne Lee Lindsey
2002	W. Dennis Despain	Nancy Marie Warden
2003	F. Wayne Skinner	Courtney De-An Bums
2004	Brian Williams	Ann-Marie Despain
2005	Dr. David Buller	Katie Elizabeth Mannis
2006	Phil Fowler	Mary Carol Despain
2007	Jeff Dodd	Leslie Taylor McQueen
2008	Michael Leon Melton	Stephanie Lynn Henson
2009	Dr. Steve Murry	Lindsey Renee' Donaho
2010	Judge Dean Fowler	Kaitlyn Blair Tackett
2011	Randy Hill	Drew Danielle Henson-Hill
2012	Richard (Ricky) Holloway	Mary Paige Linder
2013	Ray Culberson	Karlie Carol White
2014	Randy Duke	Alexis Marie Williams
2015	Edward Williams	Jayce Savanna Finch-Henson
2016	Shayne Wilson	Riley Mackayla Meritt
2017	Brandon Garmon	Madison Lee Dean
2018	Troy Murray	Brinkley Grace Rash
2019	Michael Blanks	Audrey Scott Nolan
2020	Kyle Bowden	Carleigh Judd
2021	Rucker Joel Murry	Hannah Jean Henson
2022	Jordan Glaze	Caroline Michelle Dean
2023	Abigail Elaine Stewart	Addison Jayne Young
2024	Brett Williams	Katie Ella Henson

== See also ==
- List of festivals in the United States
- List of museums in East Texas
