= Charnwood Residential Historic District =

Historic district in Texas, United States

- U.S. National Register of Historic Places
- U.S. Historic district
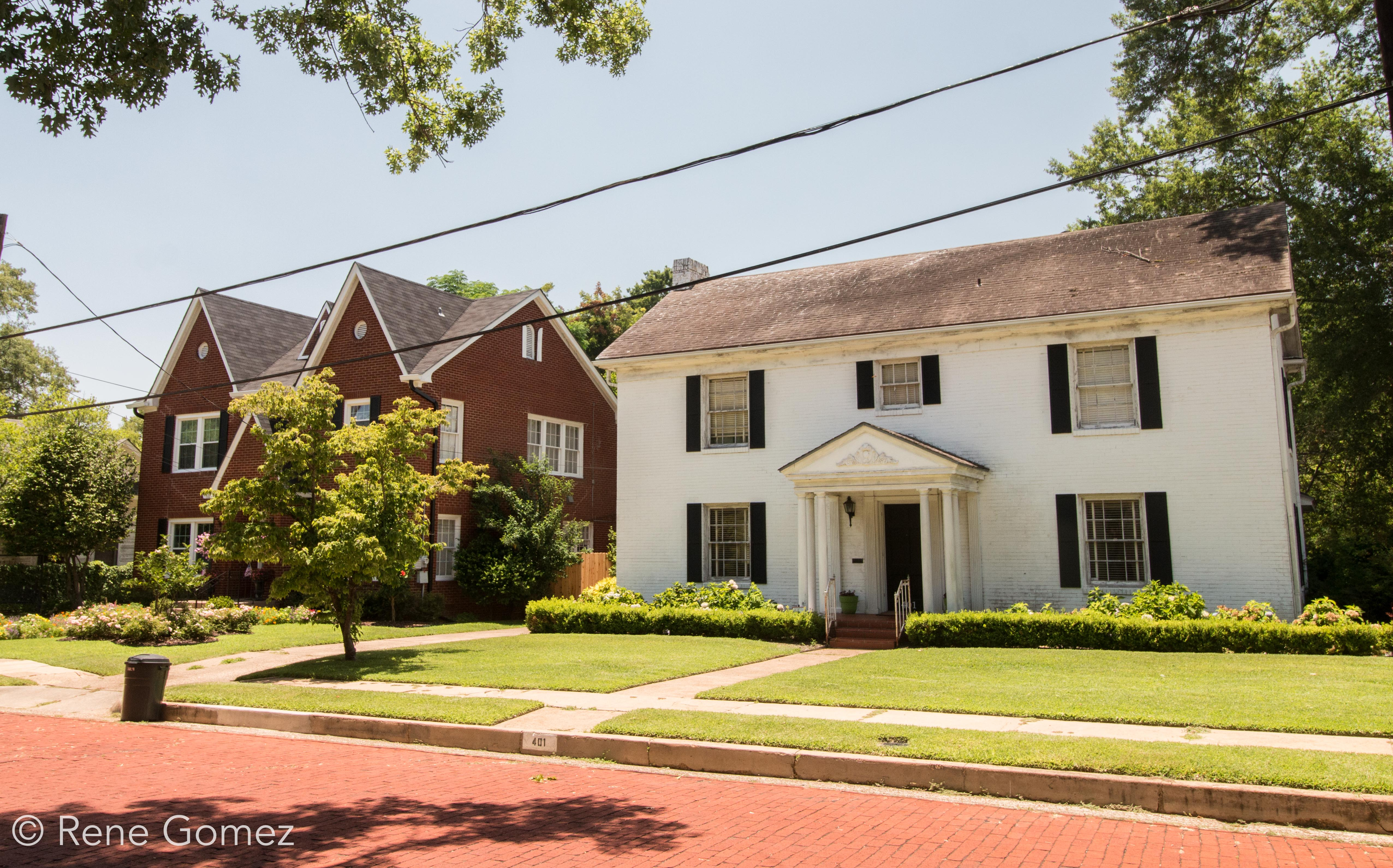
- Charnwood District in 2018

- Location within Texas Location within the United States
- Location: Roughly bounded by E Houston, RR tracks, E Wells, S Donnybrook, E Dobbs, and S Broadway, Tyler, Texas
- Coordinates: 32°20′28″N 95°17′50″W
- Area: 59.5 acres (24.1 ha)
- Built: 1870
- Architect: Barber & Kluttz; Hubbell & Greene, et al.
- Architectural style: Tudor Revival, Colonial Revival, et al.
- NRHP reference No.: 99001023
- Added to NRHP: August 20, 1999

The Charnwood Residential Historic District is a 59.5-acre (24.1 ha) historic district in Tyler, Texas that was listed on the National Register of Historic Places in 1999. It includes works dating from 1870. It includes works designed by Barber & Klutz, James Hubbell and Herbert M. Greene of the firm Hubbell & Greene, and other architects in Tudor Revival (38 homes), Colonial Revival (31 homes), and other styles.

The listed area covers about 15 blocks of Tyler. The NRHP listing included 166 contributing buildings and 42 contributing structures.

In 1999, the district was deemed to be:

worthy of preservation as the largest concentration of the widest range of mid-19th to mid-20 century resources in Tyler, developed through a complex network of family, business and neighbor relationships as well as by investor and speculator efforts. Representative of local community development patterns over a 110 year period, the district forms the core of a larger area, to the north, west and south that share similar patterns, but include less diverse resources dating from the 1880s to the early 1940s. As such the Chamwood Residential Historic District is a highly visual and important local landmark that documents the relationship between changing economics and development patterns and provides interpretation of social, and architectural trends in Tyler between c. 1870 and 1950 linking the city's heritage with the present.

Houses in the district include ones designed by Barber & Kluttz (although the NRHP register does not indicate which were its works), Hubbell & Greene, and other architects.

== Hand-Mayfield-Hunt House and Servants' Quarters ==
One of the contributing properties is the Hand-Mayfield-Hunt House and Servants' Quarters, at 223 East Charnwood. The house, probably built in 1861, is one of the oldest houses in the historic district. It was originally built as a private school plus a residence, in one frame building. In 1899 it was remodelled extensively into Classical Revival style, with a painted brick veneer, a two-story projecting portico supported by square columns, a balustrade, and a hipped roof. A portion of the structure was used by the 1853-founded Eastern Texas Female College, also known as Tyler Female Seminary, and later used by the Charnwood Institute. In 1999 the house was in operation as a bed and breakfast named Charnwood Hill Inn.

The property includes a servants' quarters duplex, built perhaps around 1875, which "probably housed domestic employees during the 19th and early 20th century. In 1932 Isabel Mayfield, a daughter of J. B. and Hattie Mayfield, occupied it. No occupants are shown in 1934-35, when it was likely used again as servants' quarters. This dwelling is the only surviving 19th century example of a servants' quarters in the district, and because of its duplex form is a locally rare type. It is significant for those reasons and for its place in providing auxiliary housing in the district to working class residents whose work and lives are somewhat invisible.

In 2021 the property was known as Hand-Mayfield-Hunt House and was the location of Historic Tyler Inc.'s annual Candlelight Party.

== See also ==
- National Register of Historic Places listings in Smith County, Texas
