= Jenkins-Harvey Super Service Station and Garage =

- Jenkins–Harvey Super Service Station and Garage
- U.S. National Register of Historic Places
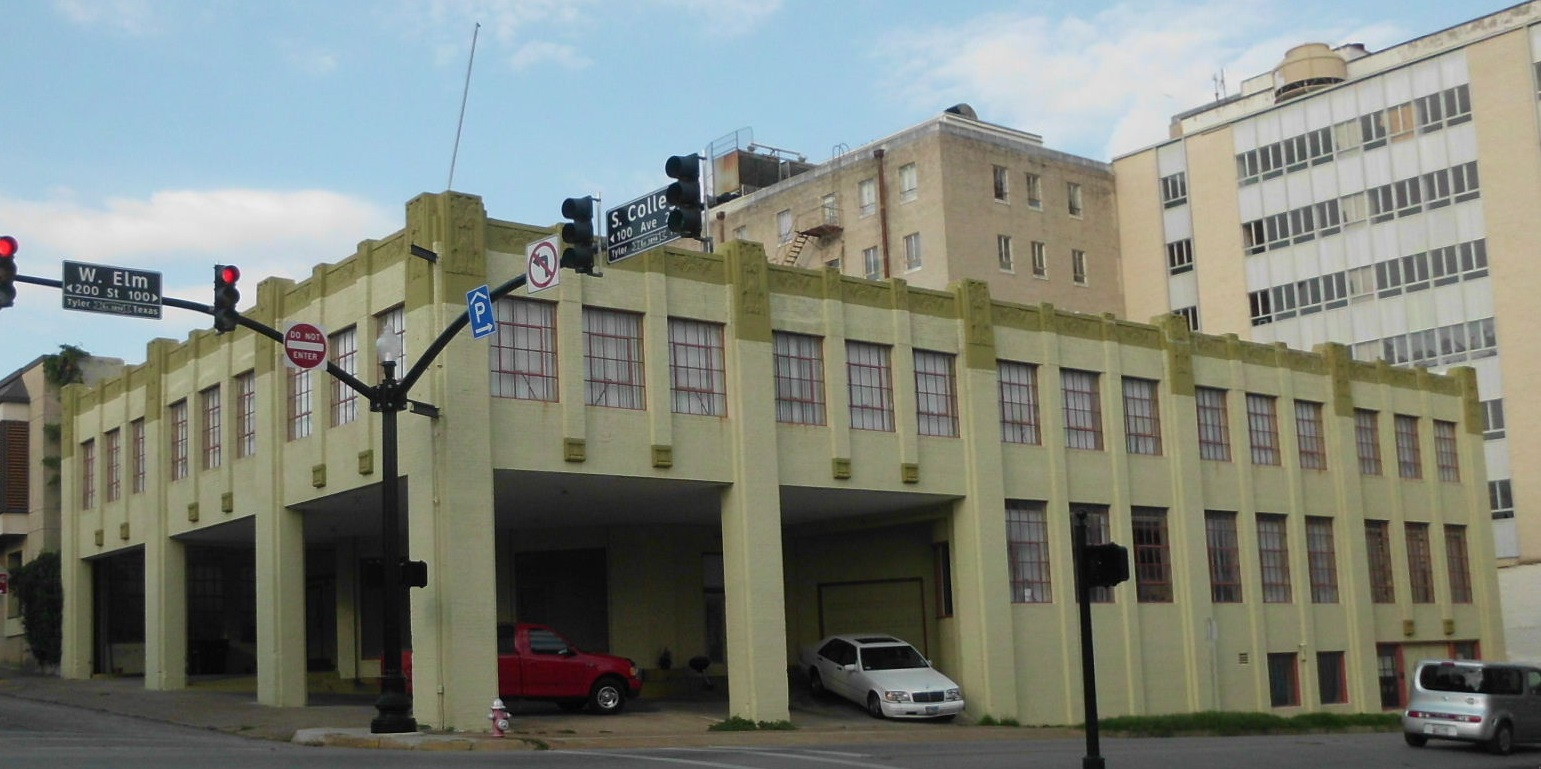
- Jenkins–Harvey building in 2014

- Location within Texas Location within the United States
- Location: 124 S. College, Tyler, Texas
- Coordinates: 32°20′59″N 95°18′4″W
- Area: 0.2 acres (0.081 ha)
- Built: 1929
- Built by: James P. Baugh
- Architectural style: Art Deco
- MPS: Tyler, Texas MPS
- NRHP reference No.: 02000646
- Added to NRHP: June 14, 2002

The Jenkins-Harvey Super Service Station and Garage, at 124 S. College in Tyler, Texas, was built in 1929. It was listed on the National Register of Historic Places in 2002.

It was designed by James P. Baugh in Art Deco style and is a landmark in Tyler.

== See also ==
- National Register of Historic Places listings in Smith County, Texas
