= Southwest Dairy Museum =

Dairy museum in Sulphur Springs, Texas

Coordinates: 33°8′27″N 95°37′14″W

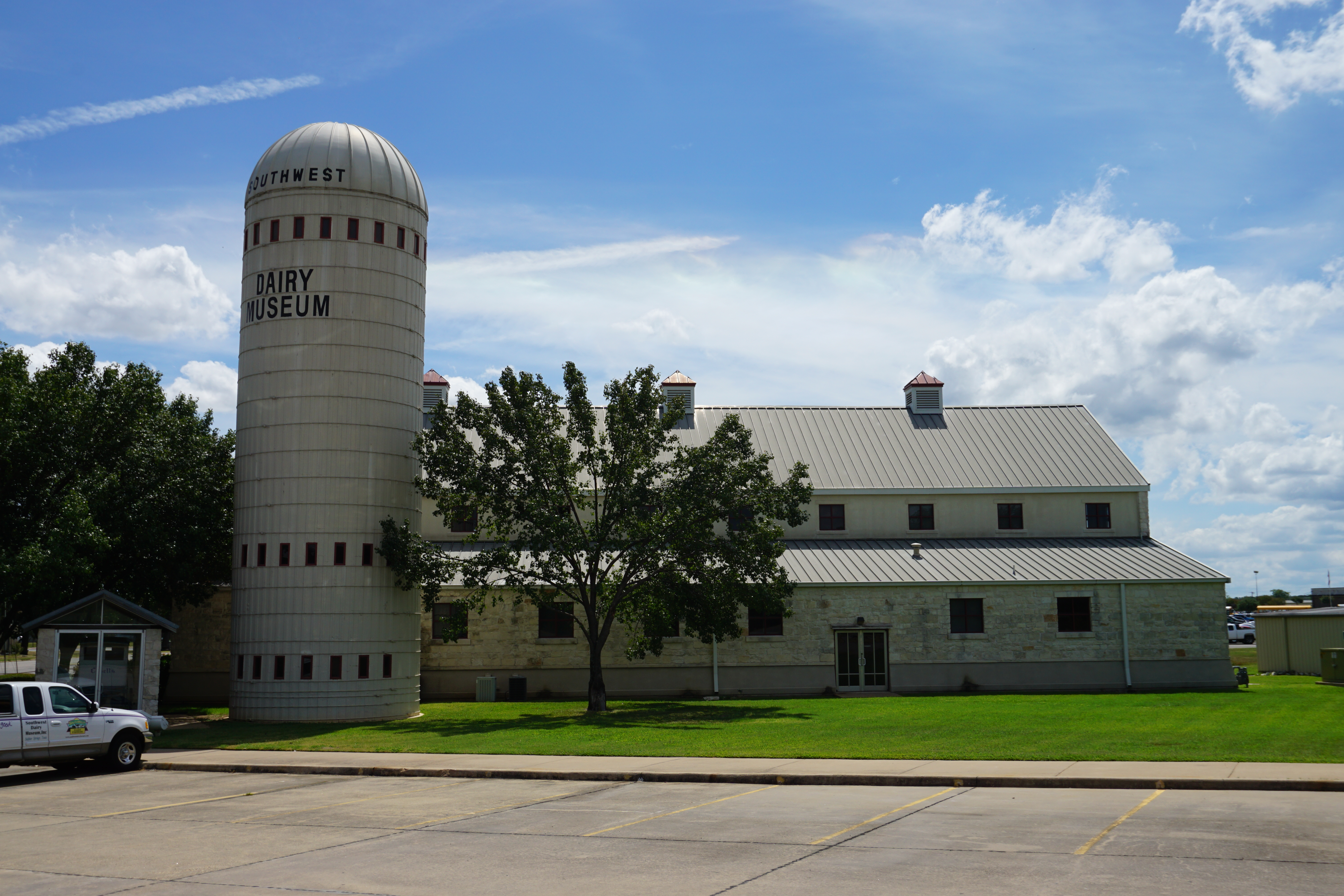
The exterior of the Southwest Dairy Museum

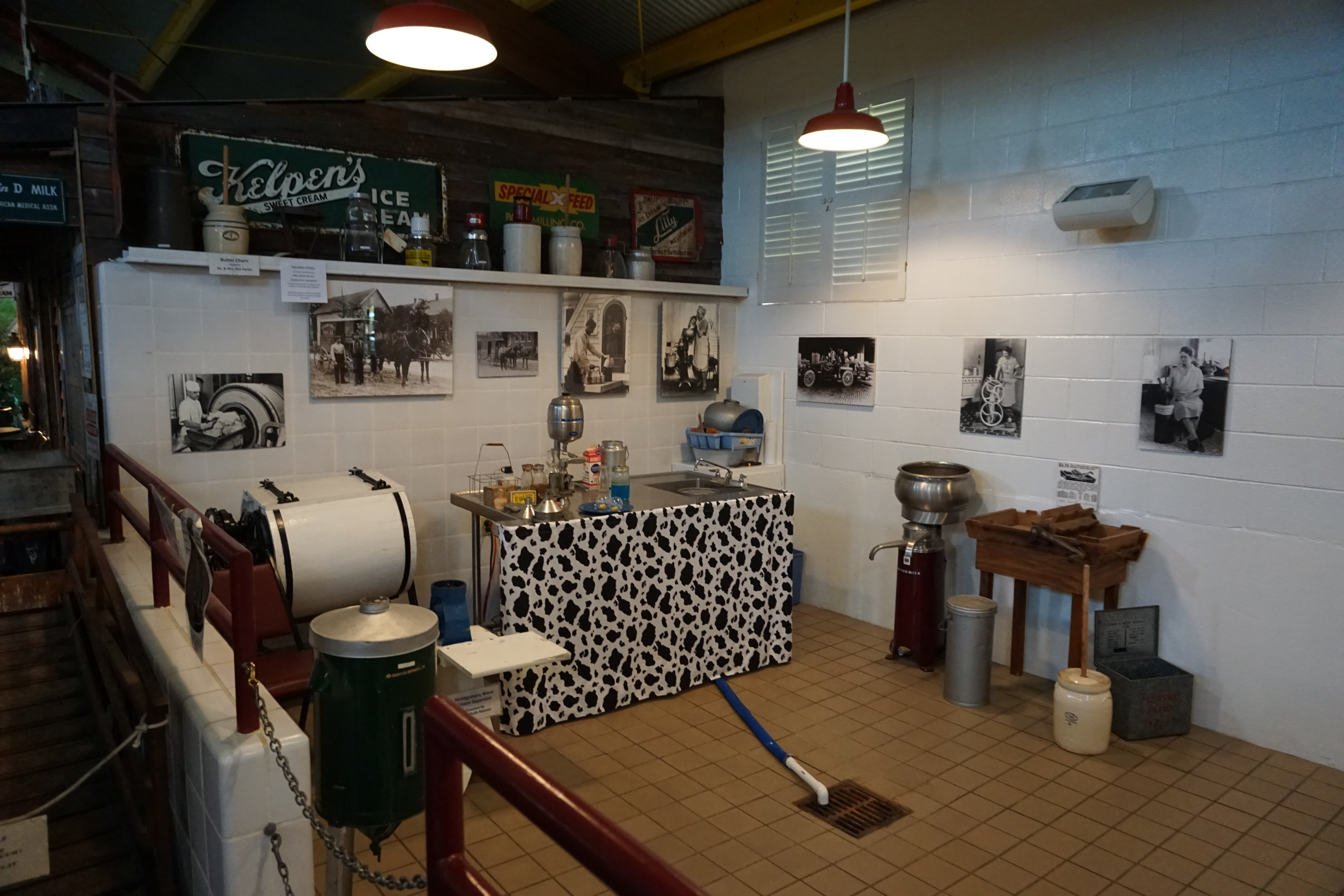
The interior of the Southwest Dairy Museum

The Southwest Dairy Museum, located in Sulphur Springs, Texas, showcases the importance of the dairy industry and its role in Hopkins County. The Southwest Dairy Museum is funded by the dairy checkoff program.

The idea for the museum came in 1982 when several in the dairy industry came up with the idea of preserving artifacts and historical documents related to the dairy industry in the United States, and specifically in rural areas. The museum followed in 1991.

The museum, which consists of a 10,000-square-foot (930 m^{2}) facility, serves as the headquarters for the many activities sponsored by the Southwest Dairy Farmers. The museum's exhibits include the life of a dairy farm before electricity came to rural areas and demonstrations on separating cream, the first step in dairy production. The museum's Mobile Dairy Classroom Program travels to schools, livestock shows, fairs and other special events to educate the public about dairy.

== See also ==
- List of museums in East Texas
