= Bascom N. Timmons =

American newspaperman (1890–1987)

Bascom Nolley Timmons
- Born: March 31, 1890; Amarillo, Texas, US
- Died: June 8, 1987 (aged 97); Washington, D.C., US
- Occupations: Journalist; Advisor to Calvin Coolidge and Franklin D. Roosevelt

Bascom Nolley Timmons (March 31, 1890 – June 8, 1987) was an American newspaperman based in Washington, D.C., in a career that spanned close to six decades. He was an advisor to U.S. Presidents Calvin Coolidge and Franklin D. Roosevelt, who had been competing opposite party candidates for Vice President of the United States in 1920.

Oddly, like the late Governor Claude R. Kirk Jr., of Florida, Timmons himself once sought to run for vice president, but the position is now selected by the presidential nominee of a political party. Timmons offered his candidacy in 1940, when his friend John Nance Garner declined to join President Roosevelt in seeking a third term as vice president. The nomination finally went to Henry A. Wallace of Iowa. In 1968, the Republican Kirk "ran" with the understanding that he would complement a ticket headed by either Richard M. Nixon or Nelson A. Rockefeller. Nixon, the successful nominee, however, tapped Governor Spiro T. Agnew of Maryland, for the second slot on the ticket.

A native of Amarillo, Texas, Timmons began his career in journalism at the age of sixteen with the former Fort Worth Record in Fort Worth, Texas. He later worked for the defunct Dallas Times-Herald, the Amarillo News, and the Milwaukee Sentinel. In 1912, he joined The Washington Post''. In 1920, Timmons created a bureau in the nation's capital, to serve newspapers in Texas, Oklahoma, Louisiana, Alabama, and Ohio. In 1932, Timmons became president of the National Press Club; in that capacity, he worked thereafter to save the press club building in New York City from foreclosure. He persuaded President Franklin Roosevelt to sign an amendment to the federal bankruptcy law that blocked the foreclosure and hence kept the building open. He was a member of the Sigma Delta Chi hall of fame.

In 1944, Timmons hired Sarah McClendon as the Washington correspondent for the Philadelphia Daily News. Two years later when Timmons dismissed McClendon to provide jobs for returning World War II veterans, she started her own McClendon News Service and remained a Washington institution for decades.

Timmons was widely respected and liked in Washington, D.C., but his reporting long infuriated Lyndon B. Johnson. Timmons' press bureau served a number of newspapers. His biggest customer, the Fort Worth Star-Telegram, listed him as its chief correspondent. Shortly after Johnson became President, he surreptitiously pressured the Amon G. Carter Jr., the Star-Telegram's owner, to drop Timmons. The paper gradually phased him out; Timmons seemed unaware of Johnson's role.

Timmons died at his home in Washington, D.C., of pneumonia at the age of ninety-seven.

== Books ==
- Garner of Texas : A Personal History (New York : Harper, 1948)
- Portrait of an American : Charles G. Dawes, a study of Vice President Charles G. Dawes of Illinois (New York : Holt, 1953)
- Jesse H. Jones : The Man and the Statesman, a study of United States Secretary of Commerce Jesse H. Jones of Texas (New York : Holt, 1956)
