= List of museums in East Texas =

This article was split from List of museums in Texas.

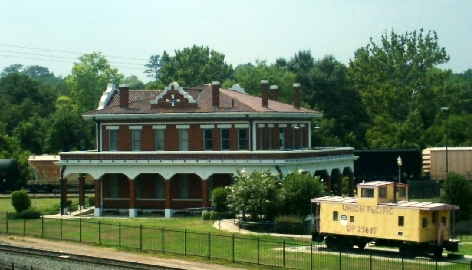
The Texas & Pacific Depot's Railway Museum

The list of museums in Texas encompasses museums defined for this context as institutions (including nonprofit organizations, government entities, and private businesses) that collect and care for objects of cultural, artistic, scientific, or historical interest and make their collections or related exhibits available for public viewing. Museums that exist only in cyberspace (i.e., virtual museums) are not included. Also included are non-profit art galleries and exhibit spaces.

== East Texas ==
East Texas is a region in the U.S. state of Texas, that borders the entire Louisiana state line on the east, Arkansas on the northeast near Texarkana, and Oklahoma on the north. It includes all or parts of 49 counties and contains the regions known as the Texas Piney Woods, and Deep East Texas.

Counties included are Anderson, Angelina, Bowie, Camp, Cass, Cherokee, Delta, Franklin, Gregg, Hardin, Harrison, Henderson, Hopkins, Houston, Jasper, Jefferson, Lamar, Marion, Morris, Nacogdoches, Newton, Orange, Panola, Polk, Rains, Red River, Rusk, Sabine, San Augustine, San Jacinto, Shelby, Smith, Titus, Trinity, Tyler, Upshur, Van Zandt, Walker and Wood.

== Museums ==
List of museums in East Texas
Museum name	Image	City	County	Notes	Refs
Howard House Museum	Howard House Museum	Palestine	Anderson		
Museum for East Texas Culture	Museum for East Texas Culture	Palestine	Anderson	Located in the old Palestine High School	
The History Center		Diboll	Angelina	Photographs, archives, oral history	
Museum of East Texas		Lufkin	Angelina		
Naranjo Museum of Natural History		Lufkin	Angelina	Dinosaurs and fossils, artifacts of ancient cultures	
Texas Forestry Museum	Texas Forestry Museum, Lufkin, TX IMG 8594	Lufkin	Angelina	Texas timber history	
Ace of Clubs House	Draughn-Moore House, Texarkana	Texarkana	Bowie	AJA the Draughn-Moore House on the National Register of Historic Places	
Discovery Place Children's Museum		Texarkana	Bowie		
Texarkana Museum of Regional History		Texarkana	Bowie	Recorded Texas Historic Landmark, National Register of Historic Places	
Regional Arts Center		Texarkana	Bowie	Recorded Texas Historic Landmark, National Register of Historic Places	
The Williams House Museum		De Kalb	Bowie	1885 Texas & Pacific Railroad Section House. Exhibits on Lead Belly, Luke Walker, Durwood Merrill, Barry B. Telford, Dan Blocker and Ricky Nelson	
Northeast Texas Rural Heritage Museum	Northeast Texas Rural Heritage Center and Museum	Pittsburg	Camp		
Atlanta Historical Museum		Atlanta	Cass	Exhibit on locally born aviator Bessie Coleman	
American Freedom Museum		Bullard	Cherokee	WWII memorabilia	
Caddo Mounds State Historic Site	Caddo Mound Texas State Historic Site	Alto	Cherokee	National Register of Historic Places	
Heritage Center of Cherokee County		Rusk	Cherokee	Artifacts dating from American Civil War to current day	
Jim Hogg Historic Site		Rusk	Cherokee		
Vanishing Texana Museum	Jacksonville Senior Center and Vanishing Texana Museum	Jacksonville	Cherokee	Collections date to the 1800s through the 1970s.	
Patterson Museum		Enloe	Delta County		
Clara Foster Slough Museum		Enloe	Delta County	Artifacts, genealogy center	
Alamo Mission Museum		Mount Vernon	Franklin	Replica of the Alamo Mission	
Cotton Belt Depot	Cotton Belt Depot	Mount Vernon	Franklin		
Fire Station Museum	Fire Station Museum	Mount Vernon	Franklin	Memorabilia related to hometown football athlete Don Meredith	
Franklin County Genealogical Society		Mount Vernon	Franklin		
Majors-Parchman Farmstead		Mount Vernon	Franklin	1883 Victorian farmhouse	
Old Jail Art Museum	Old Jail Art Museum	Mount Vernon	Franklin	Housed in a circa 1912 jail	
Winnsboro Historical Museum		Winnsboro	Franklin		
Kilgore College East Texas Oil Museum	East Texas Oil Museum building, Kilgore, TX IMG 5900	Kilgore	Gregg	History, artifacts and exhibits	
Gladewater Museum		Gladewater	Gregg	The museum displays tell the story of Gladewater and the surrounding areas from the early settlement days through the 1930s and beyond. Elvis performed here many times	
Gregg County Historical Museum	Everett Building 2	Longview	Gregg	Housed in the 1910 Everett Building	
Longview Museum of Fine Arts	Longview Museum of Fine Arts	Longview	Gregg	Focus is contemporary regional art	
R.G. LeTourneau Memorial Museum and Archives		Longview	Gregg		
Rangerette Showcase and Museum	Texas Rangerette Museum, Kilgore, TX IMG 5907	Kilgore	Gregg	Part of Kilgore College, memorabilia of the Kilgore College Rangerettes	
Batson Oil Patch Museum		Batson	Hardin	A tribute to the unsung working-class heroes of the oil industry	
Bertha Terry Cornwell Museum of Sour Lake History		Sour Lake	Hardin	Sour Lake history 1840 to present	
Kirby-Hill House	Kirby hill house kountze Texas 2014	Kountze	Hardin	National Register of Historic Places	
Ice House Museum		Silsbee	Hardin	Recorded Texas Historic Landmark	
Harrison County Historical Museum	Confederate marker in Marshall, TX IMG 2332	Marshall	Harrison	Located in the old courthouse, county history and culture	
Inez Hatley Hughes Historical Research Center		Marshall	Harrison		
Marshall Visual Art Center		Marshall	Harrison		
Michelson Museum of Art	Michelson Museum of Art, Marshall, Texas	Marshall	Harrison	Work of Russian-American artist Leo Michelson	
Service and Sacrifice: Harrison County at War at Memorial City Hall Performance Center		Marshall	Harrison		
Starr Family Home State Historic Site	Starr Home at Christmas, Marshall, TX IMG 2350	Marshall	Harrison	Recorded Texas Historic Landmark, National Register of Historic Places	
T. C. Lindsey and Co. General Store		Jonesville	Harrison	Old-fashioned general store and part museum with antiques, rare automobiles, jukeboxes and other memorabilia	
Texas and Pacific Railway Museum	Texas and Pacific Railway Museum	Marshall	Harrison	Railroad related	
Chandler Museum & Visitors Center		Chandler	Henderson		
East Texas Arboretum and Botanical Society		Athens	Henderson		
Henderson County Historical Museum		Athens	Henderson	Local history	
Old Henderson County Jail		Athens	Henderson	Recorded Texas Historic Landmark	
Texas Freshwater Fisheries Center		Athens	Henderson	26,000-gallon aquarium, live shows	
Hopkins County Museum and Heritage Park	Hopkins County Museum and Heritage Park	Sulphur Springs	Hopkins	Includes local history museum and park with over 11 relocated historic houses, shops and mills	
Southwest Dairy Museum		Sulphur Springs	Hopkins	Dairy farming and dairy products	
Houston County Visitor Center And Museum		Crockett	Houston	Varied collection	
Monroe-Crook House		Crockett	Houston	Texas Historic Landmark, National Register of Historic Places. Built in 1854 by Armistead Thompson Mason Monroe, grandnephew of President James Monroe	
Calaboose Museum		Kirbyville	Jasper	Images and artifacts	
East Texas Regional Art Center		Jasper	Jasper	6-8 exhibitions per year	
Jasper County Historical Museum		Jasper	Jasper	Weaponry collection dating back to the Texas Revolution	
Art Museum of Southeast Texas		Beaumont	Jefferson	Art collection that spans three centuries	
Babe Didrikson Zaharias Museum	Babe Zaharis Museum IMG 1061	Beaumont	Jefferson	Babe Didrikson Zaharia was born in Port Arthur	
Beaumont Art League		Beaumont	Jefferson	Brown Gallery and the Scurlock Gallery	
Beaumont Children's Museum	Beaumont February 16 023	Beaumont	Jefferson	Inside the Beaumont Civic Center	
Beaumont Police Department Museum		Beaumont	Jefferson	Weaponry and memorabilia	
Chambers Historical House Museum	Chambers Historical House Museum	Beaumont	Jefferson	Historic house	
Clifton Steamboat Museum		Beaumont	Jefferson		
Dishman Art Museum	Dishman Art Museum	Beaumont	Jefferson	Part of Lamar University	
Dutch Windmill Museum		Nederland	Jefferson	Multiple exhibits about area cultural history	
Edison Museum	Edison museum beaumont tx 2014	Beaumont	Jefferson	All about Thomas Edison and his inventions	
Fire Museum of Texas	Fire Museum of Texas in Beaumont	Beaumont	Jefferson	Recorded Texas Historic Landmark	
John Jay French House	2014-10-11 Beaumont, Tx., French Trading, Historic homes 014	Beaumont	Jefferson	Oldest house in Beaumont, built in 1845	
La Maison Acadienne		Nederland	Jefferson	Replica of early Acadian homes in South Louisiana, with local French heritage displays	
La Maison Beausoleil		Port Neches	Jefferson	Built 1810 in Vermilion Parish, Louisiana	
McFaddin-Ward House	McFaddin-Ward House	Beaumont	Jefferson	Listed on the National Register of Historical Places	
Museum of the Gulf Coast		Port Arthur	Jefferson	Heritage of the Gulf Coast	
Pompeiian Villa	Pompeiian Villa by Michael Reed fastturtles.org	Port Arthur	Jefferson	Replica of a 79 A.D Pompeiian villa . National Register of Historic Places and is a Recorded Texas historic Landmark	
Rose Hill Manor	Rose hill by Michael Reed fastturtles.org	Port Arthur	Jefferson	Listed on the National Register of Historical Places	
Spindletop-Gladys City Boomtown Museum	The Spindletop-Gladys City Boomtown Museum	Beaumont	Jefferson	Part of Lamar University, restored oil boomtown village that show the effects of the Spindletop oil well on the local community	
Texas Artist Museum		Port Arthur	Jefferson	Working museum for area artists	
Texas Energy Museum		Beaumont	Jefferson	Texas oil industry and oil discovery science	
White Haven		Port Arthur	Jefferson	1905 New England colonial style home, but later changed to Southern Greek Revival. Owned by Lamar State College-Port Arthur. Tours by appointment only	
Vuylsteke Dutch Home		Port Arthur	Jefferson	Early 20th-century (1905) Dutch colonial home owned by Lamar State College–Port Arthur.	
Lamar County Historical Museum	Lamar County Historical Museum	Paris	Lamar		
Sam Bell Maxey House State Historic Site	Sam Bell Maxey House	Paris	Lamar	Recorded Texas Historic Landmark, National Register of Historic Places	
Valley of the Caddo Museum and Cultural Center		Paris	Lamar		
Jefferson Historical Society Museum		Jefferson	Marion	Recorded Texas Historic Landmark, National Register of Historic Places	
Lafayette Street Vintage Vehicles Car Museum		Jefferson	Marion	Vintage and antique cars from the 1920s through the 1950s	
Epperson-McNutt House	House of the Seasons, Jefferson, Texas	Jefferson	Marion	aka House of the Seasons, listed on NRHP in Marion County, 1870s period Greek Revival house	
Museum of Measurement and Time		Jefferson	Marion	Horology Measurement Mathematics, from the collection of Johnny and Edith Ingram	
R. D. Moses Texas & Pacific Model Railroad		Jefferson	Marion	Located in the depot building behind the Jefferson Museum, 1950s period HO model train layout of the Texas & Pacific Railroad in West Texas. Model railroad by R.D. Moses and Jack Luck over three decades	
Durst-Taylor Historic House and Gardens	DurstTaylor1	Nacogdoches	Nacogdoches	Mid-19th-century period house	
Millard's Crossing Historic Village		Nacogdoches	Nacogdoches	Recorded Texas Historic Landmark. 19th and early 20th-century village on 37 acres	
Nacogdoches Fire Department Museum		Nacogdoches	Nacogdoches	Built in 1996	
Nacogdoches Railroad Depot Museum		Nacogdoches	Nacogdoches	Railroad	
Old Stone Fort Museum	Old Stone Fort in Nacogdoches, Texas	Nacogdoches	Nacogdoches	Part of Stephen F. Austin State University, located in a replica late 18th-century building that was a trading post, private home, church, jail and saloon	
Old University Building		Nacogdoches	Nacogdoches	Recorded Texas Historic Landmark, National Register of Historic Places	
Sterne-Hoya House Museum and Library	Sterne-Hoya House Museum and Library, Nacogdoches, TX IMG 3998	Nacogdoches	Nacogdoches	Recorded Texas Historic Landmark, National Register of Historic Places, mid 19th-century house associated with Davy Crockett and Sam Houston	
Stephen F. Austin State University Galleries		Nacogdoches	Nacogdoches	Multiple on campus galleries	
Newton County Historical Center and Museum		Newton	Newton	Local archives, archaeology, history and artifacts	
Powell Hotel Museum		Newton	Newton	Built in 1889 as the W.H.Ford Male and Female College. Converted in 1914 to a hotel, serving as a private residence 40 years later	
Orangefield Cormier Museum		Orange	Orange	Conceived by oilman Paul Cormier to depict life in a small town	
Bridge City Historical Museum		Bridge City	Orange		
Heritage House Museum		Orange	Orange	Recorded Texas Historic Landmark, National Register of Historic Places	
Stark Museum of Art		Orange	Orange	American Western and Native American art and artifacts	
W. H. Stark House	StarkHouse	Orange	Orange	National Register of Historic Places 1920s period house	
Panola County Heritage Museum and Texas Tea Room	Panola County Heritage Museum, Carthage, Texas	Carthage	Panola		
Panola County Jail	Panola County Jail	Carthage	Panola	Historic county jail, includes the Old Jail Museum on the 2nd floor, and the Soape Family Museum with displays of local history	
Texas Country Music Hall of Fame	Texas Country Music Hall of Fame and Tex Ritter Museum, Carthage, Texas	Carthage	Panola	Texas country music singers, songwriters, disc jockeys, etc.	
Johnson's Rock Shop and Museum		Livingston	Polk	Rocks, crystals and fossils	
Polk County Memorial Museum		Livingston	Polk	Exhibits include prehistory, Native Americans, pioneers, industry, agriculture, businesses, culture	
Emory Heritage Park		Emory	Rains County		
Lennox Home		Clarksville	Red River	Operated by the Red River County Historical Society. Queen Anne-style 1897 home	
Red River County Old Jail Museum	Red River County Old Jail Museum	Clarksville	Red River	Completed in 1889, architects Maj. S. B. Haggart and Marshall Sanguinet	
Depot Museum	Depot Museum, Henderson, Texas	Henderson	Rusk	Recorded Texas Historic Landmark, aka Rusk County Depot Museum Complex	
Gaston Museum		Joinerville	Rusk	Life in the East Texas Oil Field from the 1930s through 1960s	
Howard Dickinson House		Henderson	Rusk	Historic house built in 1855 by Virginia-born brothers James and David P. Howard. David's wife Martha Ann was a cousin to Sam Houston, who made numerous visits to the home.	
London Museum	London Museum, New London, Texas	New London	Rusk	History and artifacts of the 1937 New London School explosion, which killed approximately 298 people	
Monte Verdi Plantation		Cushing	Rusk	National Register of historic places. Former cotton plantation that used enslaved labor until the June 19, 1865 emancipation of the slaves in Texas	
Patricia Huffman Smith NASA Museum - Remembering Columbia		Hemphill	Sabine	The museum was funded by real estate developer Al Smith and named for his wife Patricia Huffman Smith. Crew of the 2003 Space Shuttle Columbia disaster: Americans commander Rick Husband, pilot William C. McCool, mission specialists Michael P. Anderson, David M. Brown, Kalpana Chawla, Laurel Clark; and payload specialist Ilan Ramon of Israel. During the recovery of the bodies, helicopter pilot Jules “Buzz” Mier Jr. and Texas Forest Service employee Charles Kreneck also lost their lives	
Sabine County Jail Museum and Vergie Speights Memorial Library		Hemphill	Sabine		
Ezekiel Cullen House	Ezekiel Cullen House, San Augustine, Texas	San Augustine	San Augustine	Mid 19th-century house, operated by the Daughters of the Republic of Texas	
Mission Dolores State Historic Site		San Augustine	San Augustine	Visitor center, museum and campground with artifacts from the Mission Nuestra Senora de los Dolores de los Ais, one of the Spanish missions in Texas	
San Jacinto County Museum and Old Jail	San Jacinto County Jail, Coldspring, Texas	Coldspring	San Jacinto	Recorded Texas Historic Landmark, National Register of Historic Places	
Camp Ford Historic Park, C.S.A.		Tyler	Smith		
Carnegie History Center		Tyler	Smith		
Center for Earth and Space Science Education		Tyler	Smith	On the campus of Tyler Junior College	
Cotton Belt Depot Museum	Cotton Belt Depot Museum	Tyler	Smith	Deeded to the city of Tyler by the Southern Pacific Rail Road	
Dewberry Plantation	Historic American Buildings Survey, Harry L. Starnes, Photographer December 23, 1936, FRONT AND SIDE ELEVATION. – Colonel John Dewberry Plantation House, Farm Road 346, Bullard, HABS TEX,212- ,2-1	Tyler	Smith	The life of Col. John Dewberry	
Discovery Science Place	Rear view of DSP Ship in Discovery Landing	Tyler	Smith	For kids of all ages	
Goodman–LeGrand House	Goodman–LeGrand House	Tyler	Smith	National Register of Historic Places	
Historic Aviation Memorial Museum		Tyler	Smith	Oral histories, memorabilia and aircraft	
Tyler Museum of Art		Tyler	Smith	Over a thousand works of art	
Tyler Rose Museum		Tyler	Smith	History and memorabilia of the Texas Rose Festival	
Whitaker-McClendon House	WhitakerMcClendonHouse1	Tyler	Smith	National Register of Historic Places. Eastlake Bracketed Victorian period estate	
Trinity County Museum and Hensley Genealogical and Historical Research Center	Trinity County Museum and Hensley Genealogical and Historical Research Center	Groveton	Trinity		
Allan Shivers Library and Museum		Woodville	Tyler	Established by former Texas governor Allan Shivers in 1996 and his wife Marialice. Housed in the 1881 old Robert A. Cruse home	
Colmesneil House		Colmesneil	Tyler	Built in 1880 by W.T. Colmesneil	
Heritage Village		Woodville	Tyler	Replicated pioneer structures	
Flight of the Phoenix Aviation Museum		Gilmer	Upshur		
Historic Upshur Museum		Gilmer	Upshur	Recorded Texas Historic Landmark	
Literary Museum in Gilmer		Gilmer	Upshur	Global memorabilia from the Larry W. Osborne collection	
Blackwell House Museum	Blackwell House Museum, Canton, TX IMG 5614	Canton	Van Zandt County	Built in 1886	
Canton Plaza Museum		Canton	Van Zandt County		
The Salt Palace	The Salt Palace, Grand Saline, Texas	Grand Saline	Van Zandt County	Constructed entirely of salt, as the entire town is built atop an underground salt lode.	
Heritage Park Museum of East Texas		Edgewood	Van Zandt County	Recorded Texas Historic Landmark	
Van Area Oil & Historical Museum		Van	Van Zandt County		
Van Zandt County Veterans Memorial and Visitors Center		Canton	Van Zandt County		
Wills Point Depot Museum		Wills Point	Van Zandt County	Artifacts, documents and photos	
Gibbs-Powell House Museum		Huntsville	Walker	Recorded Texas Historic Landmark	
H.E.A.R.T.S. Veterans Museum of Texas		Huntsville	Walker		
Sam Houston Memorial Museum	Sam Houston Memorial Museum, Huntsville, Texas	Huntsville	Walker	Recorded Texas Historic Landmark, National Register of Historic Place	
Samuel Walker Houston Museum and Cultural Center		Huntsville	Walker	Both Samuel Walker Houston and his father Joshua Houston were enslaved people owned by Sam Houston	
Texas Prison Museum	Texas Prison Museum	Huntsville	Walker	The museum has on display the Old Sparky electric chair used for executions	
Alba Public Library and Museum		Alba	Wood		
East Texas African American Museum		Hawkins	Wood	Founded in 2016, spearheaded by Gloria Washington, Clarence Shackleford and Tyler pastor Steven Cofe	
Mineola Historical Museum		Mineola	Wood	National Register of Historic Places	
Mineola Railroad Museum		Mineola	Wood	See: Mineola station (Texas)	

== Defunct museums ==
- Light Crust Doughboys Hall of Fame and Museum, Quitman, all things related to the Light Crust Doughboys, opened 2005, closed 2011

== See also ==
- List of museums in Texas
- List of museums in Central Texas
- List of museums in the Texas Gulf Coast
- List of museums in North Texas
- List of museums in the Texas Panhandle
- List of museums in South Texas
- List of museums in West Texas

== Resources ==
- Texas Association of Museums
- Historic House Museums in Texas
