= St. James Colored Methodist Episcopal Church =

Historic church in Texas, United States

- St. James Christian Methodist Episcopal Church
- U.S. National Register of Historic Places
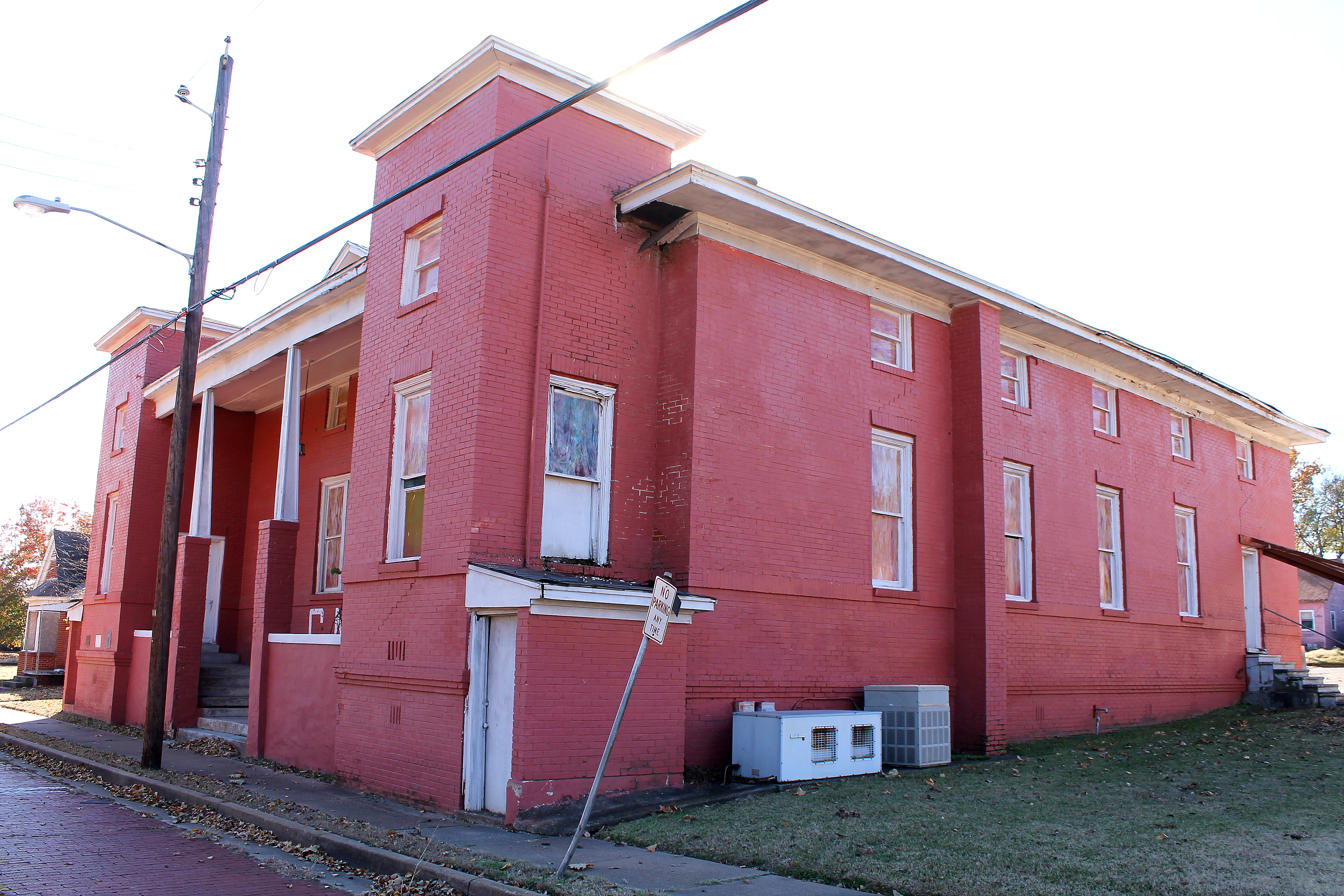
- St. James Church in 2014

- Location within Texas Location within the United States
- Location: 408 N. Border Ave., Tyler, Texas
- Coordinates: 32°21′21″N 95°18′24″W
- Area: 2 acres (0.81 ha)
- Built: 1920
- Architect: Jonas Levias Jewett
- Architectural style: Classical Revival
- MPS: Tyler, Texas MPS
- NRHP reference No.: 04000887
- Added to NRHP: August 20, 2004

St. James Christian Methodist Episcopal Church (St. James C.M.E. Church; St. James Christian Methodist Episcopal Church) is a historic church at 408 N. Border Avenue in Tyler, Texas, United States. It was built in 1920 and added to the National Register of Historic Places in 2004.

== See also ==
- National Register of Historic Places listings in Smith County, Texas
