= National Register of Historic Places listings in Smith County, Texas =

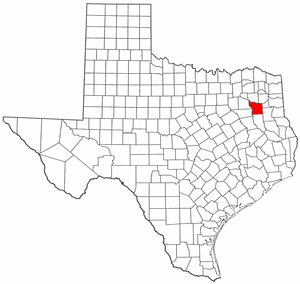
Location of Smith County in Texas

This is a list of the National Register of Historic Places listings in Smith County, Texas.

This is intended to be a complete list of properties and districts listed on the National Register of Historic Places in Smith County, Texas. There are eight districts and 29 individual properties listed on the National Register in the county. Three individually listed properties are State Antiquities Landmarks two of which, along with six others, are Recorded Texas Historic Landmarks. Three districts contain additional Recorded Texas Historic Landmarks.

This National Park Service list is complete through NPS recent listings posted February 20, 2026.

== Current listings ==
The locations of National Register properties and districts may be seen in a mapping service provided.

	Name on the Register	Image	Date listed	Location	City or town	Description
1	Azalea Residential Historic District	Azalea Residential Historic District	June 23, 2003 (#03000559)	Roughly bounded by S. Robertson Av., Sunnybrook Dr., Fair Ln., Old Bullard Rd., College Av., W. 4th St., Highland Av.. 32°19′40″N 95°18′06″W	Tyler	Includes Recorded Texas Historic Landmark; Historic and Architectural Resources of Tyler MPS
2	Blackstone Building	Blackstone Building	June 14, 2002 (#02000645)	315 N. Broadway; 32°21′12″N 95°18′02″W	Tyler	Historic and Architectural Resources of Tyler MPS
3	Brick Streets Neighborhood Historic District	Brick Streets Neighborhood Historic District	April 28, 2004 (#04000379)	Roughly bounded by South Broadway, W. Dobbs St., S. Kennedy Ave., S. Vine Ave., Interior Property Lines, S. College Ave. 32°20′33″N 95°18′16″W	Tyler	Includes Recorded Texas Historic Landmarks; Historic and Architectural Resources of Tyler MPS
4	Campbell Building-Union Bus Station	Campbell Building-Union Bus Station	January 19, 2023 (#100008548)	311 North Bois d' Arc Ave. 32°21′05″N 95°18′10″W	Tyler	
5	Carnegie Public Library	Carnegie Public Library	March 26, 1979 (#79003007)	125 S. College St. 32°21′00″N 95°18′07″W	Tyler	State Antiquities Landmark, Recorded Texas Historic Landmark
6	Charnwood Residential Historic District	Charnwood Residential Historic District	August 20, 1999 (#99001023)	Roughly bounded by E Houston, RR tracks, E Wells, S Donnybrook, E Dobbs, and S Broadway; 32°20′28″N 95°17′50″W	Tyler	Includes Recorded Texas Historic Landmark
7	Cotton Belt Building	Cotton Belt Building	December 6, 2005 (#05001405)	1517 W. Front St. 32°20′49″N 95°19′03″W	Tyler	
8	Crescent Laundry	Crescent Laundry	June 14, 2002 (#02000644)	312-320 E. Ferguson St. 32°21′07″N 95°17′51″W	Tyler	Historic and Architectural Resources of Tyler MPS
9	Col. John Dewberry House	Col. John Dewberry House	May 6, 1971 (#71000963)	1 mi (1.6 km). N of Teaselville on FM 346; 32°09′32″N 95°24′17″W	Teaselville	Recorded Texas Historic Landmark
10	Donnybrook Duplex Residential Historic District	Donnybrook Duplex Residential Historic District	June 14, 2002 (#02000649)	Roughly bounded by E. 6th St., Donnybrook Ave., E. 8th St., and S. Wall; 32°19′42″N 95°17′48″W	Tyler	Historic and Architectural Resources of Tyler MPS
11	John B. and Ketura (Kettie) Douglas House	John B. and Ketura (Kettie) Douglas House	January 9, 1997 (#96001565)	318 S. Fannin Ave. 32°20′51″N 95°17′54″W	Tyler	Recorded Texas Historic Landmark
12	East Ferguson Residential Historic District	East Ferguson Residential Historic District	June 14, 2002 (#02000647)	423-513 E. Ferguson St. 32°21′04″N 95°17′45″W	Tyler	Historic and Architectural Resources of Tyler MPS
13	Elks Club Building	Elks Club Building	June 14, 2002 (#02000648)	202 S. Broadway; 32°20′58″N 95°18′01″W	Tyler	Historic and Architectural Resources of Tyler MPS
14	D.R. Glass Library at Texas College	D.R. Glass Library at Texas College	March 7, 2007 (#07000128)	2404 N. Grand Ave. 32°22′25″N 95°18′44″W	Tyler	
15	Goodman-LeGrand House	Goodman-LeGrand House	November 7, 1976 (#76002066)	624 N. Broadway; 32°21′24″N 95°18′05″W	Tyler	State Antiquities Landmark, Recorded Texas Historic Landmark
16	Jenkins-Harvey Super Service Station and Garage	Jenkins-Harvey Super Service Station and Garage	June 14, 2002 (#02000646)	124 S. College; 32°20′59″N 95°18′06″W	Tyler	Historic and Architectural Resources of Tyler MPS
17	Martin Hall at Texas College		December 6, 2005 (#05001404)	2404 N. Grand Ave. 32°22′33″N 95°18′42″W	Tyler	
18	Marvin Methodist Episcopal Church, South	Marvin Methodist Episcopal Church, South	November 15, 2000 (#00001385)	300 W. Erwin St. 32°21′01″N 95°18′11″W	Tyler	Recorded Texas Historic Landmark
19	Mayfair Building		October 18, 2024 (#100010937)	411 Fair Park Drive, Building B 32°20′45″N 95°19′27″W	Tyler	
20	Moore Grocery Co. Building	Moore Grocery Co. Building	September 13, 2002 (#02000991)	408 N. Broadway; 32°21′14″N 95°18′03″W	Tyler	Historic and Architectural Resources of Tyler MPS
21	People's National Bank Building	People's National Bank Building	August 22, 2002 (#02000896)	102 N. College Ave. 32°21′03″N 95°18′06″W	Tyler	Historic and Architectural Resources of Tyler MPS
22	Pollard Residential Historic District		January 29, 2026 (#100012639)	Roughly bounded by Troup Highway to the north and northeast; Paluxy Drive to the east; East Southeast Loop 323 to the south; and New Copeland Road to the west 32°18′49″N 95°17′10″W	Tyler	
23	President's House at Texas College		March 7, 2007 (#07000131)	2404 N. Grand Ave. 32°22′27″N 95°18′40″W	Tyler	
24	Ramey House	Ramey House	October 29, 1982 (#82001738)	605 S. Broadway; 32°20′37″N 95°18′04″W	Tyler	Recorded Texas Historic Landmark; part of Brick Streets Neighborhood Historic District
25	Short-Line Residential Historic District	Short-Line Residential Historic District	August 22, 2002 (#02000897)	Roughly bounded by West Ln., N. Ellis, Short St., and an unnamed alley to the east 32°21′14″N 95°18′26″W	Tyler	Historic and Architectural Resources of Tyler MPS
26	Smith County Jail, 1881	Smith County Jail, 1881	August 22, 1996 (#96000937)	309 Erwin St. 32°21′02″N 95°17′53″W	Tyler	Recorded Texas Historic Landmark
27	St. James Colored Methodist Episcopal Church	St. James Colored Methodist Episcopal Church	August 20, 2004 (#04000887)	408 N. Border Ave. 32°21′15″N 95°18′23″W	Tyler	Historic and Architectural Resources of Tyler MPS
28	St. John's AF & AM Lodge	St. John's AF & AM Lodge	December 6, 2005 (#05001403)	323 W. Front St. 32°20′50″N 95°18′14″W	Tyler	
29	St. Louis Southwestern Railway (Cotton Belt) Passenger Depot	St. Louis Southwestern Railway (Cotton Belt) Passenger Depot	August 8, 2001 (#01000873)	100 blk. E. Oakwood St., at N. Spring St. 32°21′17″N 95°17′56″W	Tyler	Historic and Architectural Resources of Tyler MPS
30	Tyler City Hall	Tyler City Hall	March 7, 2007 (#07000129)	212 N. Bonner Ave. 32°21′07″N 95°18′21″W	Tyler	Historic and Architectural Resources of Tyler MPS
31	Tyler Downtown Historic District		October 24, 2022 (#100008283)	Roughly bounded by West Front St., Border Ave., Cotton Belt RR tracks, and Fannin Ave. 32°21′03″N 95°18′03″W	Tyler	
32	Tyler Grocery Company	Tyler Grocery Company	September 14, 2002 (#02000993)	416 N. Broadway; 32°21′15″N 95°18′04″W	Tyler	Historic and Architectural Resources of Tyler MPS
33	Tyler Hydraulic-Fill Dam		August 29, 1977 (#77001543)	W of Tyler off TX 31; 32°19′52″N 95°22′07″W	Tyler	State Antiquities Landmark
34	Tyler Municipal Rose Garden	Tyler Municipal Rose Garden	March 22, 2019 (#100003539)	420 Rose Park Dr. 32°21′07″N 95°18′09″W	Tyler	
35	Tyler US Post Office and Courthouse	Tyler US Post Office and Courthouse	April 25, 2001 (#01000433)	211 W. Ferguson St. 32°21′07″N 95°18′09″W	Tyler	
36	Whitaker-McClendon House	Whitaker-McClendon House	June 2, 1982 (#82004522)	806 W. Houston St. 32°20′36″N 95°18′34″W	Tyler	Recorded Texas Historic Landmark
37	Williams-Anderson House	Williams-Anderson House	September 14, 2002 (#02000995)	1313 W. Claude St. 32°21′09″N 95°18′54″W	Tyler	Historic and Architectural Resources of Tyler MPS

== See also ==
- National Register of Historic Places listings in Texas
- Recorded Texas Historic Landmarks in Smith County
