= Hopkins County Museum and Heritage Park =

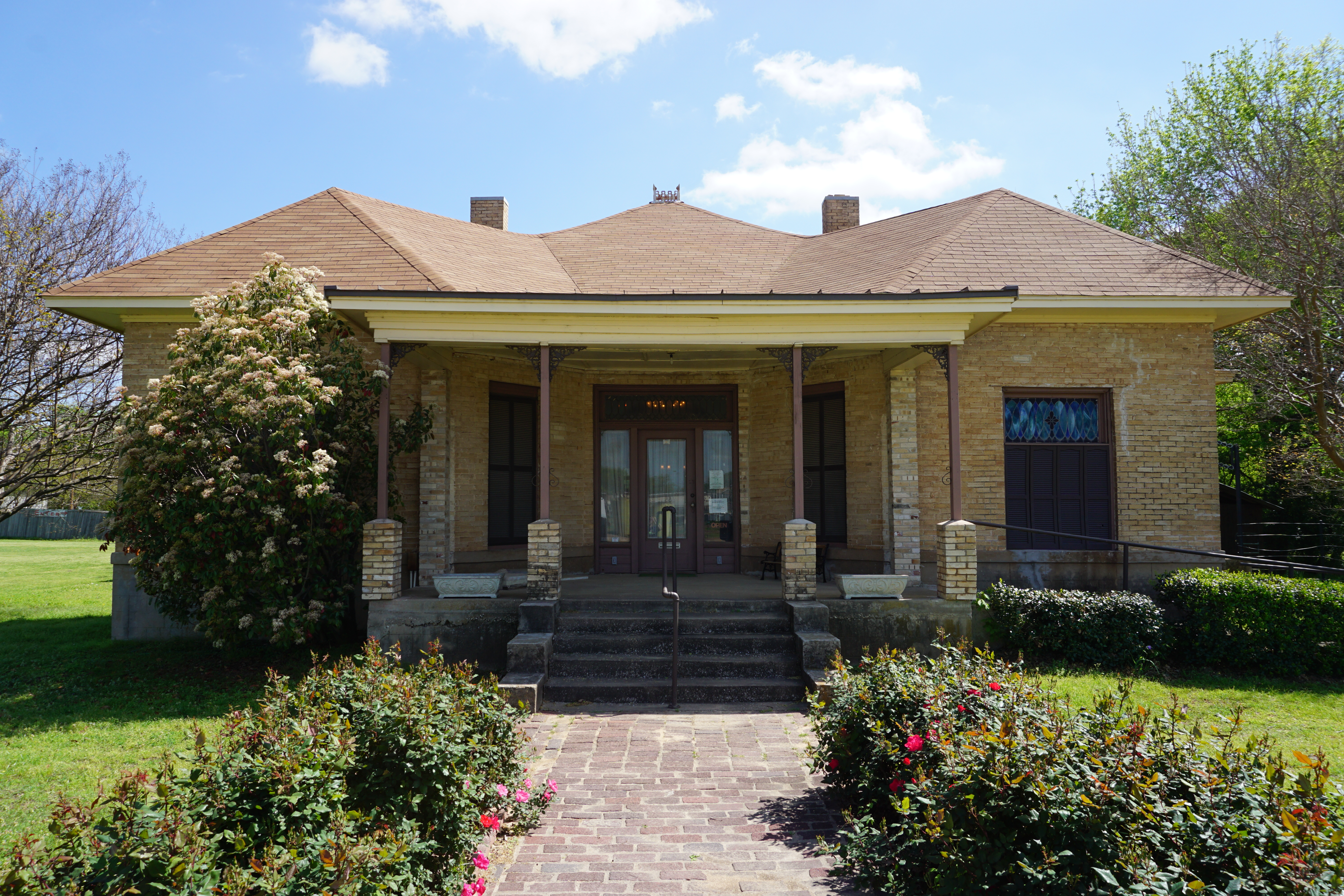
- Exterior of the Hopkins County Museum

- Location within Texas
- Location: Sulphur Springs, Texas
- Coordinates: 33.14237°N 95.595324°W
- Type: Local history museum
- Website: www.hopkinscountymuseum.org

The Hopkins County Museum and Heritage Park is a local history museum documenting Hopkins County, Texas, located in Sulphur Springs, the county seat. It is operated by the Hopkins County Historical Society.

The Hopkins County Museum is located in the George H. Wilson house, which was built in 1910. The house itself is noted for its unique architectural features, including carved columns, a roof made of pressed tin, double-bricked walls, and a Regency-style domed ceiling. All of the building's ceilings are original except one that is from a former local opera house. Its collections include Caddo artifacts, Civil War memorabilia, a doll collection, folk art, Paleolithic fossils, and period women's clothing. The museum also displays a crystal chandelier from Maximilian I's palace in Mexico City. Items that it exhibits have been donated by families living in Hopkins County.

The Heritage Park consists of 11 acres (4.5 ha) of historic houses and other buildings that have been moved to the site. In 2013, there were a total of 11 historic buildings in the Heritage Park, most of which date to the 19th century and have been restored. They include a working blacksmith shop, a chapel, a country store, farmhouses, a gristmill, log houses, and a print shop. The Atkins House, the oldest brick building in the county, is also included. According to the Hopkins County Museum and Heritage Park, the Heritage Park endeavors to replicate "small town Texas around the turn of the century". Sandra Ramani describes it, together with the Museum, as a "capsule of county history".

The Hopkins County Museum and Heritage Park have also held numerous special events, including a Folk Festival in May and Indian Summer in October. Indian Summer days includes a Dutch oven cooking contest as well as archaeological digs, candle dipping, Native American dance and storytelling, and exhibitions of blacksmithing, butter churning, and gristmilling. The Museum and Heritage Park also host a 19th-century-style Christmas celebration, as well as arts and crafts festivals and bluegrass concerts.

According to the Texas Historical Commission, the Museum and Heritage Park are considered historic sites along the former Bankhead Highway.

== Gallery ==
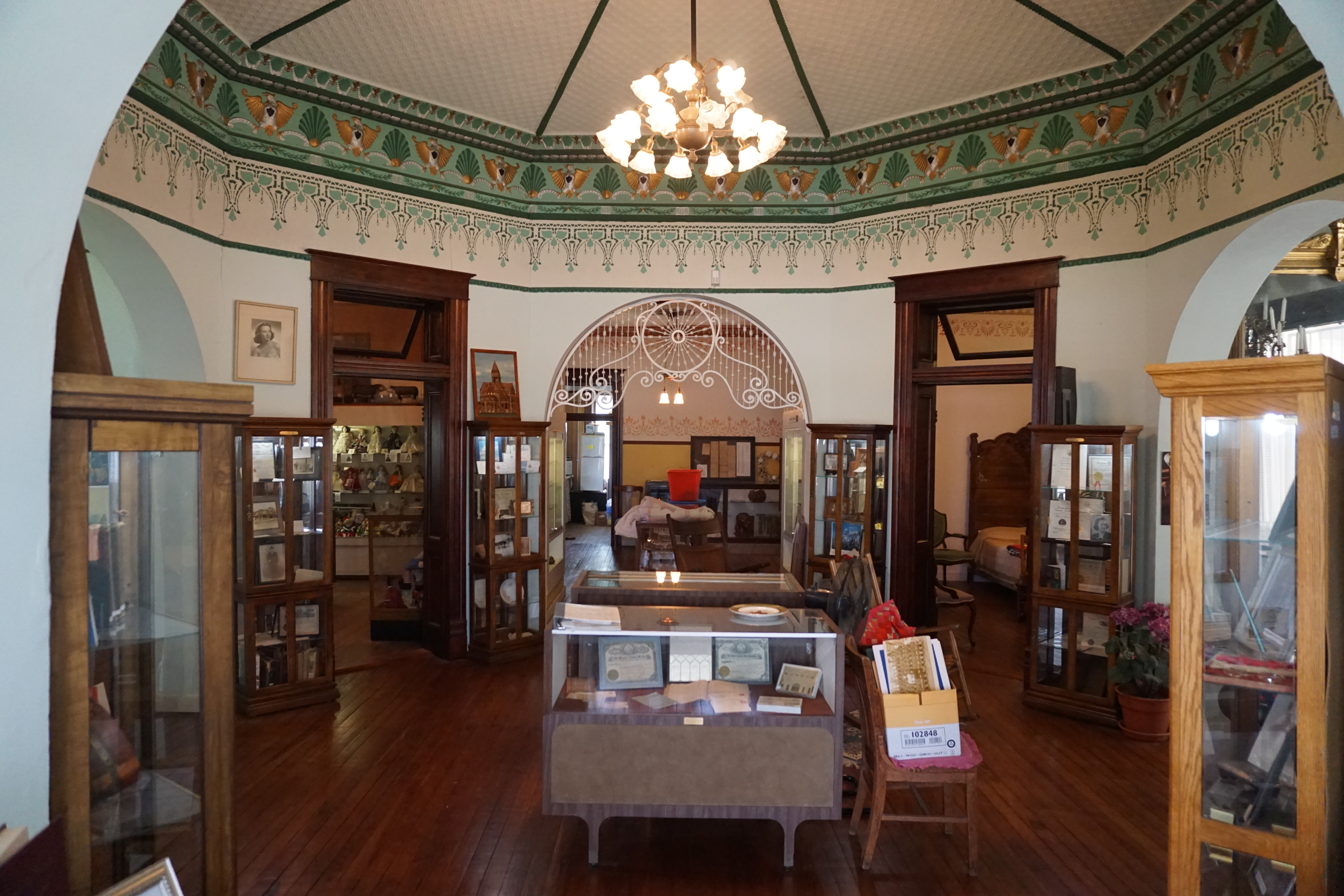
Interior of the Museum

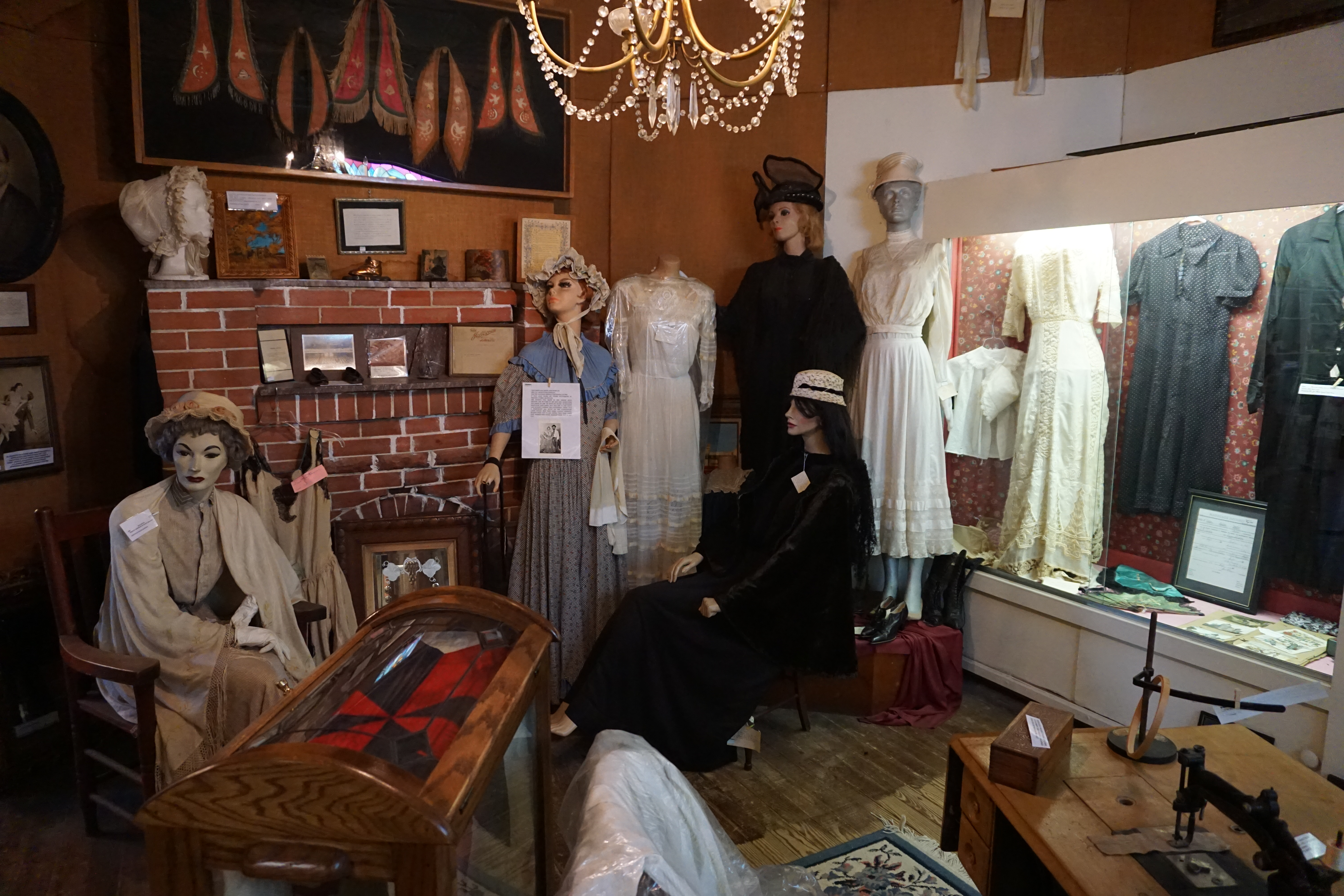
Dress room in the Museum

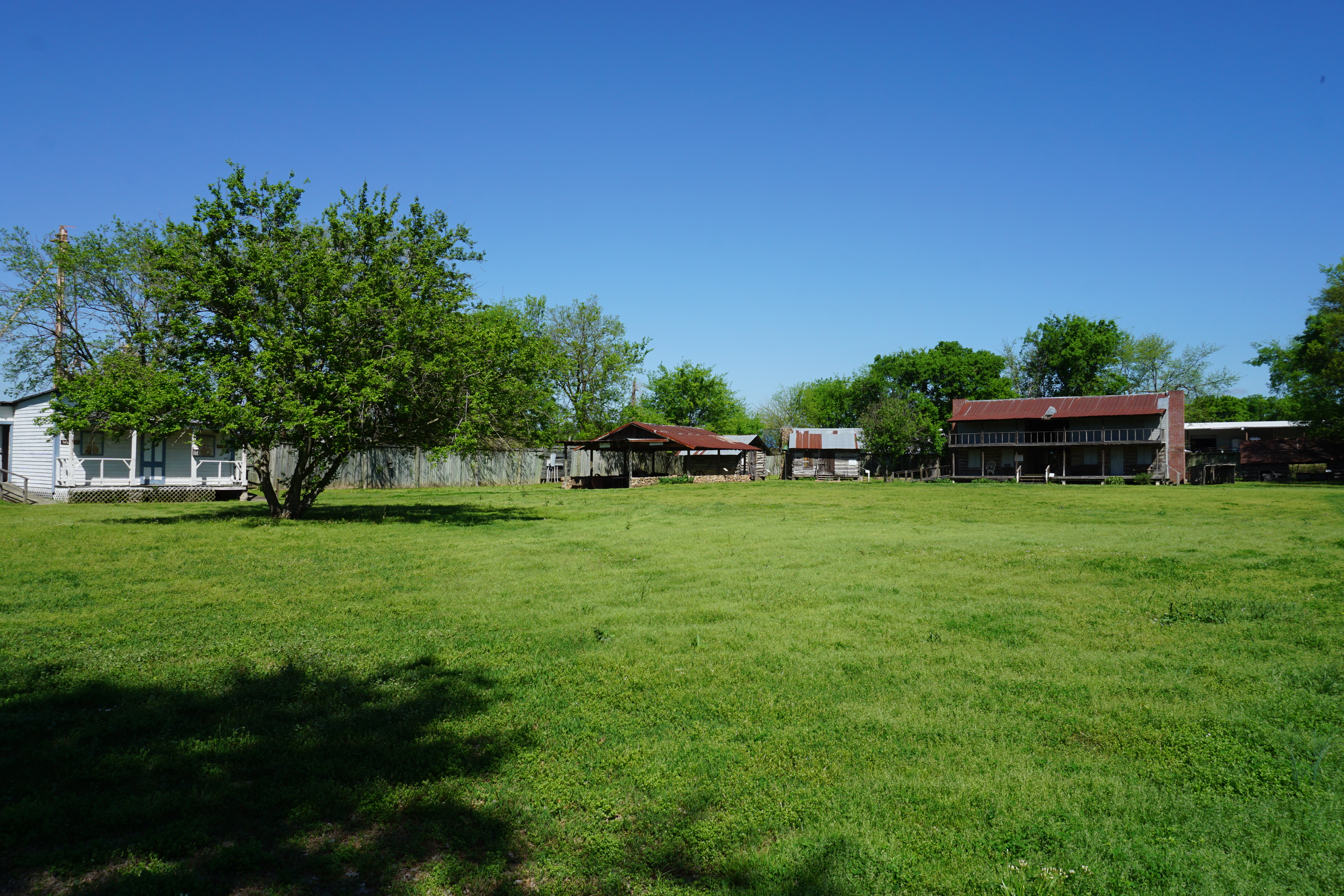
Heritage Park

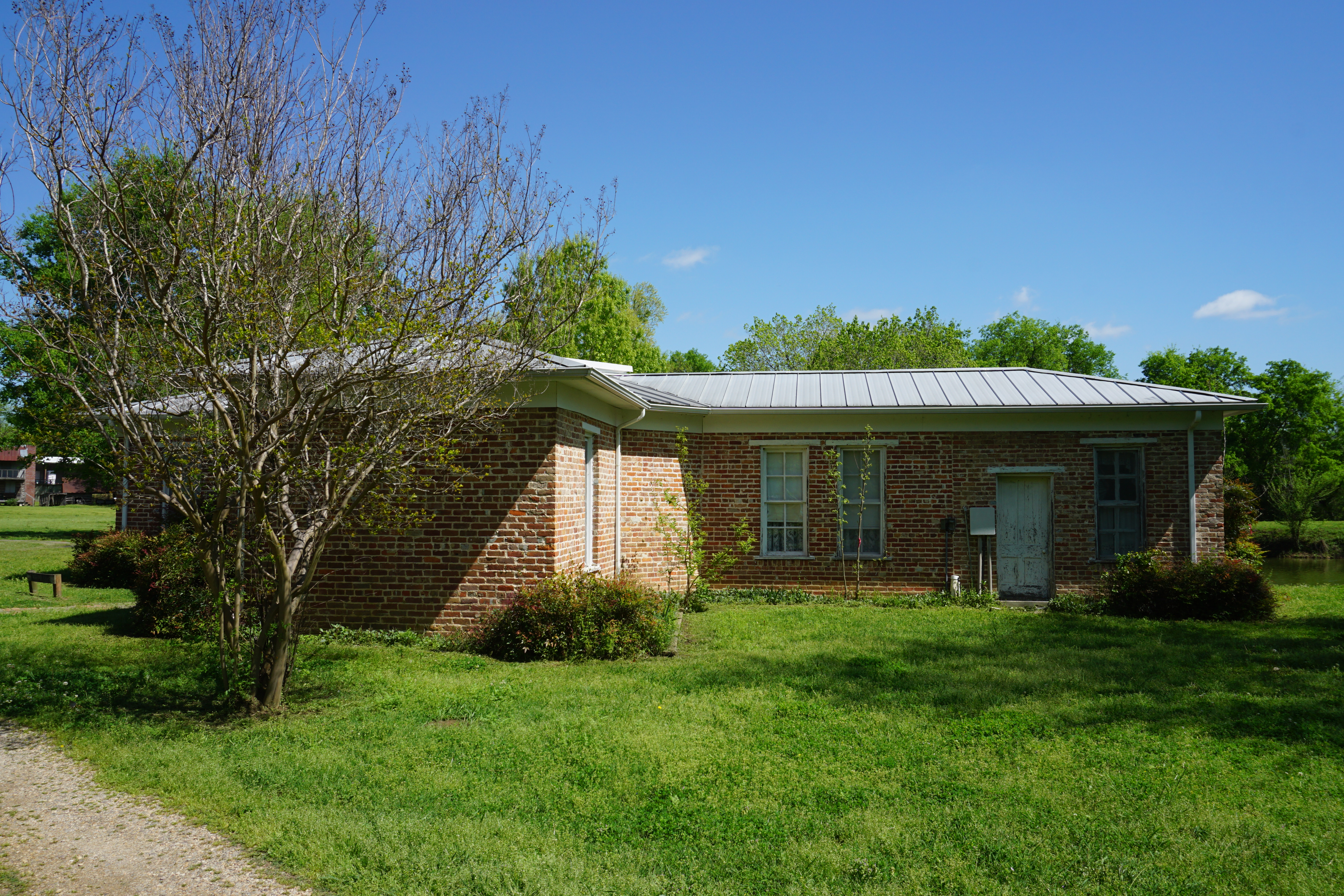
Atkins House
