= Herbert M. Greene =

American architect

Herbert Miller Greene (1871 – February 8, 1932) was an American architect. He designed the Dallas National Bank Building and a number of buildings for the University of Texas at Austin.

Greene was born in Huntington, Pennsylvania, and was educated at the University of Illinois.
