= Whitaker–McClendon House =

Historic house in Texas, United States

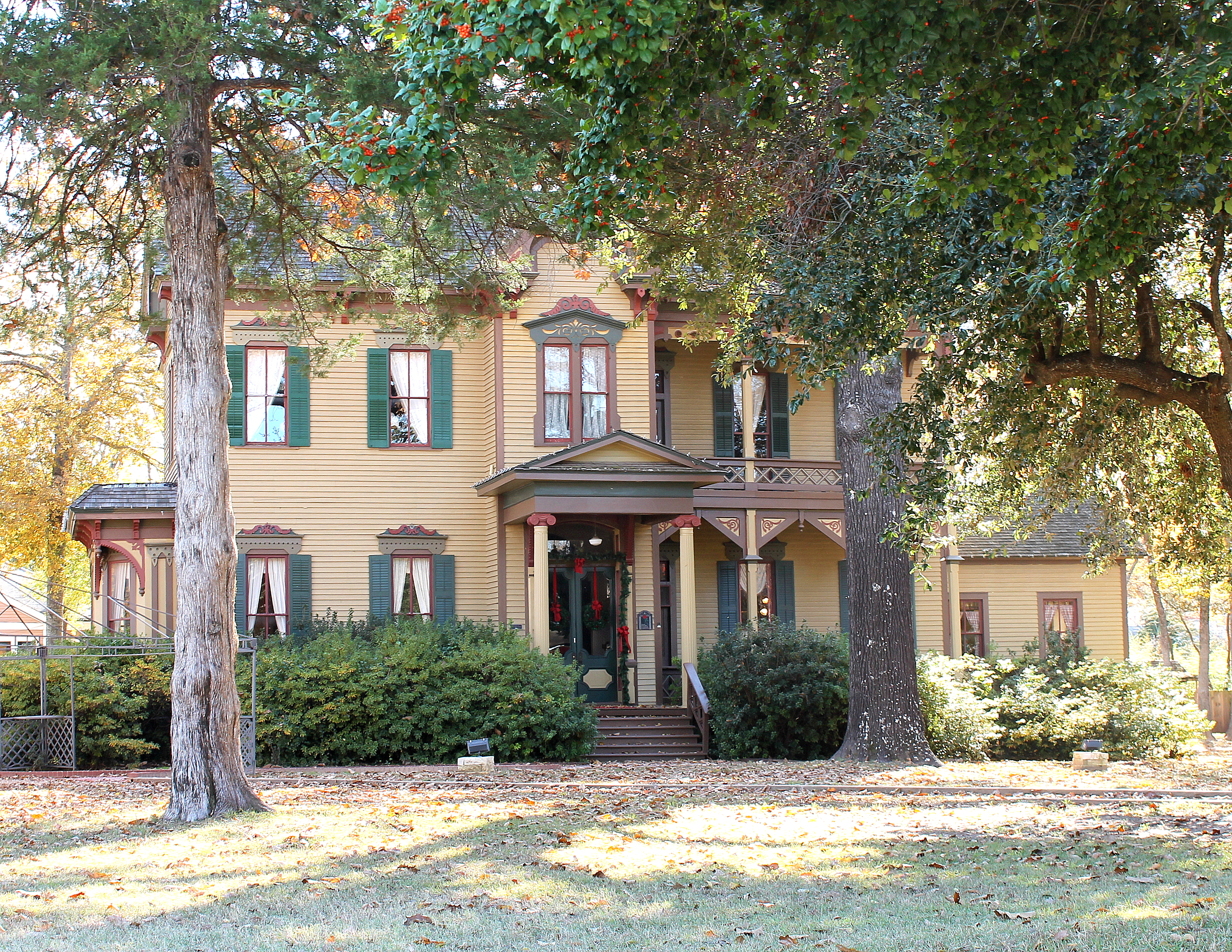
- Whitaker–McClendon House in 2014

- Whitaker–McClendon House (the United States)
- Interactive map showing the location of Whitaker-McClendon House
- Location: 806 W. Houston St. Tyler, Texas
- Coordinates: 32°20′35″N 95°18′32″W
- Type: History
- Website: Whitaker-McClendon House
- Whitaker–McClendon House
- U.S. National Register of Historic Places
- Recorded Texas Historic Landmark
- Area: 2 acres (0.81 ha)
- Built: 1880
- Architectural style: Classical Revival, Stick/Eastlake, Italianate
- NRHP reference No.: 82004522
- RTHL No.: 7767

Significant dates
- Added to NRHP: June 2, 1982
- Designated RTHL: 1988

The Whitaker–McClendon House is a living history museum in Tyler, Texas, United States. The house is also known as the McClendon House, and the Bonner–Whitaker–McClendon House. White House correspondent Sarah McClendon was born and raised in this house. It is listed on the National Register of Historic Places listings in Smith County, is a Recorded Texas Historic Landmark and a Tyler Historical Landmark.

== History ==
This Victorian house, with touches of Italianate and Eastlake architecture, was built 1878–1880 by Harrison Moores Whitaker, a local attorney. The two-story cypress and pine house was constructed on a brick foundation. The first floor consists of the main foyer and living room, one bedroom and bath, plus the kitchen and dining room. Four more bedrooms and two baths are on the second floor. In 1910, ionic columns were added to support the portico. Also added in 1910 was a second-story bedroom with its own separate bathroom, and fronted by a porch. The two-acre parcel of land it sits on once belonged to James Pinckney Henderson, the first governor of Texas. When Whitaker married Mattie, the daughter of Texas Supreme Court justice Micajah H. Bonner, the justice purchased the land as a wedding gift for the newlyweds. Mattie died in 1892. When Mattie's husband remarried in 1903, he relocated to Jefferson County and rented out the house. The house was purchased in 1907 by Anne and Sidney Smith McClendon, the sister and brother-in-law of Mattie Whitaker. White House correspondent Sarah McClendon was born in this house in 1910, the youngest of nine children born to Sidney and Annie McClendon. It was added to the National Register of Historic Places listings in Smith County in 1982, and has been a Recorded Texas Historic Landmark since 1988. The City of Tyler has also listed it as a Tyler Historical Landmark.

== Museum ==
Featured exhibits include artifacts and documents from the Antebellum period of Texas history through both World Wars.

== See also ==
- List of museums in East Texas
- National Register of Historic Places listings in Smith County, Texas
