= Carnegie Public Library (Tyler, Texas) =

Public library in Tyler, Texas, U.S.

Smith County Historical Society and Carnegie Library
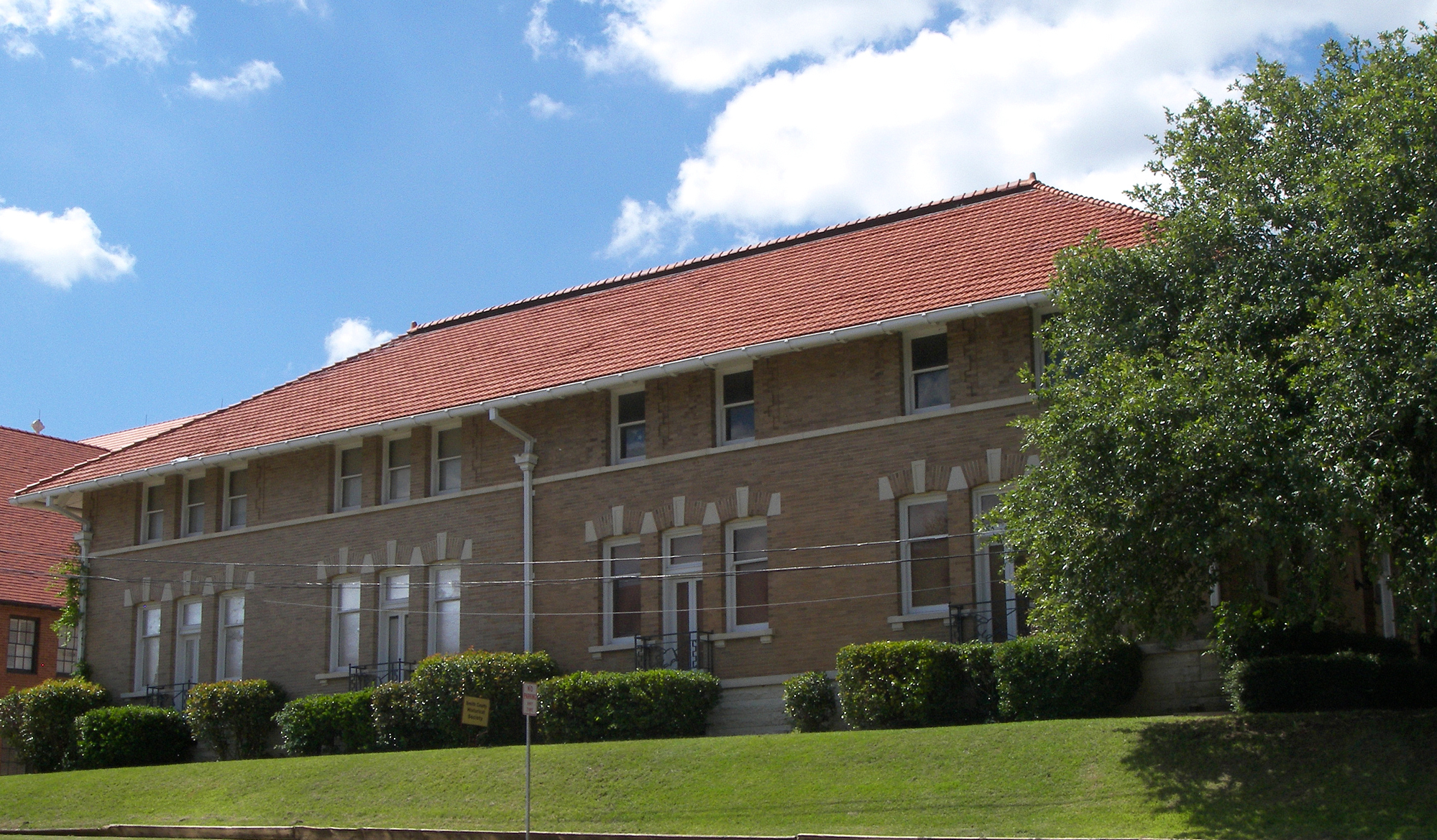
- Tyler Carnegie Library in 2010

- Carnegie Public Library (the United States)
- Established: 1904
- Location: 125 S. College St. Tyler, Texas
- Coordinates: 32°21′0″N 95°18′7″W
- Type: Local history Artifacts; Historical archives Caddo Indian diorama
- Curator: Smith County Historical Society
- Architect: Patton & Miller
- Parking: Free onsite
- Website: Official website
- Carnegie Public Library
- U.S. National Register of Historic Places
- Texas State Antiquities Landmark
- Recorded Texas Historic Landmark
- Area: less than one acre
- Built by: D. Mahoney
- NRHP reference No.: 79003007
- TSAL No.: 8200000564
- RTHL No.: 16531

Significant dates
- Added to NRHP: March 26, 1979
- Designated TSAL: January 1, 1981
- Designated RTHL: 2010

The Smith County Historical Society, housed in the Carnegie Library, is located at 125 S. College Street in the city of Tyler, Smith County, Texas, U.S. It was built in 1904 as the Carnegie Public Library, and added to the National Register of Historic Places listings in Smith County, Texas in 1979. When Tyler built a new public library, the Carnegie building was leased to the Smith County Historical Society and continues to operate as a museum and archives.

== Carnegie library ==
In 1903, Tyler was the recipient of an $15,000 grant from the Andrew Carnegie Library Fund. The grant was part of $645,000 the Fund distributed to thirty-four areas in Texas for the establishments of individual libraries between 1898 and 1917. Philanthropist Andrew Carnegie (1835–1919) encouraged the establishment of libraries in geographical areas by requiring annual matching local funds equal to at least ten percent of the grant itself. Andrew Carnegie's agreement with Tyler was that it would raise $1,500 annually to maintain and operate the library.

The initial matching fund in Tyler was for essentials such as purchase of the land and interior furnishings. Tyler's populace rose to the occasion in support of its proposed library. Portraits of Robert E. Lee and Jefferson Davis were donated by the Mollie Moore Davis Chapter of the Daughters of the Confederacy. Contributions to buy a $2,000 lot from Annie Regina McMahon on which to locate the library came from 172 local citizens. Limestone and brick was used in 1904 for the construction of the library, which was topped with a red tile roof. The area media gave due attention to the fund raising, and generosity of the citizens resulted in everything from botanical gifts for landscaping, to wall hangings, books and publications to fill its shelves, construction materials and services, and a piano for its auditorium. The building was doubled in size in 1936 by a $25,000 expansion project that upgraded the interior lighting. In 1965, a children's literature department was sectioned off from the upstairs auditorium. The building was added to the National Register of Historic Places listings in Smith County, Texas, in 1979.

== Carnegie History Center ==
Upon the 1980 construction of the new Tyler Public Library across the street at 201 S. College, the city of Tyler leased the Carnegie Library to the Smith County Historical Society, at which time the structure was renovated. In 1984, the Carnegie History Center opened in the building, operated by the historical society. In 1959, the historical society was incorporated as a 501(c)(3) nonprofit organization. The history center houses all manner of historical artifacts, archives and resource materials. Donations supplement financial support from the society. Research assistance is provided at a fee. The Carnegie History Center dissolved into the Smith County Historical Society in the 1990s, and the Society maintains all museum exhibits and artifacts.

=== Hours, admission, parking ===
The museum is open to the public five days a week, closed on Sunday and Monday. Admission is free, and the west side of the building has a free parking lot.

== See also ==
- Carnegie Public Library, located in Huntington, West Virginia
- List of museums in East Texas
- National Register of Historic Places listings in Smith County, Texas
- Recorded Texas Historic Landmarks in Smith County
