= National Register of Historic Places listings in Henderson County, Texas =

Location of Henderson County in Texas

This is a list of the National Register of Historic Places listings in Henderson County, Texas.

This is intended to be a complete list of properties listed on the National Register of Historic Places in Henderson County, Texas. There is one property listed on the National Register in the county, a property that is also a Recorded Texas Historic Landmark.

This National Park Service list is complete through NPS recent listings posted July 18, 2025.

== Current listings ==
The locations of National Register properties may be seen in a mapping service provided.

	Name on the Register	Image	Date listed	Location	City or town	Description
1	Faulk and Gauntt Building	Faulk and Gauntt Building	June 9, 1980 (#80004135)	217 N. Prairieville St. 32°12′21″N 95°51′19″W	Athens	Recorded Texas Historic Landmark

== See also ==
- National Register of Historic Places listings in Texas
- Recorded Texas Historic Landmarks in Henderson County
