= National Register of Historic Places listings in Hall County, Texas =

Location of Hall County in Texas

This is a list of the National Register of Historic Places listings in Hall County, Texas.

This is intended to be a complete list of properties listed on the National Register of Historic Places in Hall County, Texas. There are two properties listed on the National Register in the county. Both properties are Recorded Texas Historic Landmarks including one that is also a State Antiquities Landmark.

This National Park Service list is complete through NPS recent listings posted March 21, 2025.

== Current listings ==
The locations of National Register properties may be seen in a mapping service provided.

	Name on the Register	Image	Date listed	Location	City or town	Description
1	Hall County Courthouse	Hall County Courthouse	October 1, 2008 (#08000961)	512 W. Main; 34°43′31″N 100°32′06″W	Memphis	State Antiquities Landmark, Recorded Texas Historic Landmark
2	Hotel Turkey	Hotel Turkey	October 24, 1991 (#91001521)	Jct. of 3rd and Alexander Sts. 34°23′38″N 100°53′51″W	Turkey	Recorded Texas Historic Landmark

== See also ==
- National Register of Historic Places listings in Texas
- Recorded Texas Historic Landmarks in Hall County
