= M and J Nelson Building =

- U.S. National Register of Historic Places
- Recorded Texas Historic Landmark
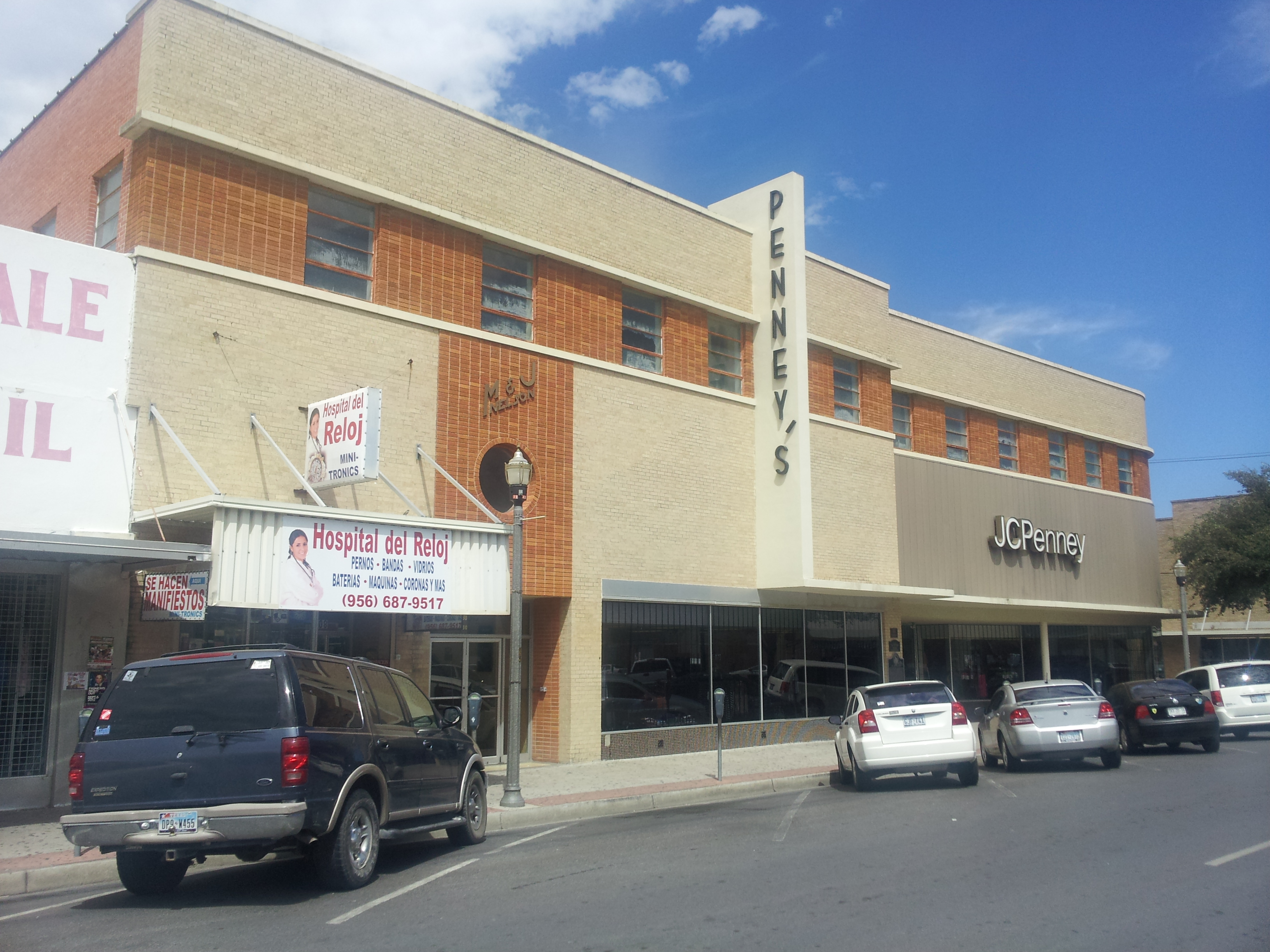
- Border Theater

- Location within Texas Location within the United States
- Location: 300 South Main Street. McAllen, Texas
- Coordinates: 26°12′05″N 98°14′07″W
- Area: less than one acre
- Built: 1949
- Built by: Morris Randall Nelson and Jack Nelson
- Architect: Gillette and Bell
- Architectural style: Modernistic
- NRHP reference No.: 08000962
- RTHL No.: 12060

Significant dates
- Added to NRHP: October 1, 2008
- Designated RTHL: 2007

The M and J Nelson Building (also known as the J. C. Penney Building) is a building in downtown McAllen, Texas, that is listed in the National Register of Historic Places and is a Recorded Texas Historic Landmark.

It is a three-story reinforced concrete two-part commercial block building built between 1948 and 1950 for the J. C. Penney Company. It was built in Streamlined Moderne style, with horizontal bands of red and buff brick and cast stone trim, and with aluminum entrance doors and stair rails and two exterior display cases at its Chicago Avenue entrance.

It was one of few buildings in McAllen having an elevator at the time it was built, and one of few with air conditioning.

== See also ==
- National Register of Historic Places listings in Hidalgo County, Texas
- Recorded Texas Historic Landmarks in Hidalgo County
