= National Register of Historic Places listings in Hidalgo County, Texas =

Location of Hidalgo County in Texas

This is a list of the National Register of Historic Places listings in Hidalgo County, Texas

This is intended to be a complete list of properties and districts listed on the National Register of Historic Places in Hidalgo County, Texas. There are five districts and 19 individual properties listed on the National Register in the county. One property is a State Antiquities Landmark. Eight properties are designated Recorded Texas Historic Landmarks (RTHLs) while two districts and two more individual properties contain RTHLs within their boundaries.

This National Park Service list is complete through NPS recent listings posted May 15, 2026.

== Current listings ==
The locations of National Register properties and districts may be seen in a mapping service provided.

	Name on the Register	Image	Date listed	Location	City or town	Description
1	1910 Hidalgo County Jail	1910 Hidalgo County Jail	May 26, 2020 (#100005230)	121 East McIntyre St. 26°18′09″N 98°09′42″W	Edinburg	Recorded Texas Historic Landmark
2	Border Theater	Border Theater	August 28, 1998 (#98001124)	905 North Conway Blvd. 26°12′54″N 98°19′33″W	Mission	Recorded Texas Historic Landmark
3	Casa de Palmas	Casa de Palmas	April 18, 2003 (#03000276)	101 N. Main St. 26°12′17″N 98°14′04″W	McAllen	Recorded Texas Historic Landmark
4	Cine El Rey	Cine El Rey	April 26, 2002 (#02000402)	311 S. 17th St. 26°12′05″N 98°14′17″W	McAllen	
5	Cortez Hotel	Cortez Hotel	December 23, 2004 (#04001397)	260 S. Texas Ave. 26°09′33″N 97°59′27″W	Weslaco	Recorded Texas Historic Landmark
6	El Sal Del Rey Archeological District		August 27, 1979 (#79002977)	Address Restricted; 26°32′16″N 98°03′24″W	Linn	
7	Mary S. and Gordon Griffin House	Mary S. and Gordon Griffin House	June 13, 2014 (#14000341)	704 N. 15th Street; 26°12′38″N 98°14′03″W	McAllen	
8	La Lomita Historic District	La Lomita Historic District	May 28, 1975 (#75002165)	5 mi (8.0 km). S of Mission on FM 1016; 26°09′12″N 98°19′32″W	Mission	Includes Recorded Texas Historic Landmark
9	Lomita Boulevard Commercial Historic District	Lomita Boulevard Commercial Historic District	September 18, 1998 (#98001184)	400 to 700 Blocks N. Conway Blvd. 26°12′40″N 98°19′34″W	Mission	
10	Louisiana-Rio Grande Canal Company Irrigation System	Louisiana-Rio Grande Canal Company Irrigation System	November 8, 1995 (#95001284)	S. 2nd St. at River Levee; 26°05′49″N 98°15′42″W	Hidalgo	Address is for First pump station. Listings also includes second pump station in McAllen and approximately 45000 acres of canals in southern Hidalgo County.
11	M and J Nelson Building	M and J Nelson Building	October 1, 2008 (#08000962)	300-308 S. 14th St. 26°12′05″N 98°14′06″W	McAllen	Recorded Texas Historic Landmark
12	McAllen Ranch		April 18, 2007 (#07000337)	FM 1017, 13 mi (21 km). W of TX 281; 26°37′25″N 98°18′02″W	Linn	
13	Sam and Marjorie Miller House	Sam and Marjorie Miller House	July 9, 1997 (#97000780)	707 N. 15th St. 26°12′39″N 98°14′04″W	McAllen	Recorded Texas Historic Landmark
14	Mission Canal Company Second Lift Pumphouse	Mission Canal Company Second Lift Pumphouse	August 30, 2002 (#02000910)	6th St. and Canal; 26°12′43″N 98°19′51″W	Mission	
15	Mission Citrus Growers Union Packing Shed	Mission Citrus Growers Union Packing Shed	August 30, 2002 (#02000911)	824 W. Business TX 83; 26°12′56″N 98°19′56″W	Mission	
16	Oblate Park Historic District	Oblate Park Historic District	December 22, 2005 (#05001459)	Roughly bounded by Doherty, Keralum, W. 16th St. and W 10th St. 26°13′13″N 98°19′17″W	Mission	Includes Recorded Texas Historic Landmark
17	Old Hidalgo Courthouse and Buildings	Old Hidalgo Courthouse and Buildings	February 1, 1980 (#80004136)	Flora and 1st Sts. 26°05′57″N 98°15′44″W	Hidalgo	Includes Recorded Texas Historic Landmarks
18	Old Hidalgo School	Old Hidalgo School	October 24, 1979 (#79002976)	Flora and 4th Sts. 26°05′55″N 98°15′35″W	Hidalgo	State Antiquities Landmark
19	Rancho Toluca		July 21, 1983 (#83004513)	FM 1015; 26°04′14″N 97°56′43″W	Progreso	Includes Recorded Texas Historic Landmarks
20	Roosevelt School Auditorium and Classroom Addition	Roosevelt School Auditorium and Classroom Addition	August 30, 2002 (#02000909)	407 E. 3rd St. 26°12′30″N 98°19′21″W	Mission	
21	Shary Heights	Shary Heights	February 26, 2026 (#100012751)	Roughly bounded by the northern property line along Ebony Lane on the north, Shary Municipal Golf Course on the east, former Big Melch Canal on the south, and North Conway Avenue on the west 26°13′27″N 98°19′21″W	Mission	
22	John Shary Building	John Shary Building	August 30, 2002 (#02000907)	900 Doherty; 26°12′53″N 98°19′28″W	Mission	Recorded Texas Historic Landmark
23	Teatro La Paz	Teatro La Paz	August 30, 2002 (#02000908)	514,516,518 Doherty; 26°12′39″N 98°19′31″W	Mission	Recorded Texas Historic Landmark
24	Valley Fruit Company	Valley Fruit Company	December 7, 2011 (#11000897)	724 N. Cage Blvd. 26°12′06″N 98°10′54″W	Pharr	

== See also ==
- National Register of Historic Places listings in Texas
- Recorded Texas Historic Landmarks in Hidalgo County
