= Mission Citrus Growers Union Packing Shed =

- U.S. National Register of Historic Places
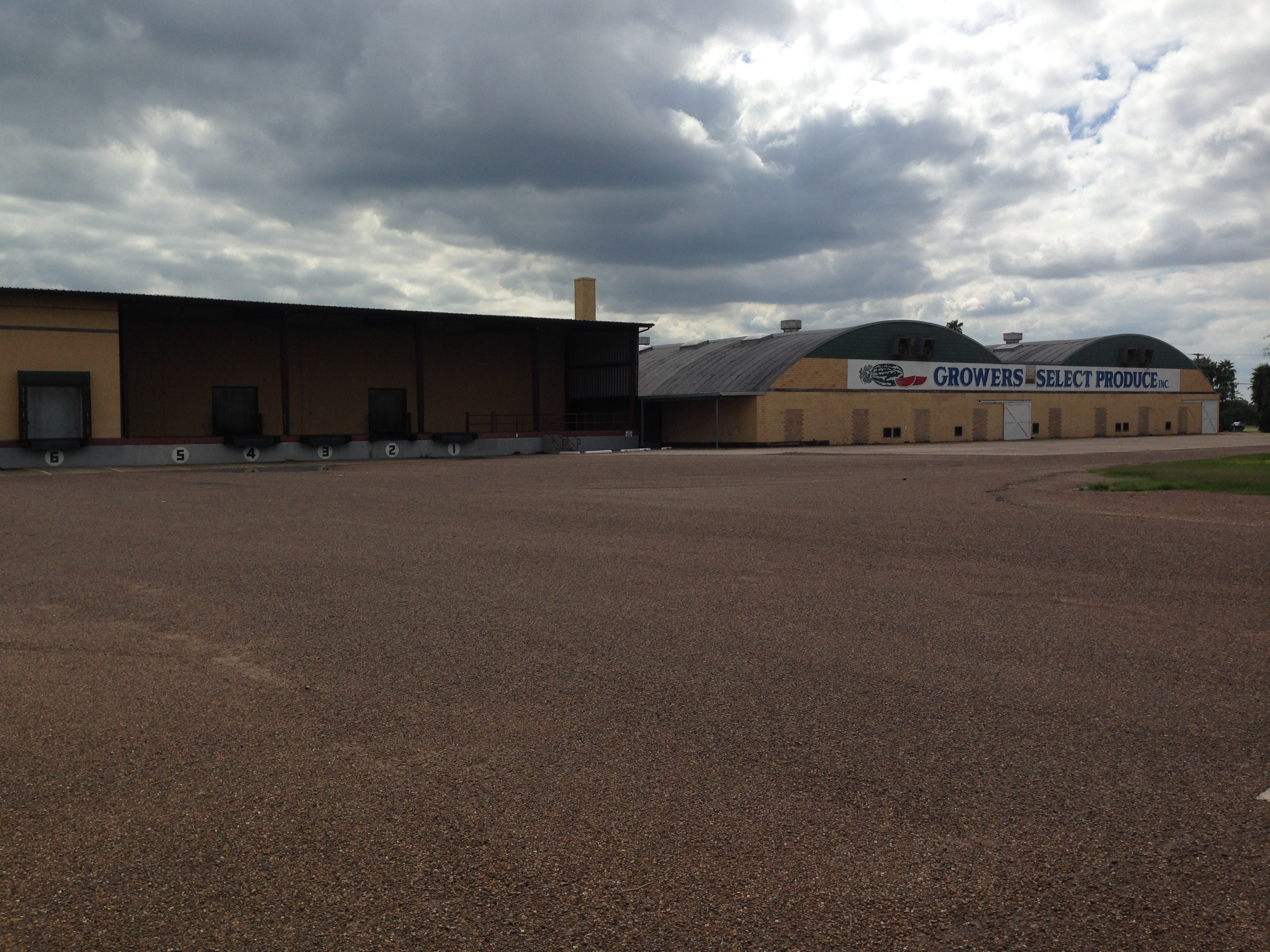
- Mission Citrus Growers Union Packing Shed

- Location within Texas Location within the United States
- Location: 824 W. Bus. US 83, Mission, Texas
- Coordinates: 26°12′56″N 98°19′56″W
- Area: 4.5 acres (1.8 ha)
- Built: 1944
- Built by: Nossier Lumber Company
- Architect: Edwin Nossier
- MPS: Mission, Hidalgo County MPS
- NRHP reference No.: 02000911
- Added to NRHP: August 30, 2002

The Mission Citrus Growers Union Packing Shed in Mission, Texas, also known as Edinburg Citrus Association and as Growers Select Produce Packing Shed, is a historic packing house. It was built in 1944. It was listed on the National Register of Historic Places in 2002.

It was "organized and promoted" by John H. Shary, a grower and developer who first came to the area in 1911.

== See also ==
- National Register of Historic Places listings in Hidalgo County, Texas
- Recorded Texas Historic Landmarks in Hidalgo County
