= Hotel Turkey =

- U.S. National Register of Historic Places
- Recorded Texas Historic Landmark
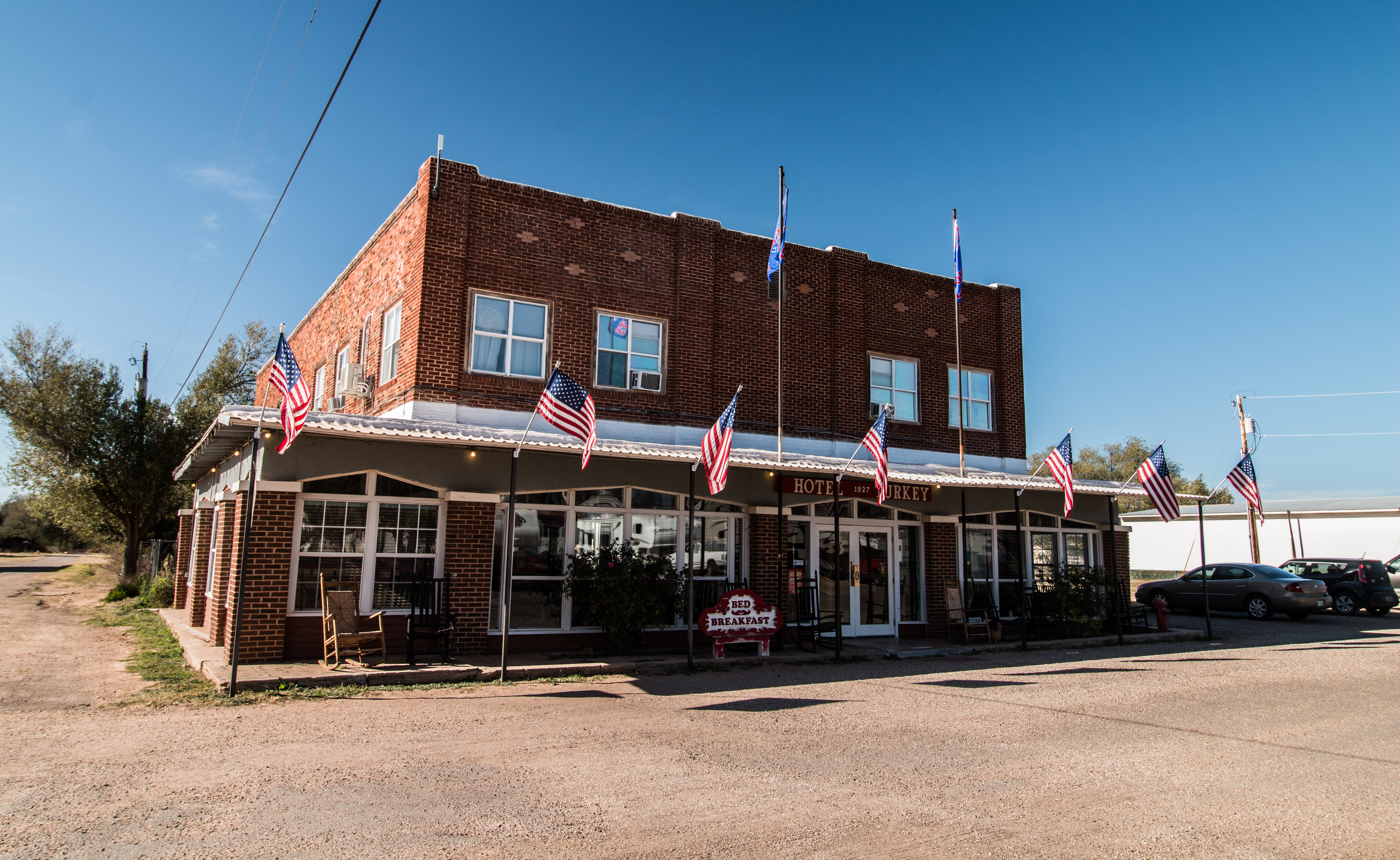
- Hotel Turkey

- Location within Texas Location within the United States
- Location: Jct. of 3rd and Alexander Sts. Turkey, Texas
- Coordinates: 34°23′38″N 100°53′51″W
- Area: less than one acre
- Built: 1927
- Architectural style: Prairie School
- NRHP reference No.: 91001521
- RTHL No.: 2575

Significant dates
- Added to NRHP: October 24, 1991
- Designated RTHL: 1985

The Hotel Turkey is a historic hotel located in Turkey, Texas, United States that originally opened in 1927. The building was added to the National Register of Historic Places on October 24, 1991.

The two-story reddish-brown brick Prairie School designed structure was built by H. B. Jordan to take advantage of the extension of the Fort Worth and Denver South Plains Railway to the town of Turkey. On June 12, 1927, the building was partially complete when a tornado leveled it. Construction resumed shortly thereafter, and Hotel Turkey opened for business in November 1927.

The hotel was located three blocks from the train depot and provided a meeting room to the traveling salesmen of the day to display their wares to the townspeople. The hotel also became a social center for the community as dances, banquets, and meetings of social and civic organizations took place in the dining room and lobby.

The building has had several owners through the years but has operated continuously since it opened. In September 1988, Scott and Jane Johnson purchased and renovated Hotel Turkey. The hotel then had 14 patriotic, western or movie themed rooms such as the Gone with the Wind suite.

In July 2015, the Hotel Turkey was purchased and re-established by Pat and Tina Carson of Turkey. They have made numerous renovations and continue to do so.

The hotel traditionally hosts the musicians who come to Turkey for the annual Bob Wills Day celebration on the last Saturday in April. George W. Bush, while still governor of Texas, once stayed at the hotel.

== See also ==
- National Register of Historic Places listings in Hall County, Texas
- Recorded Texas Historic Landmarks in Hall County
