= Border Theater =

- U.S. National Register of Historic Places
- Recorded Texas Historic Landmark
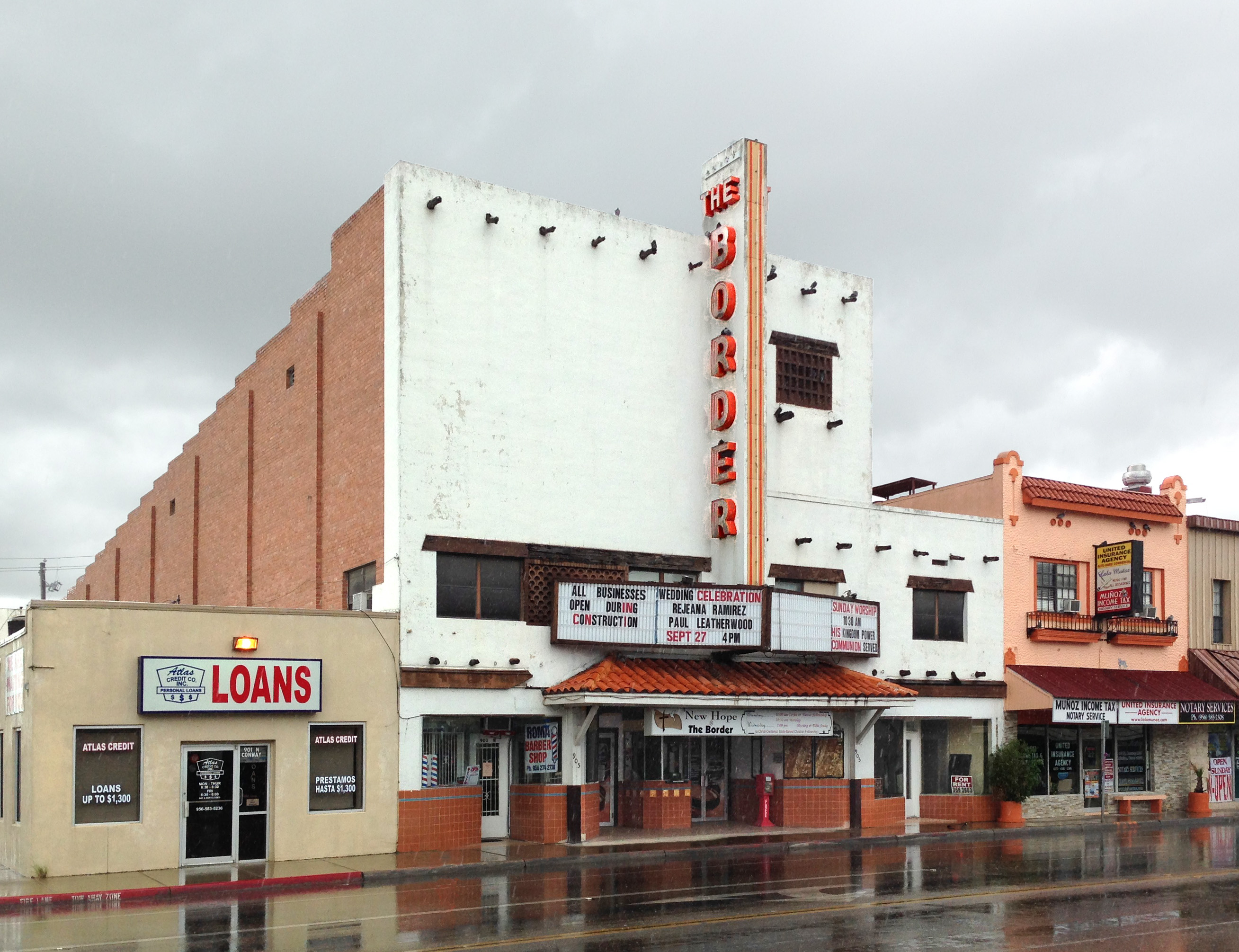
- Border Theater in 2014

- Location within Texas Location within the United States
- Location: 905 North Conway Blvd. Mission, Texas
- Coordinates: 26°12′54″N 98°19′33″W
- Area: less than 1 acre (0.40 ha)
- Built: 1942
- Built by: George Holliday
- Architect: William J. Moore
- Architectural style: Pueblo Revival
- MPS: Mission, Hidalgo County MPS (64500644)
- NRHP reference No.: 98001124
- RTHL No.: 12060

Significant dates
- Added to NRHP: 28 August 1998
- Designated RTHL: 1997

The Border Theater is a historic movie theater in Mission, Texas. Located at 905 North Conway Boulevard it is in the city's central business district. Built in 1942 it continues to operate as an entertainment venue. It was listed on the National Register of Historic Places on 28 August 1998.

The theater was the flagship operation for the Rio Grande Valley theater owners Robert N. and Dell Smith. They hired Dallas architect William J. Moore to design the building and George Holliday was the general contractor. The opening of Moore Army Air Corps Field in 1941 created a market for entertainment. The Smith brothers at one point had five facilities in South Texas. The movie shown at the opening on 3 April 1942 was a Roy Rogers film, Heart of the Rio Grande.

The facade presents elements of Pueblo Revival architecture with its stucco exterior, faux vigas and heavy wooden lintels. Stucco covers the entire front of the building wrapping around each side. Vigas are evenly spaced across the facade three feet below the roofline and above the portico. A large marquee attached to the facade and extending above the roofline bears the theater's name in large red letters. A five sided ticket booth is flanked by inset entrance doors. The ticket booth is bordered with terracotta tiles and faced with several decorative tiles with southwestern scenes.

The theater has seating for 500 on a main floor and balcony. The balcony retains the original "Floating Comfort" International seating while the main floor seating was replaced in 1967. Two large murals fill the long side walls of the theater. These murals show idealized scenes of Hispanic life in the area before Anglo occupation. Originally fluorescent paint was used so, illuminated with blacklight these murals could be seen when the house lights were dimmed. They were painted in 1942 by artist E. Risser of the Dallas firm King Scene Company from images copyrighted by McCrossen Manufacturing Company of Santa Fe.

The two and three story building faces east onto Conway Blvd. One in a row of commercial buildings it is the dominant architectural resource on the block. It is built with a wood frame and common-bond brick veneer. The north and south walls are stepped parapets with buttress-like brickwork adding visual support and matching the step downs. These tall walls are visible above the nearby buildings. The facade is an asymmetrical 2 part composition. In an arrangement typical of movie theaters of the time the theater and a small store occupy a 3-story part of the building with a 2-story wing extending north.

There is a small retail space to the south of the entrance also finished with stucco and terracotta. The two story northern portion of the building is a separate commercial space with large display windows and a door at an angle to the street. This space is also similarly finished. Upstairs windows feature heavy wooden lintels and decorative wooden grates. A large spandrel beam extends the full length of the facade. When originally finished the building included office spaces, a clinic, two store and two apartments.

In the 1990s a metal canopy spanning the entire facade was replaced with a narrow hip roof of Spanish tile over the entry. The screen was replaced with a wide view Cinemascope screen in 1952. Despite these and other minor changes the theater retains the design and atmosphere of the time of its construction. It remains a rare well preserved example of Pueblo Revival architecture in an area where Spanish Colonial Revival architecture predominates. Official Texas Historical Marker #12060 at the nearby corner commemorates the Border Theater's listing as a Recorded Texas Historical Landmark in 1997.

== See also ==
- National Register of Historic Places listings in Hidalgo County, Texas
- Recorded Texas Historic Landmarks in Hidalgo County
