= Hall County Courthouse (Texas) =

- U.S. National Register of Historic Places
- Recorded Texas Historic Landmark
- Texas State Antiquities Landmark
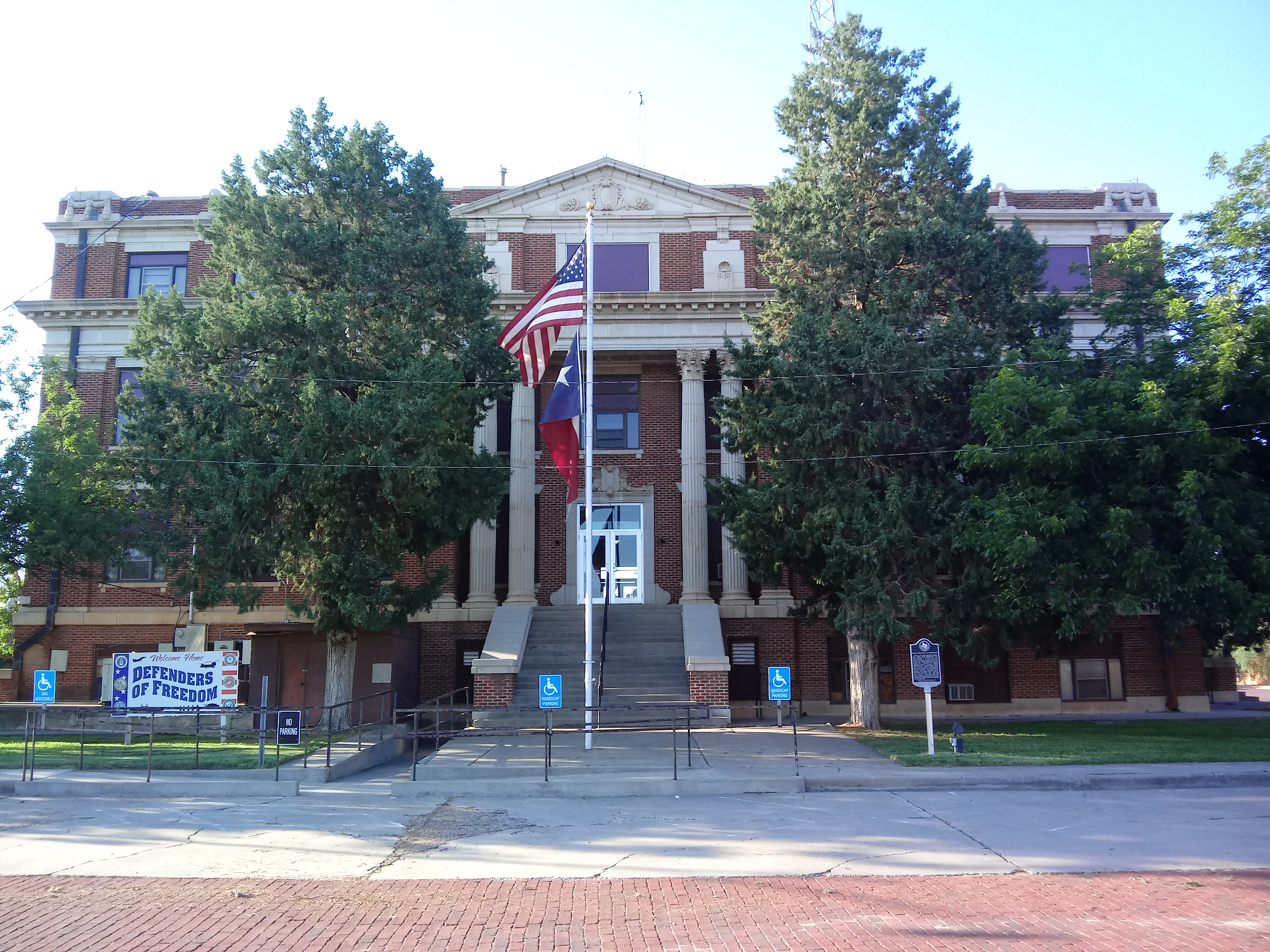
- Hall County Courthouse

- Location within Texas Location within the United States
- Interactive map showing the location of Hall County Courthouse
- Location: 512 W. Main, Memphis, Texas
- Coordinates: 34°43′35″N 100°32′11″W
- Area: less than one acre
- Built: 1923
- Architect: Page Brothers, et al.
- Architectural style: Classical Revival
- NRHP reference No.: 08000961
- RTHL No.: 2337
- TSAL No.: 3121

Significant dates
- Added to NRHP: October 1, 2008
- Designated RTHL: 2008
- Designated TSAL: 7/25/2008

Hall County Courthouse in Memphis, Texas is a historic courthouse built in 1923. It was listed on the National Register of Historic Places on October 1, 2008.

The four story, red brick building is a Classical Revival design with Beaux Arts influences. Each facade of the building features a two-story loggia with paired Corinthian columns.

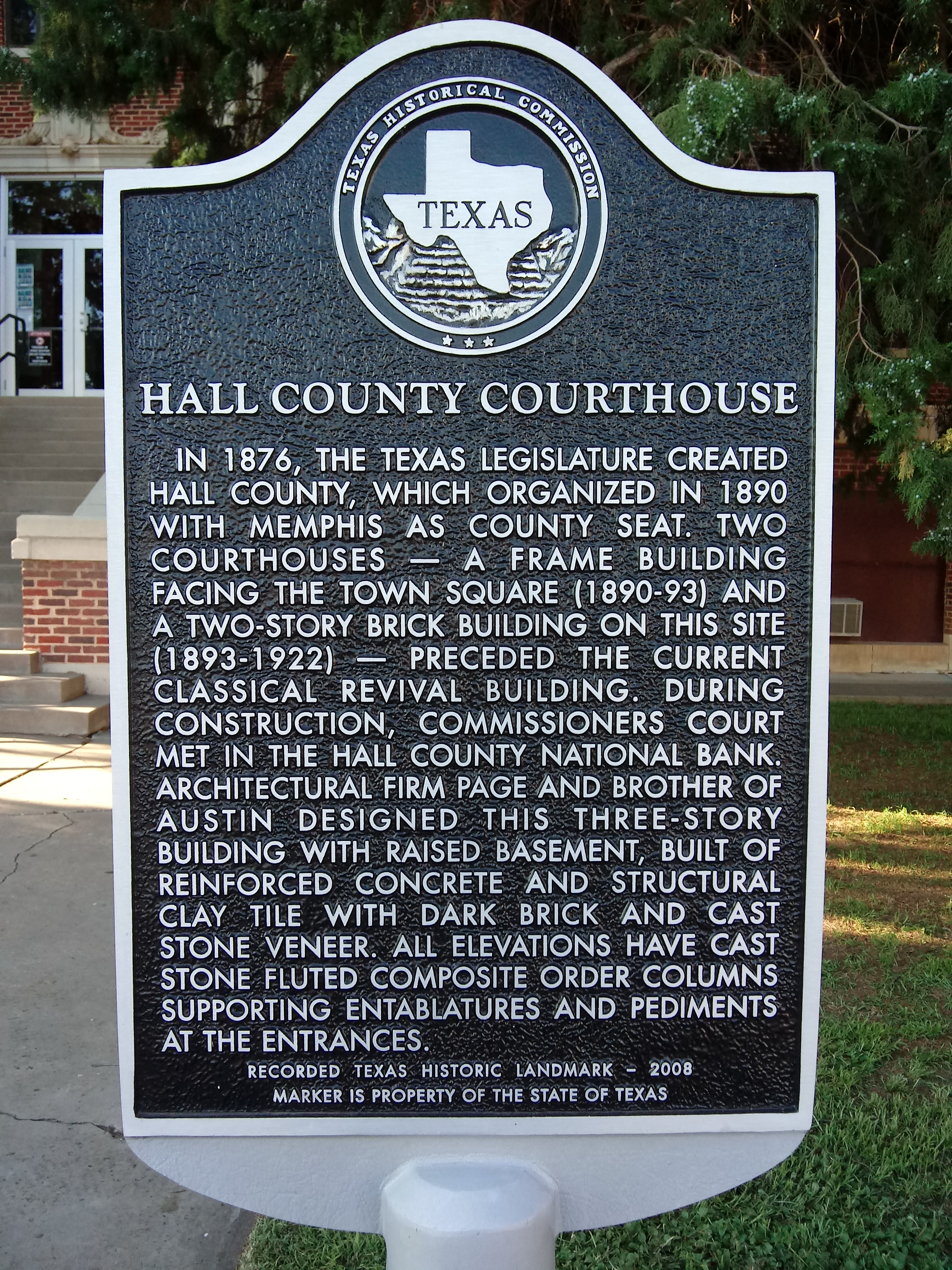
Image of historical marker on courthouse lawn

== See also ==
- National Register of Historic Places listings in Hall County, Texas
- Recorded Texas Historic Landmarks in Hall County
- List of county courthouses in Texas
