= Faulk and Gauntt Building =

- U.S. National Register of Historic Places
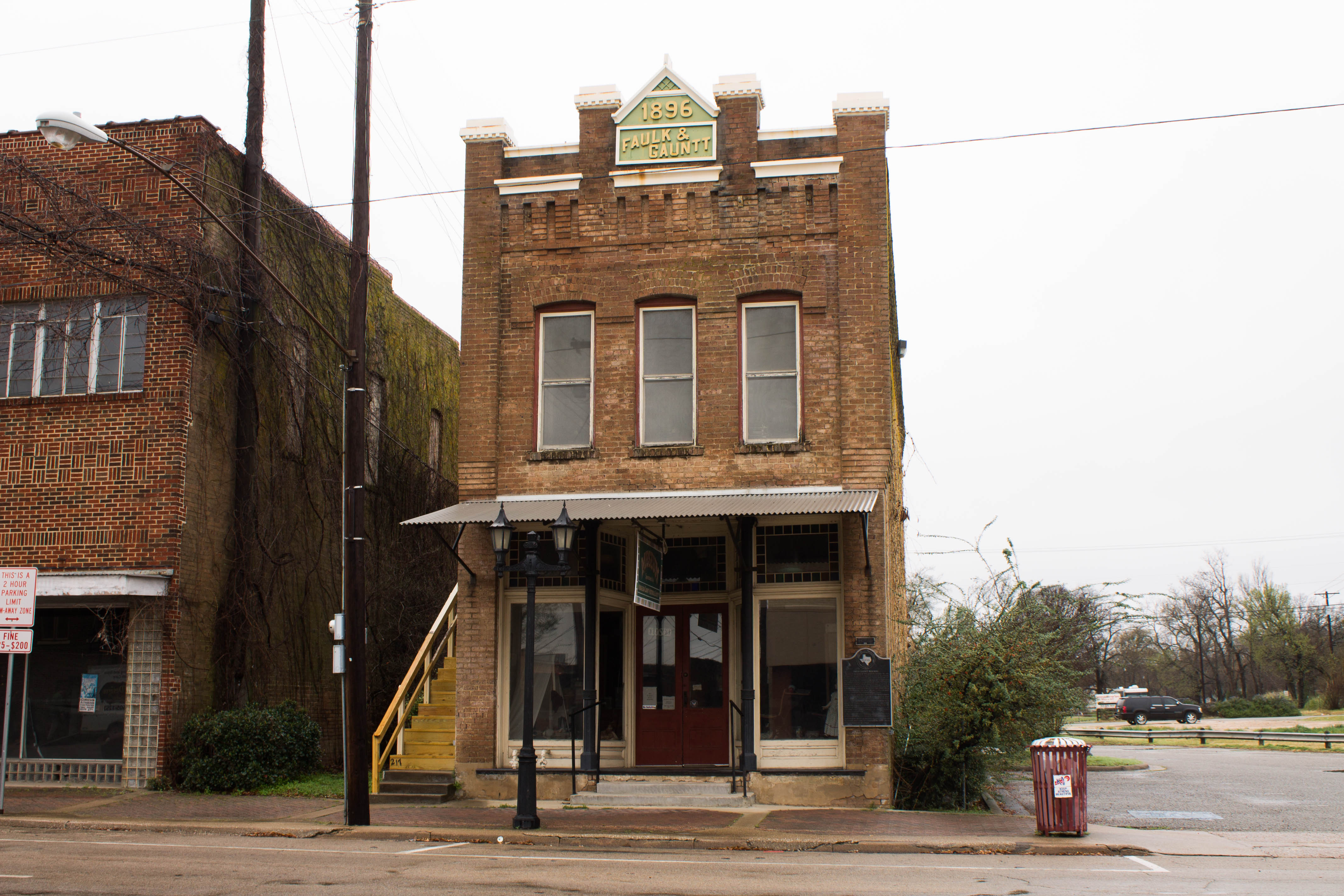

- Location within Texas Location within the United States
- Location: 217 N. Prairieville St., Athens, Texas
- Coordinates: 32°12′21″N 95°51′19″W
- Area: less than one acre
- Built: 1896
- Built by: Hawn Lumber Co.
- Architectural style: Late Victorian
- NRHP reference No.: 80004135
- Added to NRHP: June 9, 1980

The Faulk and Gauntt Building, at 217 N. Prairieville St. in Athens, Texas, was built in 1896. It was listed on the National Register of Historic Places in 1980.

It is also a Recorded Texas Historic Landmark.

It was deemed significant as "an excellent example of late Victorian commercial architecture. It is one of the few Athens buildings which remains intact from the prosperous railroad era. Furthermore, the history of ownership of the site and structure includes several pioneer families of the community."
