= Kennedy Bakery =

Historic building in Houston, Texas, U.S.

- U.S. National Register of Historic Places
- Recorded Texas Historic Landmark
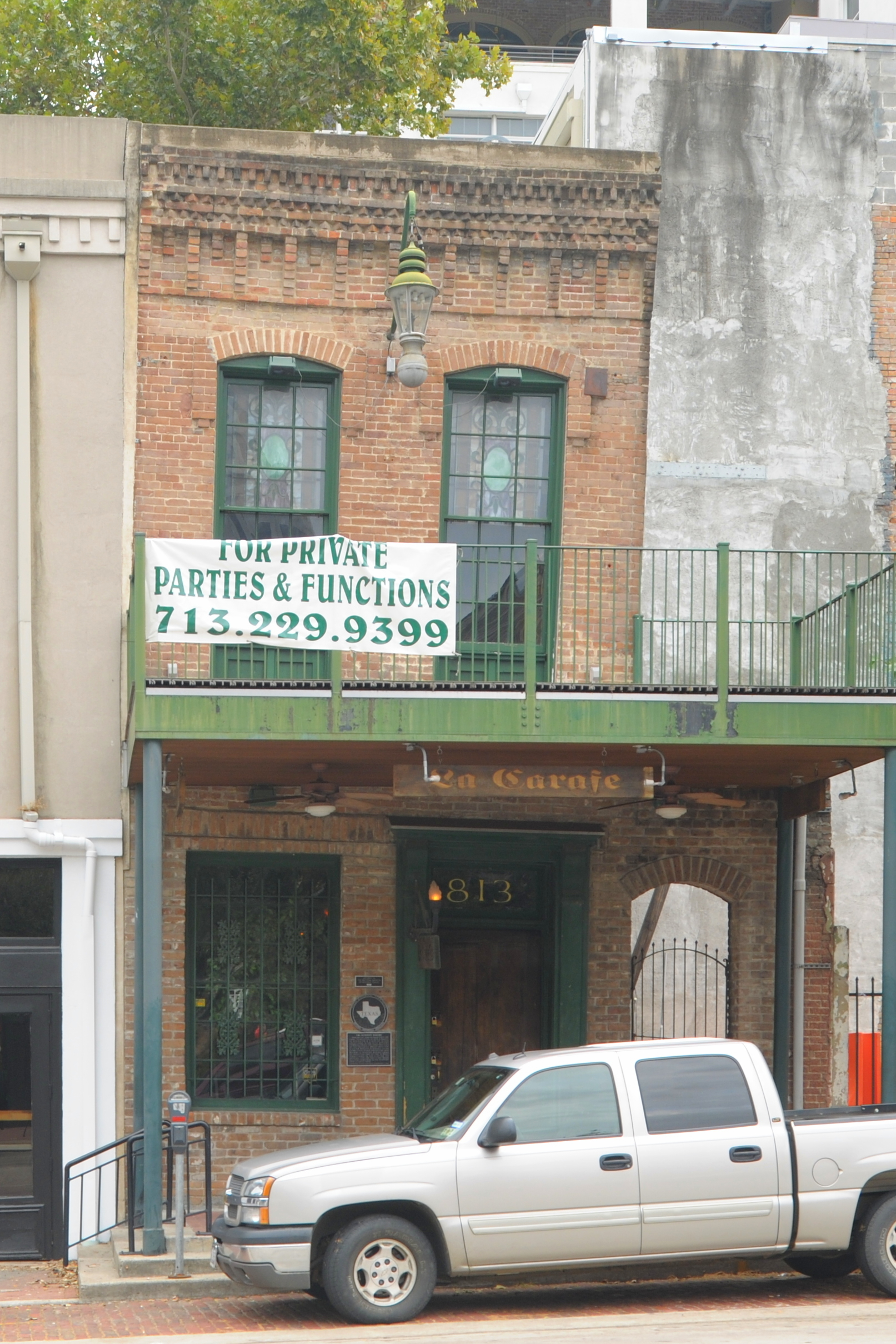
- The building's exterior in 2010

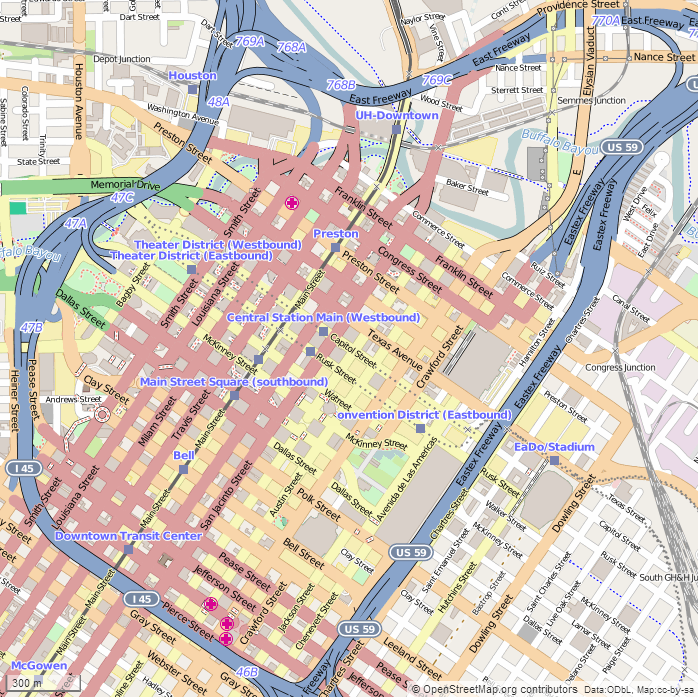
- Location within Houston Downtown Location within Texas Location within the United States
- Location: 813 Congress St., Houston, Texas
- Coordinates: 29°45′46″N 95°21′41″W
- Area: less than one acre
- Built: 1860
- NRHP reference No.: 79002963
- RTHL No.: 10712

Significant dates
- Added to NRHP: July 27, 1979
- Designated RTHL: 1981

Kennedy Bakery, located at 813 Congress Street in Houston, Texas, was listed on the National Register of Historic Places on July 27, 1979. The historic property in downtown Houston faces Market Square and lies within the Main Street Market Square Historic District. It is probably the "oldest Houston building existing on its original site."

== History ==
The Kennedy Bakery is named for John Kennedy, a baker born in Ireland. He resided in New Jersey and Missouri before immigrating to the Republic of Texas in 1842. He arrived in Houston with no savings, but opened his first bakery in the fall on Franklin Street. He accumulated and developed property at the corner of Congress and Travis streets, though he lost these buildings to a fire in August 1860. He did not hesitate in rebuilding; however, it is only conjecture that the Kennedy Bakery is this 1860 building.

Kennedy was already successful leading up to the American Civil War, converting his bakery to steam power, operating as a grocer, and establishing his own grist mill. He had already amassed thousands of acres of land within the Houston region in addition to his urban properties. He owned many slaves and offered material support to the Confederate States of America (CSA). He sold hard tack to the CSA Army and converted one of his buildings into an arsenal. After the war he divested of his rural land at great financial loss. By 1873, Kennedy's building operated as a drug store, and various druggists were tenants through 1932. It continued to operate as a retail location after 1932. In 1960, there were renovations to the structure and grillwork was added. Ownership remained within the Kennedy family until 1970, when it was sold to William V. Berry, who opened La Carafe. La Carafe was one of the oldest bars operating in Houston as of 2012.

== Building description ==
In 1979, the NRHP nomination form described the Kennedy Bakery as a two-story brick building with a first floor window of wooden sash broken into 24 light. The lot to its east was bordered by a five-foot alley, while abutting a retail building to the west. The façade had fifteen feet of frontage and its brick was a structural feature. Pilasters flanked the front entry, a single door under a "bracket-supported architrave." The upper windows were double-sashed with nine lights each. The alley led to an interior courtyard.

== See also ==
- National Register of Historic Places listings in Harris County, Texas
