= Turkey, Texas =

- City
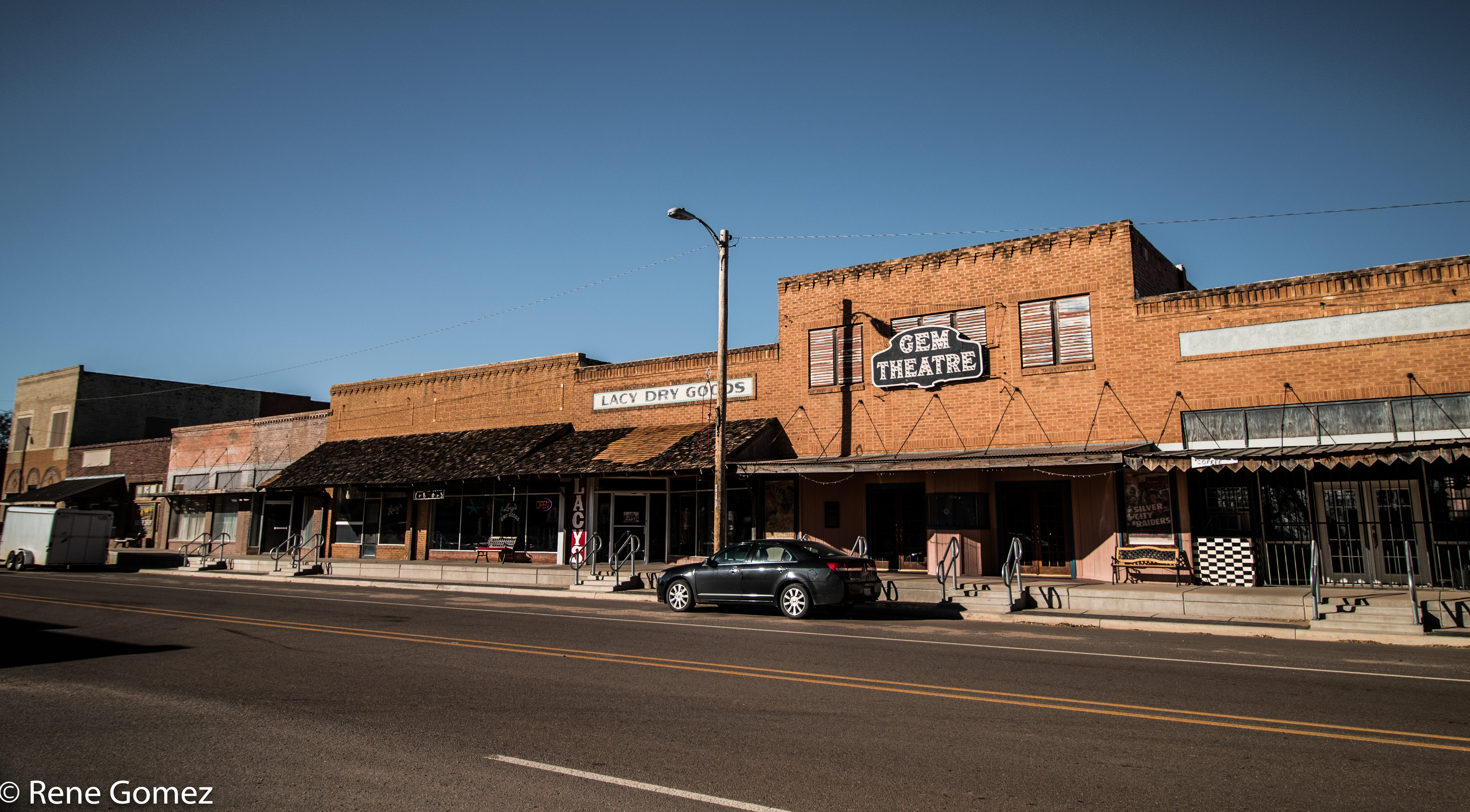

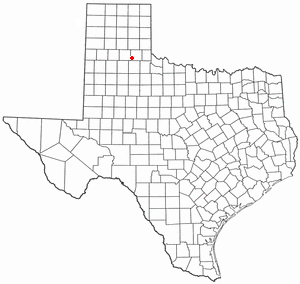
- Location of Turkey, Texas

- Location in Hall County (circled)
- Coordinates: 34°23′38″N 100°53′43″W
- Country: United States
- State: Texas
- County: Hall

Area
  - Total: 0.82 sq mi (2.12 km^{2})
  - Land: 0.82 sq mi (2.12 km^{2})
  - Water: 0 sq mi (0.00 km^{2})
- Elevation: 2,346 ft (715 m)

Population (2020)
  - Total: 317
  - Density: 387.3/sq mi (149.53/km^{2})
- Time zone: UTC-6 (Central (CST))
  - Summer (DST): UTC-5 (CDT)
- ZIP code: 79261
- Area code: 806
- FIPS code: 48-73964
- GNIS feature ID: 2412113
- Website: turkeytexas.net

Turkey is a city in Hall County, Texas, United States. The population was 317 at the 2020 census, down from 421 at the 2000 census.

== Geography ==
Turkey is located in southwestern Hall County. Texas State Highway 70 runs through the east side of the city as 9th Street, leading north 42 miles (68 km) to Clarendon and south 28 miles (45 km) to Matador. Texas State Highway 86 runs through the center of Turkey as Main Street, leading east 30 miles (48 km) to Estelline and west 53 miles (85 km) to Tulia.

According to the United States Census Bureau, Turkey has a total area of 0.81 square miles (2.1 km^{2}), all land.

Several of the state's largest ranches are near the town.

=== Climate ===
According to the Köppen climate classification system, Turkey has a semiarid climate, BSk on climate maps.

Climate data for Turkey, Texas (1991–2020 normals, extremes 1964–present)
Month	Jan	Feb	Mar	Apr	May	Jun	Jul	Aug	Sep	Oct	Nov	Dec	Year
Record high °F (°C)	85 (29)	96 (36)	100 (38)	109 (43)	107 (42)	116 (47)	117 (47)	112 (44)	108 (42)	106 (41)	92 (33)	87 (31)	117 (47)
Mean maximum °F (°C)	78.7 (25.9)	82.5 (28.1)	90.2 (32.3)	94.7 (34.8)	100.1 (37.8)	102.9 (39.4)	105.0 (40.6)	103.8 (39.9)	99.9 (37.7)	94.2 (34.6)	84.8 (29.3)	78.3 (25.7)	107.7 (42.1)
Mean daily maximum °F (°C)	55.4 (13.0)	59.2 (15.1)	67.8 (19.9)	76.4 (24.7)	83.8 (28.8)	91.5 (33.1)	95.5 (35.3)	94.7 (34.8)	86.8 (30.4)	76.9 (24.9)	65.5 (18.6)	55.9 (13.3)	75.8 (24.3)
Daily mean °F (°C)	41.3 (5.2)	44.7 (7.1)	52.9 (11.6)	61.3 (16.3)	70.1 (21.2)	78.6 (25.9)	82.5 (28.1)	81.4 (27.4)	73.6 (23.1)	62.5 (16.9)	51.3 (10.7)	42.5 (5.8)	61.9 (16.6)
Mean daily minimum °F (°C)	27.3 (−2.6)	30.3 (−0.9)	38.0 (3.3)	46.2 (7.9)	56.4 (13.6)	65.7 (18.7)	69.5 (20.8)	68.1 (20.1)	60.5 (15.8)	48.2 (9.0)	37.1 (2.8)	29.0 (−1.7)	48.0 (8.9)
Mean minimum °F (°C)	13.6 (−10.2)	15.7 (−9.1)	21.4 (−5.9)	30.3 (−0.9)	40.8 (4.9)	54.7 (12.6)	61.1 (16.2)	59.4 (15.2)	46.5 (8.1)	31.2 (−0.4)	19.9 (−6.7)	13.7 (−10.2)	8.4 (−13.1)
Record low °F (°C)	−1 (−18)	−2 (−19)	7 (−14)	22 (−6)	29 (−2)	45 (7)	53 (12)	50 (10)	35 (2)	18 (−8)	11 (−12)	−3 (−19)	−3 (−19)
Average precipitation inches (mm)	0.93 (24)	0.99 (25)	1.64 (42)	2.51 (64)	3.28 (83)	3.91 (99)	2.44 (62)	2.57 (65)	2.87 (73)	1.92 (49)	1.07 (27)	0.89 (23)	25.02 (636)
Average snowfall inches (cm)	2.0 (5.1)	1.6 (4.1)	0.7 (1.8)	0.1 (0.25)	0.0 (0.0)	0.0 (0.0)	0.0 (0.0)	0.0 (0.0)	0.0 (0.0)	0.1 (0.25)	0.7 (1.8)	1.5 (3.8)	6.7 (17)
Average precipitation days (≥ 0.01 in)	2.8	3.4	4.1	4.2	6.7	6.4	4.7	5.3	5.2	4.3	2.9	3.1	53.1
Average snowy days (≥ 0.1 in)	0.8	0.9	0.4	0.1	0.0	0.0	0.0	0.0	0.0	0.2	0.5	0.8	3.7
Source: NOAA

== History ==
The Bob Wills Festival, named in honor of western swing legend Bob Wills (who grew up in Turkey) has been held annually since 1972, featuring western swing and country music performances ranging from notable bands at the dance hall to impromptu jam sessions around town. The festival drew 10,000 people in 2022.

In November 2011, animal rights organization PETA petitioned the town to temporarily change its name to "Tofurky".

=== Notable buildings ===
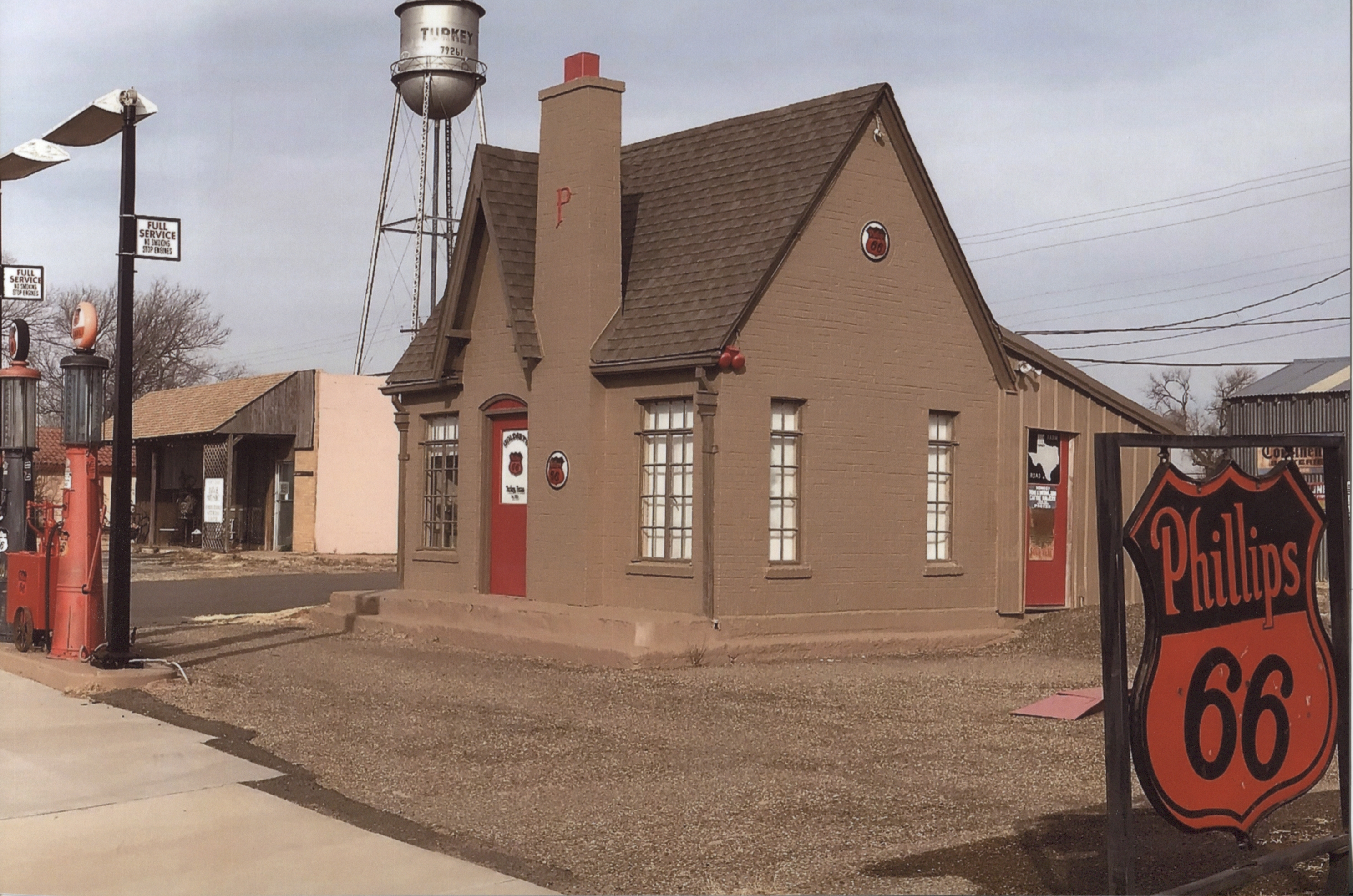
Restored 1928 Phillips 66 service station, the first Phillips 66 service station built in Texas

The first Phillips 66 service station built in Texas opened on July 27, 1928, on the corner of 5th Street and Main in Turkey, Texas. In January 2019, this service station was recognized by the Texas Historical Commission as a Recorded Texas Historic Landmark and a marker dedication ceremony to unveil the state historical marker was planned to take place at the service station in April 2020.

The Hotel Turkey opened in 1927. The building was added to the National Register of Historic Places on October 24, 1991. The hotel traditionally hosts the musicians who come to Turkey for the annual Bob Wills Festival held over several days centered on the last Saturday in April.

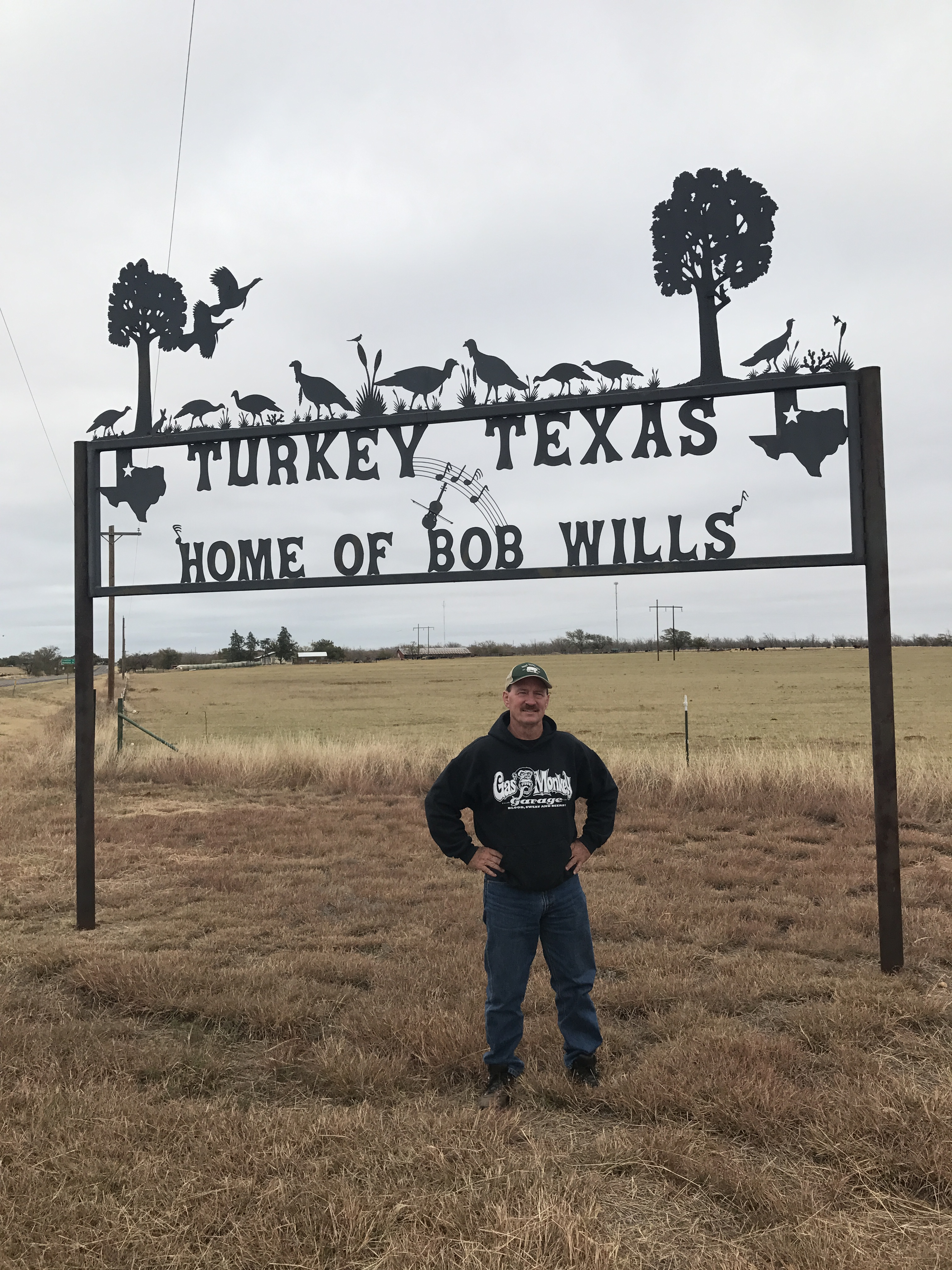
Turkey city limits

The Bob Wills Museum is located in Turkey, in the old elementary school.

A monument at the city limits of Turkey honors Wills.

== Demographics ==
Historical population
Census	Pop.	Note	%±
1930	975		—
1940	930		−4.6%
1950	1,005		8.1%
1960	813		−19.1%
1970	680		−16.4%
1980	644		−5.3%
1990	507		−21.3%
2000	494		−2.6%
2010	421		−14.8%
2020	317		−24.7%
U.S. Decennial Census

=== 2020 census ===
As of the 2020 census, Turkey had a population of 317 and a median age of 49.2 years. 19.2% of residents were under the age of 18 and 24.6% were 65 years of age or older. For every 100 females there were 98.1 males, and for every 100 females age 18 and over there were 95.4 males.

There were 144 households in Turkey, of which 24.3% had children under the age of 18 living in them. Of all households, 50.0% were married-couple households, 18.8% were households with a male householder and no spouse or partner present, and 27.8% were households with a female householder and no spouse or partner present. About 32.0% of all households were made up of individuals and 18.1% had someone living alone who was 65 years of age or older.

There were 233 housing units, of which 38.2% were vacant. The homeowner vacancy rate was 5.9% and the rental vacancy rate was 4.5%.

0.0% of residents lived in urban areas, while 100.0% lived in rural areas.

Racial composition as of the 2020 census
Race	Number	Percent
White	247	77.9%
Black or African American	6	1.9%
American Indian and Alaska Native	0	0.0%
Asian	0	0.0%
Native Hawaiian and Other Pacific Islander	0	0.0%
Some other race	40	12.6%
Two or more races	24	7.6%
Hispanic or Latino (of any race)	85	26.8%

=== 2000 census ===
As of the census of 2000, 494 people, 207 households, and 127 families resided in the city. The population density was 598.9 inhabitants per square mile (231.2/km^{2}). The 274 housing units averaged 332.2 per square mile (129.0/km^{2}). The racial makeup of the city was 71.86% European-American, 5.67% black, 0.40% Native American, 0.40% Asian, 21.26% from other races, and 0.40% from two or more races. Hispanics or Latinos of any race were 31.17% of the population.

Of the 207 households, 28.0% had children under the age of 18 living with them, 53.6% were married couples living together, 4.8% had a female householder with no husband present, and 38.6% were not families; 36.7% of all households were made up of individuals, and 22.7% had someone living alone who was 65 years of age or older. The average household size was 2.39 and the average family size was 3.20.

In the city, the population was distributed as 28.3% under the age of 18, 6.1% from 18 to 24, 21.9% from 25 to 44, 20.6% from 45 to 64, and 23.1% who were 65 years of age or older. The median age was 40 years. For every 100 females, there were 98.4 males. For every 100 females age 18 and over, there were 91.4 males.

The median income for a household in the city was $19,833, and for a family was $24,423. Males had a median income of $20,125 versus $21,250 for females. The per capita income for the city was $9,809. About 28.4% of families and 32.4% of the population were below the poverty line, including 42.5% of those under age 18 and 22.4% of those age 65 or over.

== Notable people ==
- Joe Barnhill, country music singer-songwriter
- Amarillo Slim, professional gambler
- Bob Wills, western swing founder, grew up in Turkey

== Education ==
The city is served by the Turkey-Quitaque Independent School District.

Hall County is in the service area of Clarendon College.
