= List of Recorded Texas Historic Landmarks (Grayson-Hudspeth) =

The following is a partial list of Recorded Texas Historic Landmarks (RTHLs) arranged by county as designated by the Texas Historical Commission and local county historical commissions in Texas. This page includes RTHLs in the following counties: Grayson, Gregg, Grimes, Guadalupe, Hale, Hall, Hamilton, Hansford, Hardeman, Hardin, Harris, Harrison, Hartley, Haskell, Hays, Hemphill, Henderson, Hidalgo, Hill, Hockley, Hood, Hopkins, Houston, Howard, and Hudspeth.

Recorded Texas Historic Landmarks listed by county
Anderson-Callahan • Cameron-Duval • Eastland-Gray • Grayson-Hudspeth • Hunt-Martin • Mason-Rusk • Sabine-Travis • Trinity-Zavala

KEY

Landmarks with multiple historic designations are colored according to their highest designation within the following hierarchy.

⁕ Listed individually on the National Register of Historic Places (NRHP) as a National Historic Landmark
⁂ Listed on the NRHP as a contributing property of a National Historic Landmark District
† Listed individually on the NRHP
‡ Listed as a contributing property of an NRHP Historic District
§ Listed individually as or as part of a State Historic Site
# Listed individually as or as part of a State Antiquities Landmark

== Grayson County ==
Registered Texas Historic Landmark	Image	Marker number	Physical address	Nearest city	Year designated	Location description
Barron–Veazey House		7337	104 W. Umphress St. 33°24′53″N 96°34′28″W	Van Alstyne	1990	104 Umphress at Preston
Bennett–Richardson House		7339	125 Center St. 33°39′27″N 96°54′20″W	Whitesboro	1992	125 Center St. at North St.
Birthplace of Dwight D. Eisenhower†§	More images	7359	609 S. Lamar Ave. 33°44′59″N 96°32′3″W	Denison	1962	Lamar at Day St.
Captain N. A. Birge House†	More images	7342	727 W. Birge St. 33°38′42″N 96°37′5″W	Sherman	1988	727 W. Birge at Woods St.
Carr–Taliaferro House		7345	516 N. Grand Ave. 33°38′41″N 96°35′40″W	Sherman	1978	
Cold Springs Log Cabin School	More images	7352	111 R.C. Vaughan Dr.	Denison	1977	Loy Lake Park / Frontier Town, west side of US 75
Davis–Ansley Log Cabin Home		7354	111 R.C. Vaughan Dr. 33°43′50″N 96°35′15″W	Denison	1976	Loylake Park / Frontier Village, west side of US 75
E. M. Kohl Building†‡	More images	7392	300 E. Main St. 33°45′17″N 96°31′54″W	Denison	1976	
Federal Building (United States Courthouse)†	More images	11908	101 E. Pecan St. 33°38′20″N 96°36′33″W	Sherman	1997	
First Presbyterian Church and Manse		7366	202 N. Blanton St. 33°30′51″N 96°23′43″W	Whitewright	1994	Blanton and Walnut St.
Friendship Methodist Church		7373	293 N. Friendship Rd. 33°38′3″N 96°39′46″W	Sherman	1967	from Sherman, take SH 56 west about 2 mi. to Friendship Rd., go north .7 mi. to church
Grayson College		7375	300 W. Cedar St. 33°31′2″N 96°23′43″W	Whitewright	1965	Grady St. between College and Cedar
Hall Furniture Building†		13166	118 W. Lamar St. 33°38′8″N 96°36′34″W	Sherman	2002	Sherman, 118 W. Lamar
J. K. Miller House		7407	1401 W. Walker St. 33°45′45″N 96°33′19″W	Denison	1972	1401 W. Walker St. at Brown St.
Jesse Elvis Hendricks Log Cabin		7384	111 R.C. Vaughan Dr. 33°43′50″N 96°35′13″W	Denison	1983	Loy Lake Park / Frontier Village, US 75
Kentuckytown Baptist Church		7390	264 Kentucky Town Rd. 33°31′24″N 96°26′17″W	Whitewright	1966	on Kentucky Town Road, .25 mi. north of SH 11, 3 mi. west of Whitewright
Lone Star Masonic Lodge No. 403, A. F. & A. M.‡		7396	115 S. Fannin Ave. 33°45′17″N 96°32′31″W	Denison	1985	115 S. Fannin Ave. at Chesnut
Martindale–Lackey–Hudgins House		16389	331 W. Grand St. 33°30′45″N 96°23′50″W	Whitewright	2010	Southeast corner of Chapman St and W. Grand Ave.
Masonic Temple 1924		7404	201 E. Lamar St. 33°38′10″N 96°36′28″W	Sherman	1988	201 E. Lamar St. at Walnut
Mayes House		16390	7 Ridgeway Cir. 33°45′0″N 96°33′33″W	Denison	2010	7 Ridgeway Circle
Metz House		7406	506 S. Crockett St. 33°37′56″N 96°36′35″W	Sherman	1976	
Odd Fellows Hall		7414	109 N. Walnut St. 33°38′14″N 96°36′29″W	Sherman	1965	109 N. Walnut at Houston St.
Old Bass Home		7338	111 R.C. Vaughan Dr. 33°43′54″N 96°35′20″W	Denison	1968	Loy Lake Park / Frontier Village, west side of US 75
Old Sherman Public Library†		11538	301 S. Walnut St. 33°38′5″N 96°36′24″W	Sherman	1986	
Old Thompson Home		11541	111 R.C. Vaughan Dr. 33°43′49″N 96°35′12″W	Denison	1968	at Loy Lake Park, Hwy 75 south and Loy Lake Road
Pioneer Cotton Seed Oil Mill		7419	1201 E. Pecan St. 33°38′30″N 96°35′48″W	Sherman	1967	1204 E. Pecan St.
Pool Manufacturing Company		7420	1601 S. Montgomery St. 33°37′12″N 96°36′4″W	Sherman	1967	
R. N. Younger Home		11564	200 Center St. 33°39′29″N 96°54′18″W	Whitesboro	1965	
Roberts House		11526	915 S. Crockett St. 33°37′39″N 96°36′28″W	Sherman	1993	915 S. Crockett St. at Spring St.
Samuel E. and Mary C. Marshall House		12751	318 W. Walnut St. 33°30′51″N 96°23′49″W	Whitewright	2001	318 W. Walnut St.
St. Luke's Church		11529	431 W. Woodard St. 33°45′25″N 96°32′29″W	Denison	1969	Fannin at Woodard St.
St. Mary's Catholic Church		12710	727 S. Travis St. 33°37′46″N 96°36′24″W	Sherman	2001	727 S. Travis
St. Patrick's Catholic Church		11531	314 N. Rusk Ave. 33°45′30″N 96°32′17″W	Denison	1983	
St. Patrick's Catholic Church		15233	314 N. Rusk Ave. 33°45′30″N 96°32′17″W	Denison	1983	
The Fitzgerald Home		7371	111 R.C. Vaughan Dr. 33°43′54″N 96°35′18″W	Denison	1969	Frontier Village
Thomas V. Munson Home		7411	530 W. Hanna St. 33°44′23″N 96°32′36″W	Denison	1967	530 W. Hanna St. at Mirick St.
Umphress–Taylor Home†		11546	161 E. Paris St. 33°24′57″N 96°34′24″W	Van Alstyne	1981	161 Paris at Preston
W. B. and Ella Munson Home		17519	1127 W. Morton St. 33°45′37″N 96°33′7″W	Denison	2013	Northeast corner of the intersection of West Morton Street and North Perry Avenue
Walnut Street Church of Christ		11549	315 S. Walnut St. 33°38′5″N 96°36′26″W	Sherman	1986	

== Gregg County ==
Registered Texas Historic Landmark	Image	Marker number	Physical address	Nearest city	Year designated	Location description
Brown-Birdsong House		9935	3406 Morrison St. 32°27′5″N 94°43′17″W	Longview	1965	Moved in May 2011 from 104 W. Whaley Street. Marker reported missing Oct. 2014.
Bumpus House		9936	116 W. Pacific Ave. 32°32′8″N 94°56′41″W	Gladewater	1994	House burned in 2014. Marker on display at Gladewater Museum.
Campbell "Honeymoon Home"		9938	500 N. Second St. 32°29′51″N 94°44′1″W	Longview	1963	500 N. Second St. at Magrill St.
Dean-Keener-Crim House		9943	101 E. Lantrip St. 32°23′25″N 94°52′22″W	Kilgore	1975	
Dr. E. L. and Nannie Lewis Walker House		13281	214 E. Commerce Ave. 32°32′0″N 94°56′37″W	Gladewater	2004	214 E Commerce
Dundee Angus Ranch Home, 1859		9945	3401 Dundee Rd. 32°32′49″N 94°48′4″W	Longview	1964	
Early Teague Home		10000	322 N. Teague St. 32°30′8″N 94°43′26″W	Longview	1966	
Everett Building†	More images	9948	214-216 N. Freedonia St. 32°29′43″N 94°44′19″W	Longview	1983	
F. L. Whaley House†	More images	10005	101 E. Whaley St. 32°29′51″N 94°44′18″W	Longview	1964	
Finch Family Home		9949	2024 E. Cotton St. 32°29′30″N 94°42′43″W	Longview	1967	
First Presbyterian Church		9954	815 E. Main St. 32°22′52″N 94°52′15″W	Kilgore	1989	Main and Lawrence St.
Harmon General Hospital Chapel		11918	Harris Dr. S of Stegall Dr, LeTourneau University 32°28′3″N 94°43′24″W	Longview	1997	SW of intersection of Stegall and Harris
Judge J. N. Campbell Home		9937	433 S. Center St. 32°29′21″N 94°44′36″W	Longview	1965	Marker in storage as of Oct. 2014.
Kilgore College Administration Building	More images	9968	1101 S. Henderson Blvd. 32°22′42″N 94°52′12″W	Kilgore	1990	
Kilgore National Bank Building		9971	118 S. Kilgore St. 32°23′8″N 94°52′34″W	Kilgore	1991	
Kilgore Public Library	More images	9972	301 N. Henderson Blvd. 32°23′0″N 94°52′10″W	Kilgore	1990	
Lewis-Bivins House		11678	208 E. College St. 32°29′27″N 94°44′22″W	Longview	1999	208 E. College St., Longview
Longview Community Center		9978	500 E. Whaley St. 32°29′45″N 94°44′0″W	Longview	1994	
Longview Municipal Building and Central Fire Station	More images	12759	100 E. Cotton St. 32°29′37″N 94°44′26″W	Longview	2001	100 E. Cotton St.
Longview Train Depot	More images	17982	905 Pacific Ave. 32°29′39″N 94°43′40″W	Longview	2014	Building is located on the north side of Pacific Avenue, just off Mobberly Avenue immediately south of the Mobberly railroad underpass. The marker will be located on the building, either in the open-air waiting area or at the main entrance on the south side.
Northcutt House†	More images	9985	313 S. Fredonia St. 32°29′29″N 94°44′27″W	Longview	1982	
Rembert-Harrison House†	More images	17733	316 S. Fredonia St. 32°29′28″N 94°44′24″W	Longview	2013	
Rock Springs Schoolhouse		9991	Old Kilgore Rd. N of Rock Springs Cemetery 32°29′56″N 94°58′18″W	Gladewater	1966	4.5 mi. south of Gladewater on Old Kilgore Rd. (Old 135) by Rock Springs Cemetery
St. Luke's United Methodist Church	More images	9995	401 E. Main St. 32°23′7″N 94°52′25″W	Kilgore	1986	
Turner Home		10001	503 E. Methvin St. 32°29′43″N 94°44′0″W	Longview	1964	

== Grimes County ==
Registered Texas Historic Landmark	Image	Marker number	Physical address	Nearest city	Year designated	Location description
Allen Home‡		14266	440 Fanthorp St. 30°29′5″N 95°59′4″W	Anderson	1965	
Anderson Baptist Church‡	More images	8562	379 S. Main St. 30°29′7″N 95°59′5″W	Anderson	1965	
B. B. Goodrich House‡	More images	8582	335 Fanthorp St. 30°29′10″N 95°59′4″W	Anderson	1963	200 block of Fanthorp St., Anderson.
Bennett, Rueben, House‡		14195		Anderson	1963	
Craig House		14833	508 Holland St. 30°23′17″N 96°5′5″W	Navasota	1977	
Evans House		8572	412 Manley St. 30°23′6″N 96°5′2″W	Navasota	1991	
First Presbyterian Church of Navasota		8577	302 Nolan St. 30°23′14″N 96°5′10″W	Navasota	1970	Corner of Nolan and Holland Streets; Navasota.
Foster Home		8578	1015 E. Washington Ave. 30°23′34″N 96°4′53″W	Navasota	1982	
Grimes County Courthouse‡#	More images	8585	100 S. Main St. 30°29′20″N 95°59′13″W	Anderson	1965	Courthouse, Anderson.
Henry Schumacher Home		8614	N end of Pierce Rd. 30°23′38″N 96°6′18″W	Navasota	1974	on private property - this house was moved to avoid demolition to a ranch owned by attorney John L. Pierce (NW of cemetery). *UTM coordinates are for new location of the structure.*
Isham Davis Home		8569	0.8 mi. W on CR 157 from CR 161 30°41′31″N 96°3′28″W	Iola	1965	From Iola take FM 244 S approximately 4.3 miles to CR 162 (Lake Grove Cemetery Rd.) then E on CR 162 approximately 2 miles to CR 157; then N on CR 157 approximately .8 miles (structure is on a hilltop approximately 200 yards from road).
James and Missouri Hurry House		8591	1 mi. N on CR 216 from FM 149 30°33′32″N 95°49′38″W	Richards	1992	from Richards, take FM 149 NE approx. 1 mi. to CR 216; then N on CR 216 approx. 1 mile.
Jesse Youens Home		8626	708 Holland St. 30°23′20″N 96°4′59″W	Navasota	1967	708 Holland Street, Navasota
Joseph Brooks Home		8566	612 E. Washington Ave. 30°23′24″N 96°5′5″W	Navasota	1981	
Leake Building‡		8597	211 E. Washington Ave. 30°23′18″N 96°5′20″W	Navasota	1978	211 E. Washington Avenue, Navasota.
Lee Tabernacle Methodist Church		8598	203 Teague St. 30°23′2″N 96°5′8″W	Navasota	1995	Corner of La Salle (Bus. SH 6) and Teague Street; Navasota.
Miss Sally Thompson School Building‡		8622	440 Fanthorp St. 30°29′5″N 95°59′4″W	Anderson	1965	440 Fanthorp Street, Anderson
Norwood House		8605	307 Ketchum St. 30°23′27″N 96°4′50″W	Navasota	1984	207 Ketchum, Navasota.
Oakland Baptist Church		8606	S end of Railroad Ave. 30°34′54″N 95°56′36″W	Roans Prairie	1967	from the intersection of SH 90 and SH 30 in Roans Prairie go E on SH 30 approx. 100 yards, then S on Church Road approx. 200 yards; Roans Prairie.
Old First National Bank of Navasota‡		8576	107 W. Washington Ave. 30°23′13″N 96°5′25″W	Navasota	1981	
Plantersville Baptist Church		8610	11555 Old Schoolhouse Rd. 30°19′55″N 95°51′41″W	Plantersville	1967	from the intersection of SH 105 and FM 1774 in Plantersville take FM 1774 south approximately .5 mile.
R. B. S. Foster Home†	More images	8579	7827 US 90 30°24′33″N 96°3′0″W	Navasota	1968	from the intersection of SH 6 and SH 90 (East Navasota) take SH 90 approximately 1.5 miles.
Robert A. Horlock House		8590	1215 E. Washington Ave. 30°23′38″N 96°4′47″W	Navasota	1984	1215 E. Washington Ave., Navasota.
Sangster House		8613	1113 E. Washington Ave. 30°23′36″N 96°4′50″W	Navasota	1974	1113 E. Washington Avenue, Navasota.
Site of Piedmont Springs Resort†		8609	11.2 mi. N on FM 3096 from SH 6 30°31′36″N 96°5′27″W	Navasota	1967	from the intersection of SH 6 and FM 3090 (Navasota) take FM 3096 north approx. 11.2 miles.
St. Mary's Catholic Church		12792	8227 CR 205 30°22′8″N 95°52′16″W	Plantersville	2001	8227 CR 205
Steele House†		9408	217 Brewer St. 30°23′20″N 96°5′3″W	Navasota	1974	at the NE corner of Holland St. and Brewer St.
Steinhagen Log Cabin‡		8617	201 Houston St. 30°29′12″N 95°59′15″W	Anderson	1965	Anderson Park on SH 90; Anderson
Templeman House		8620	1403 E. Washington Ave. 30°23′45″N 96°4′42″W	Navasota	1987	1403 E. Washington Ave., Navasota.
The Terrell House		8621	412 E. Washington Ave. 30°23′21″N 96°5′12″W	Navasota	1981	SE corner of Old Millican Road and E. Washington Avenue, Navasota.

== Guadalupe County ==
Registered Texas Historic Landmark	Image	Marker number	Physical address	Nearest city	Year designated	Location description
Andrew Herron Home	More images	43	906 W. Court St. 29°34′11″N 97°58′43″W	Seguin	1962	906 Mill Road, one mile west of Courthouse on Highway 90A West **BUILDING GONE**
Andrew Neill Church House		163	710 E. Court St. 29°34′10″N 97°57′28″W	Seguin	1971	700 block of East Court Street, Seguin. Moved or demolished.
Claiborne West Home		899	11 mi. E on U.S. 90A 29°33′28″N 97°47′44″W	Seguin	1962	from Seguin take US 90A East 11 miles - house is located on highway
Friedens Church		2062	2555 Friedens Church Rd. 29°40′10″N 98°0′10″W	Geronimo	1970	from Seguin, take SH 123 about 4.5 miles. Turn left on county road, continue about 2 miles. Turn right onto county road, continue approximately 1 mile to church.
George Francis Home (Dublin Plantation)†	More images	2152	3135 Cottonwood Creek Rd. 29°42′15″N 97°46′58″W	Kingsbury vicinity	1968	Private property near Cottonwood Creek Road.
Guadalupe High School		2299	507 S. Camp St. 29°33′56″N 97°57′54″W	Seguin	1962	300 block of South Austin Street, Seguin
Hard Scrabble	More images	5	513 E. Nolte St. 29°34′0″N 97°57′39″W	Seguin	1962	513 East Nolte (was Market) Street, Seguin
Hollamon House-Erskine House†	More images	15370	902 N. Austin St. 29°34′1″N 97°57′51″W	Seguin	1962	
Hugo and Georgia Gibson House		14010	308 S. Erkel Ave. 29°34′1″N 97°58′24″W	Seguin	2007	308 S. Erkel Ave.
Humphrey House†	More images	2596	902 N. Austin St. 29°34′1″N 97°57′51″W	Seguin	1962	902 North Austin Street, Seguin
Joseph Sonka House		2866	617 N. Guadalupe St. 29°34′27″N 97°58′10″W	Seguin	1990	617 North Guadalupe Street, Seguin.
Los Nogales†	More images	3128	415 S. River St. 29°33′57″N 97°57′47″W	Seguin	1989	
Moore House		3458	703 Johnson Ave. 29°33′51″N 97°58′21″W	Seguin	1981	703 Johnson Avenue, Seguin
Sebastopol†#	More images	4627	704 Zorn St. 29°34′12″N 97°58′21″W	Seguin	1991	704 Zorn Street, Seguin
St. Andrew's Episcopal Church		5026	201 E. Nolte St. 29°34′2″N 97°57′47″W	Seguin	1965	at intersection of Nolte and Crockett streets, Seguin
Sweet Home Vocational and Agricultural School†		12565	3340 Sweet Home Rd. 29°27′40″N 98°2′21″W	Seguin	2001	
Tewes House†		5236	8280 Linne Rd. 29°28′3″N 98°6′11″W	Marion	1996	280 Linne Road, Seguin (correct address: 8280 Linne Road, 9.5 miles south of Marion)
The Women's Club Rooms‡	More images	5455	432 N. River St. 29°34′20″N 97°57′51″W	Seguin	1962	432 River Street in Seguin

== Hale County ==
Registered Texas Historic Landmark	Image	Marker number	Physical address	Nearest city	Year designated	Location description
Blasingame Home		433	909 El Paso St. 34°11′25″N 101°42′35″W	Plainview	1982	
First Baptist Church of Plainview		1664	725 N. Austin St. 34°11′17″N 101°42′17″W	Plainview	1990	
Gates Hall		2112	701 N. Quincy St., Wayland Baptist University 34°11′12″N 101°43′33″W	Plainview	1965	Wayland Baptist College, Administration Building, SH 194, Plainview
Montgomery Ward Building‡		3445	113 W. Sixth St. 34°11′8″N 101°42′13″W	Plainview	1982	

== Hall County ==
Registered Texas Historic Landmark	Image	Marker number	Physical address	Nearest city	Year designated	Location description
First Presbyterian Church of Memphis		1843	801 Robertson St. 34°23′34″N 100°32′24″W	Memphis	1981	8th & Robertson Streets, Memphis
Hall County Courthouse†#		2337	512 W. Main St. 34°43′31″N 100°32′6″W	Memphis	2008	512 W. Main St
Hotel Turkey†		2575	201 3rd St. 34°23′38″N 100°53′51″W	Turkey	1985	Intersecting of 3rd & Alexander Streets, Turkey; inside door of hotel
Shoe Bar Ranch Headquarters		4688	N of CR D near Lakeview 34°42′16″N 100°41′24″W	Memphis	1962	12 miles west of Memphis, off S.H. 256 - NOT LOCATED.
Turkey High School		5569	700 Lyles St. 34°23′26″N 100°53′35″W	Turkey	1986	on Lyles Street, one block west of S.H. 70, next to City Hall

== Hamilton County ==
Registered Texas Historic Landmark	Image	Marker number	Physical address	Nearest city	Year designated	Location description
Cole House		938	105 W. North St. 31°59′18″N 98°2′0″W	Hico	1988	105 West North Street, Hico
Durham Ranch House		1304	CR 223 at CR 222 31°45′2″N 98°2′9″W	Hamilton	1962	from Hamilton, take 281 north 1/2 mile from Town Square, go east on FM 2905 5.9 miles, go south on CR 9/10 mile to house on east side of road with stone gate entrance
Francis Marion Graves Home		2258	201 W. Ross St. 31°42′25″N 98°7′28″W	Hamilton	1963	201 West Ross Street, Hamilton
Hamilton County Courthouse†#	More images	2347	102 N. Rice St. 31°42′13″N 98°7′23″W	Hamilton	1967	Courthouse lawn, Hamilton (JCT of U.S. 281 and SH 36)
Hamilton National Bank		2350	101 E. Henry St. 31°42′18″N 98°7′25″W	Hamilton	1966	Northwest corner of Town Square (Courthouse Square)(corner of US 281 and East Henry), Hamilton
J. G. Barbee House		302	S end CR 245 31°57′16″N 97°58′55″W	Hico	1963	from Hico take Highway 6 east 8/10 miles turn south on first CR after Hico cemetery; proceed 1 7/10 miles south on CR, turn west on B sign onto CR 240, proceed 1 mile to house.
Knights of Pythias Lodge Hall		2968	110 W. Main St. 31°42′13″N 98°7′29″W	Hamilton	1987	110 West Main Street, Hamilton
Manning-Gordon-Henderson House		11925	121 S. Rice St. 31°42′11″N 98°7′29″W	Hamilton	1999	
Presbyterian Church		4113	600 N. Rice St. 31°42′31″N 98°7′18″W	Hamilton	1967	600 North Rice Avenue (US 281 at Whitney)
Rock House Masonic Lodge		4318	2.2 mi. S on CR 301 from SH 22 31°42′7″N 98°0′46″W	Hamilton	1963	from Hamilton Eastern city limits take SH 22 east about 3.5 miles, turn south on CR 301 and proceed about 2.2 miles to site
Saint Mary's Episcopal Church		6375	120 W. Main St. 31°42′14″N 98°7′30″W	Hamilton	1966	120 West Main Street, Hamilton
St. Paul's Lutheran Church		5074	1.5 mi. S on FM 3340 from FM 932 31°37′17″N 98°3′23″W	Hamilton	1989	from Hamilton, 7 miles southeast on FM 932 towards Aleman, then 1.5 miles south on FM 3340.
Twin Oaks		5582	222 E. Baker St. 31°41′35″N 98°7′34″W	Hamilton	1968	end of Baker Street at Campbell Lane (in front of house), Hamilton 222 Baker Street (off US 281), Hamilton

== Hansford County ==
Registered Texas Historic Landmark	Image	Marker number	Physical address	Nearest city	Year designated	Location description
Brandt Building		489	201 Main St. 36°11′59″N 101°11′40″W	Spearman	1980	
Hansford Cemetery		2365	SH 15/SH 207 6 miles (9.7 km) W of Spearman 36°11′55″N 101°17′44″W	Spearman	1967	from Spearman take SH 15/207 about 6 miles to cemetery
Santa Fe Railroad Stationmaster's House		4581	30 S. Townsend St. 36°11′50″N 101°11′51″W	Spearman	1978	
Spearman Hotel		5005	502 Davis St. 36°12′1″N 101°11′33″W	Spearman	1967	Demolished

== Hardeman County ==
Registered Texas Historic Landmark	Image	Marker number	Physical address	Nearest city	Year designated	Location description
Chillicothe First Methodist Church		11926	301 Ave. J 34°15′18″N 99°30′52″W	Chillicothe	1998	
First Presbyterian Church of Quanah‡		1845	409 S. Main St. 34°17′45″N 99°44′24″W	Quanah	1994	409 South Main Street, Suite 6 -Quanah
Hardeman County Courthouse‡#	More images	12782	300 S. Main St. 34°17′50″N 99°44′25″W	Quanah	2001	300 block of Main St.
Hardeman County Jail‡		2371	105 Green St. 34°17′59″N 99°44′28″W	Quanah	1977	Green Street
Medicine Mound Depot, 1910		3312	1802 E. 11th St. 34°17′8″N 99°43′20″W	Quanah	1964	Highway 287, Quanah at intersection of Highway 282 (SH 6) & Highway 297-Quanah
Railroad Depot, Old†‡		14376	100 Mercer St. 34°17′14″N 99°44′52″W	Quanah	1964	
Simpson Building‡		12594	222 S. Main St. 34°17′53″N 99°44′24″W	Quanah	2001	
Trinity Church of Quanah		5558	500 DuBose St. 34°17′47″N 99°44′37″W	Quanah	1976	500 DuBose Street, Quanah

== Hardin County ==
Registered Texas Historic Landmark	Image	Marker number	Physical address	Nearest city	Year designated	Location description
Kirby-Hill House†		11933	210 W. Main St. 30°22′12″N 94°18′55″W	Kountze	1998	
Silsbee Ice Plant		11166	818 Ernest Ave. 30°20′55″N 94°10′38″W	Silsbee	1991	Corner of Ernest and S 4th St., Silsbee

== Harris County ==
Registered Texas Historic Landmark	Image	Marker number	Physical address	Nearest city	Year designated	Location description
Forum of Civics		10667	2503 Westheimer	Houston	1964	Westheimer at Kirby
Old Dyer House, 1890			11510 S. Garden	Missouri City	1966	
Nichols-Rice-Cherry House				Houston	1967	400 block McKinney, Sam Houston Heritage Park
St. Peter Church			9022 Long Point Rd.	Houston	1967	9022 Long Point Rd. at S. Campbell
San Felipe Cottage			515 Allen Parkway	Houston	1967	in Heritage Park
Pillot House				Houston	1967	Sam Houston Heritage Park, 400 block McKinney
Kellum-Noble House			212 Dallas Street	Houston	1967	The Heritage Society at Sam Houston Park
Annunciation Church				Houston	1969	600 block of Crawford & Texas
Griffin Memorial House				Tomball	1969	400 block of Pine St.
Cedar Bayou Masonic Lodge No. 321, A. F. & A. M.			2850 Ferry Road	Baytown	1970	
Hall of Cedar Bayou Masonic Lodge No. 321, A. F. & A. M.			2850 Ferry Rd.	Baytown	1970	
Sweeney, Coombs, and Fredericks Building			301 Main St.	Houston	1974	
Houston Cotton Exchange and Board of Trade			202 Travis St.	Houston	1974	202 Travis St. at Franklin
W. L. Foley Building			214-18 Travis Street	Houston	1978	
McGhee Elementary School Building				Channelview	1979	Crockett and 1st St., behind de Zavala Elementary School
John Milroy House			1102 Heights Blvd.	Houston	1979	
Heritage Presbyterian Church			7934 SH 6	Houston	1980	7 mi. N. of IH-10W
Hogg Building			401 Louisiana St.	Houston	1981	
Kennedy Bakery			813 Congress	Houston	1981	
Rose Hill Methodist Church Building			21014 Rose Hill Church Rd.	Tomball	1982	off FM 2920 about 5 mi. west of Tomball in the Rose Hill community
The Sheridan Apartments			802-804 McGowen St.	Houston	1984	
Wunsche Bros. Saloon and Hotel			103 Midway	Spring	1984	next to railroad tracks
Merchants and Manufacturers Building			1 Main St.	Houston	1984	U. of Houston Downtown
Ezekial and Mary Jane Miller House			304 Hawthorne	Houston	1984	
Auditorium Hotel			710 Texas Avenue	Houston	1984	
DePelchin Faith Home			2700 Albany at Drew	Houston	1984	
Arthur B. Cohn House			1711 Rusk	Houston	1985	
Trinity Episcopal Church			3404 S. Main	Houston	1986	
Rose Hill United Methodist Church			21014 Rose Hill Church Rd.	Tomball	1987	of FM 2920 about 5 mi. west of Tomball in the Rose Hill community
St. Nicholas Catholic Church			2508 Clay St.	Houston	1987	
Houston Fire Station No. 7			2403 Milam St.	Houston	1988	
Clayton House			5300 Caroline	Houston	1988	
Baytown Post Office			220 W. Defee	Baytown	1988	
Saint Joseph's Catholic Church				Houston	1989	
Fondren Mansion			3410 Montrose Blvd.	Houston	1989	
Holcombe House			1905 Holcombe Blvd.	Houston	1991	east of medical center now called "The Hospice"
David Barker House			121 E. 16th St.	Houston	1991	
Houston Light Guard Armory			3816 Caroline	Houston	1991	
Wade and Mamie Irvin House			431 Bayridge Rd.	Morgan's Point	1991	
Baker-Jones House			22 Courtlandt Place	Houston	1991	
K'Nesseth Israel Synagogue				Baytown	1991	Commerce and Sterling St.
John M. Dorrance House			9 Courtlandt Place	Houston	1991	
West Mansion			3301 NASA Rd. 1	Webster	1993	Razed Nov. 2019
Autry House, Rice University			6265 Main St.	Houston	1994	
Antioch Missionary Baptist Church			600 Clay Street	Houston	1994	
Thomas J. and Mary Donoghue House			17 Courtlandt Place	Houston	1994	
Moore Log House			440 Wilchester Blvd.	Houston	1996	House/marker is in Edith L. Moore Nature Sanctuary, approx. three tenths mile west of Sam Houston Toll way; park entrance via United Methodist Church parking lot off of Memorial Drive; fence on west parking lot boundary marks sanctuary, gate mid-way along
J. W. Garrow House			19 Courtlandt Place	Houston	1997	
James Judson and Lena Carter Carroll House			16 Courtlandt Place	Houston	1997	
Pioneer Memorial Log House			1510 N. MacGregor	Houston	1997	Hermann Park
Rutherford B. H. Yates Sr. House			1314 Andrews St.	Houston	1998	
Bryan-Chapman House			15 Courtlandt Place	Houston	1998	
Ned A. & Linda S. Eppes House			5322 Institute Lane	Houston	1998	
Dr. Penn B. and Annie A. Thornton House			327 W. 16th St.	Houston	1998	
Minchen House			1753 North Blvd.	Houston	1999	
Sessums & Virginia Cleveland House			8 Courtlandt Place	Houston	1999	
Third Church of Christ, Scientist			5516 Almeda Rd.	Houston	1999	
Houston Heights City Hall and Fire Station			107 W. 12th St.	Houston	2001	107 W. 12th St.
Link–Lee House			3800 Montrose Blvd.	Houston	2001	
Harper House			319 Hawthorne St.	Houston	2001	
Benjamin Apartments			1218 Webster St.	Houston	2001	
Anderson House			3925 Del Monte	Houston	2001	
First Evangelical Church			1300 Holman	Houston	2002	1300 Holman
Blue Triangle Branch, Y. W. C. A. Building			3005 McGowen	Houston	2002	3005 McGowen
F.C.L. and Emilie Neuhaus House			6 Courtlandt Place	Houston	2002	#6 Courtlandt Place, Houston
Julia Ideson Building		13888	500 McKinney	Houston	2003	
Magnolia Brewery Building			715 Franklin	Houston	2003	715 Franklin
Hugo Victor Neuhaus Jr. House			2910 Lazy Ln	Houston	2005	
Angelo and Lillian Minella House			6328 Brookside Dr	Houston	2006	6328 Brookside Dr
Kleb Family House				Tomball	2006	south of Draper Road and west of Mueschke Road
Gulf Building			712 Main and 711 Travis	Houston	2007	712 Main and 711 Travis
Matthews-Johnson House			1835 Cortlandt St	Houston	2008	
Farnsworth & Chambers Building			2999 South Wayside Drive	Houston	2009	
Magnolia Park City Hall and Central Fire Station			7301 Avenue F	Houston	2009	7301 Avenue F
Harris County 1910 Courthouse			301 Fannin	Houston	2010	
James L. Autry House			5 Courtlandt Place	Houston	2010	Houston, 5 Courtlandt Place
Jones-Hunt House			24 Courtlandt Place	Houston	2010	
Hidalgo Park Quiosco			7000 Ave. Q	Houston	2010	
John and Bessie Parker House			2 Courtlandt Place	Houston	2011	
Myer-Hall House			4 Courtlandt Place	Houston	2011	
W. T. Carter Jr. House			18 Courtlandt Place	Houston	2011	
Robert E. Lee High School			1809 Market Street	Baytown	2011	Baytown, 1809 Market Street
Sylvan Beach Pavilion			554 North Bayshore	La Porte	2011	La Porte, 554 North Bayshore
Underwood and Clara Nazro House			25 Courtlandt Place	Houston	2012	Houston, 25 Courtlandt Place
Gov. John B. Connally Jr. Home			2411 River Oaks Blvd.	Houston	2012	3 miles from central business district
Dr. John H. Foster House			320 Branard Street	Houston	2012	northeast corner of Branard and Bute
Isaiah P. Walker House			3534 Miramar Dr	Shoreacres	2012	LT 7 & LT 10 & N 20 FT OF LT 11 & E 40 FT OF LT 16 & TR 7A BLK 10 SHOREACRES
A. M. Armand House			110 Stratford	Houston	2013	
W. T. Carter, Sr. House			14 Courtlandt Place	Houston	2014	14 Courtlandt Place
Edwin and Daphne Neville House			11 Courtlandt Place	Houston	2014	11 Courtlandt Place, Houston

== Harrison County ==
Registered Texas Historic Landmark	Image	Marker number	Physical address	Nearest city	Year designated	Location description
Adams House		10134	1502 S. Washington Ave. 32°31′54″N 94°22′3″W	Marshall	1979	
Albert & Katie Van Hook House		11978	303 S. Washington Ave. 32°32′35″N 94°22′3″W	Marshall	1999	
Arnot House†	More images	10138	306 W. Houston St. 32°32′41″N 94°22′10″W	Marshall	1980	
Dr. Samuel Floyd Vaughan Home		10224	1.5 mi. N on FM 134 32°31′4″N 94°7′6″W	Jonesville	1985	on FM 134 about 1.5 mi. N of Jonesville
Ebenezer Methodist Church		10153	908 Whetstone St. 32°32′37″N 94°22′35″W	Marshall	1967	
Edgemont†		10155	4448 FM 3379 32°31′58″N 94°25′10″W	Marshall	1981	Old Longview Rd, 3 mi W of Marshall
Elks Building		18717	212 N. Washington Ave. 32°32′47″N 94°22′1″W	Marshall	2017	
First Methodist Church†	More images	10157	300 E. Houston St. 32°32′42″N 94°21′55″W	Marshall	1965	
First Presbyterian Church		10158	310 N. Fulton St. 32°32′50″N 94°22′12″W	Marshall	1963	corner of N Fulton at W Burleson
Fraley-Garland House		10161	700 E. Rusk St. 32°32′48″N 94°21′39″W	Marshall	1986	
Fry-Barry House†	More images	10162	314 W. Austin St. 32°32′44″N 94°22′11″W	Marshall	1962	
Ginocchio-Cook-Pedison House‡	More images	10163	615 N. Washington Ave. 32°33′3″N 94°22′4″W	Marshall	1973	
Ginocchio Hotel and Restaurant‡	More images	10164	705 N. Washington Ave. 32°33′5″N 94°22′3″W	Marshall	1971	
Hagerty-Harris House†	More images	10169	505 E. Rusk St. 32°32′49″N 94°21′43″W	Marshall	1977	
Harrison County Courthouse†#	More images	10177	1 Peter Whetstone Sq. 32°32′41″N 94°22′1″W	Marshall	1965	
Home of William Thomas Scott		10212	FM 1998 at CR 2123 32°32′30″N 94°14′13″W	Scottsville	1963	
John Barry Henderson Home	More images	10179	6265 N. U.S. 59 32°37′6″N 94°20′13″W	Marshall	1965	about 5 miles N of Marshall on US 59
Judge J. B. Williamson House†		10230	411 FM 449 32°33′4″N 94°25′19″W	Marshall	1964	
Key Log Cabin		15034	301 Henley Perry Dr. 32°32′14″N 94°21′56″W	Marshall	1965	
LaGrone's Chapel		10183	CR 3600 at FM 2208 32°34′15″N 94°39′10″W	Hallsville	1973	Noonday Rd, 8 mi. N of Hallsville
Magnolia Hall†	More images	10205	303 N. Columbus St. 32°32′49″N 94°21′53″W	Marshall	1968	
Marshall Hall	More images	17692	East Texas Baptist University, 1 Tiger Dr. 32°33′21″N 94°22′25″W	Marshall	2013	
Pierce House†	More images	15076	303 N. Columbus St. 32°32′49″N 94°21′53″W	Marshall	1968	
Starr Family Home†§#	More images	10187	407 W. Travis St. 32°32′31″N 94°22′13″W	Marshall	1986	
Texas & Pacific Depot‡	More images	10219	800 N. Washington Ave. 32°33′7″N 94°22′3″W	Marshall	1985	
The Allen House‡	More images	10135	610 N. Washington Ave. 32°33′2″N 94°22′2″W	Marshall	1977	
The Belle Fry Gaines House†	More images	10139	313 W. Austin St. 32°32′45″N 94°22′12″W	Marshall	1978	
The Gregg-Furrh-Elder House		10167	407 W. Rusk St. 32°32′49″N 94°22′15″W	Marshall	1973	
The Hochwald House†	More images	10180	211 W. Grand Ave. 32°32′55″N 94°22′6″W	Marshall	1979	
The Turner House†	More images	10222	406 S. Washington Ave. 32°32′31″N 94°22′1″W	Marshall	1979	
Todd-McKay-Wheat House		12802	506 W. Burleson St. 32°32′51″N 94°22′20″W	Marshall	2002	506 W. Burleson
Trammel's Trace Cabin		10220	301 Henley Perry Dr. 32°32′14″N 94°21′56″W	Marshall	1965	
Ware Home		10225	E of Blocker Rd. N of FM 2625 32°26′59″N 94°17′6″W	Marshall	1963	on Old Blocker Rd., off SH 31 (about 2.5 mi. W), about 9 mi. SE of Marshall
Weisman-Hirsch House†	More images	10226	313 S. Washington Ave. 32°32′33″N 94°22′3″W	Marshall	1979	
Whetstone-Lancaster House	More images	15998	302 E. Travis St. 32°32′29″N 94°21′54″W	Marshall	2009	
Wigfall House		10228	510 W. Burleson St. 32°32′50″N 94°22′21″W	Marshall	1979	
William Bates Anderson Home		10137	691 FM 968 32°31′12″N 94°26′44″W	Marshall	1963	8 mi. W off US 80 on Gum Springs Rd.
William Patillo House‡		10202	510 N. Bolivar St. 32°32′58″N 94°21′58″W	Marshall	1965	
Woodley House		10233	2063 Woodley Rd. 32°23′58″N 94°13′29″W	Marshall	1988	12 mi. SE of Marshall on SH 31, then 2 mi. W on Woodley Rd. (CR 1313)

== Hartley County ==
Registered Texas Historic Landmark	Image	Marker number	Physical address	Nearest city	Year designated	Location description
Channing United Methodist Church		11980	719 Denver Ave. 35°41′1″N 102°19′59″W	Channing	1964	corner Denver & 8th Street, Channing
First Hartley County Jail		1727	10th Street 35°52′49″N 102°24′1″W	Hartley	1966	10th Street, near public school -Hartley
Hartley County Courthouse†#		2400	900 Main St. 35°40′54″N 102°19′57″W	Channing	1987	corner 9th & Railroad, Channing
XIT General Office†	More images	5916	517 Railroad Ave 35°41′9″N 102°19′52″W	Channing	1994	517 Railroad Avenue, Channing
XIT Ranch Headquarters†	More images	14556	517 Railroad Ave. 35°41′9″N 102°19′52″W	Channing	1964	

== Haskell County ==
Registered Texas Historic Landmark	Image	Marker number	Physical address	Nearest city	Year designated	Location description
J. U. Fields Home		2664	401 N. Ave. E 33°9′40″N 99°44′3″W	Haskell	1963	
Old Railroad Depot		3787	Bus. US 277 S of Haskell 33°8′24″N 99°44′10″W	Haskell	1968	S city limits, Haskell

== Hays County ==
Registered Texas Historic Landmark	Image	Marker number	Physical address	Nearest city	Year designated	Location description
Alexander Gates & Lillian Johnson Thomas House‡		11985	809 Belvin St. 29°52′47″N 97°57′2″W	San Marcos	1997	
Augusta Hofheinz House†		10282	1104 W. Hopkins St. 29°52′35″N 97°57′10″W	San Marcos	1992	
Basil Dailey House		10255	411 W. San Antonio St. 29°52′52″N 97°56′40″W	San Marcos	1963	
Beverly Hutchison House†		10283	400 N. Lyndon B. Johnson Dr. 29°53′8″N 97°56′25″W	San Marcos	1968	
Blanco Chapel		10238	3 mi. W on Cypress Rd. 29°59′26″N 97°55′11″W	Kyle	1965	About three miles west of Kyle off Lime Kiln Road (CR 225). On private land.
Buda Christian Church	More images	10241	200 N. San Marcos St. 30°4′58″N 97°50′41″W	Buda	1986	
Bunton Branch Bridge†#		17342	CR 210 over Bunton Branch 30°1′5″N 97°51′31″W	Kyle	2012	.2 miles northwest of IH 35
Burleson Home†		10244	1200 Lime Kiln Rd. 29°54′43″N 97°55′43″W	San Marcos	1965	from Old Post Rd., take Lime Kiln Rd. north approx. 1.5 mi. to private entrance
Burleson Homestead		10245	Ed J.L. Green Dr. in the Meadows Center for Water and the Environment 29°53′41″N 97°55′49″W	San Marcos	1967	Texas State University, Meadows Center for Water and the Environment, access to site by permission only
Caldwell-Kone-Hyatt House		10247	618 W. Hutchison St. 29°52′52″N 97°56′57″W	San Marcos	1975	
Carpenter Log Home		10250	3840 RM 967 30°6′0″N 97°53′10″W	Buda	1977	from Buda take RR 967 west approx 4 miles to private gate entrance (cabin on private property)
Cemetery Chapel†		10321	Chapel Way at Evening Star Dr. in San Marcos City Cemetery 29°53′12″N 97°57′27″W	San Marcos	1973	from Courthouse take RR 12 approx. 1.2 miles north (chapel near center rear section of San Marcos Cemetery)
Charles Cock Home†#		10252	400 E. Hopkins St. 29°53′0″N 97°56′14″W	San Marcos	1968	
Claiborne Kyle Log House†#		10291	W end, Claiborne-Kyle House Rd. 29°57′55″N 97°54′8″W	Kyle	1982	from Kyle take Old Stagecoach Rd. SW approx. 4 miles
Cora Jackman Donalson House†	More images	15989	200 S. Sledge St. 29°59′18″N 97°52′47″W	Kyle	2009	
Cumberland Presbyterian Church (Fort Street Presbyterian Church)†		12730	516 W. Hopkins St. 29°52′55″N 97°56′48″W	San Marcos	2001	516 W. Hopkins
Czichos House		10254	Wayside Dr. 29°59′10″N 98°6′38″W	Wimberley	1965	in Pioneer Town Resort; in Wimberley take River Road 1 mi. west of RR 12
Danforth-Kerbow House		23632	220 Old Kyle Rd. 29°59′48″N 98°5′40.5″W	Wimberley	2022	Marker pending
Dripping Springs Academy‡	More images	10261	103 Old Fitzhugh Rd. 30°11′36″N 98°5′23″W	Dripping Springs	1968	on Old Fitzhugo Rd. approx. 1 block north of Mercer St.
Eli T. Merriman Home		10302	N. C.M. Allen Pkwy. in Veramendi Plaza 29°52′59″N 97°56′14″W	San Marcos	1965	in Aquarena Springs Park, Texana Village
Ezekiel Nance Home		10306	2.5 mi. W on Nance Mill Rd.	Kyle	1965	according to CHC, this marker is located: 2.5 miles west of Kyle on Nance Mill Rd. Home is not standing but site has remnants.
Farmers Union Gin Company†		10264	120 W. Grove St. 29°52′33″N 97°56′25″W	San Marcos	1981	at the corner of Grove and Hill St.
First United Methodist Church†	More images	10271	129 W. Hutchison St. 29°53′2″N 97°56′34″W	San Marcos	1970	
Fisher Hall†		15508	1132 Belvin St. 29°52′35″N 97°57′16″W	San Marcos	1970	Destroyed by an arson fire in April 2007
George Henry Talmadge Home‡		10330	802 Belvin St. 29°52′48″N 97°57′4″W	San Marcos	1978	
George Thomas McGehee House‡		10295	727 Belvin St. 29°52′48″N 97°57′0″W	San Marcos	1975	
Goforth-Harris House†		14892	401 N. Comanche St. 29°53′6″N 97°56′40″W	San Marcos	2008	
Heard-Baker House†		10281	620 W. San Antonio St. 29°52′46″N 97°56′48″W	San Marcos	1986	
Ike Wood House‡		10339	227 N. Mitchell Ave. 29°52′40″N 97°57′9″W	San Marcos	1978	
J. H. and Abbie Barbee House		18012	220 N. Johnson Ave. 29°52′38″N 97°57′11″W	San Marcos	2014	220 N Johnson at the corner of Belvin
James C. Lane House†		16422	306 Wimberley Sq. 29°59′43″N 98°5′51″W	Wimberley	2010	
James Lafayette and Eliza Pitts Malone House		10299	1236 Belvin St. 29°52′32″N 97°57′21″W	San Marcos	1996	
John F. McGehee Home‡		10296	832 Belvin St. 29°52′45″N 97°57′7″W	San Marcos	1973	
John Matthew Cape House†		10249	316 W. Hopkins St. 29°52′59″N 97°56′40″W	San Marcos	1985	
John R. Dobie House†		10257	282 Old Kyle Rd. 29°59′48″N 98°5′34″W	Wimberley	1990	approx. 150 yds. north of town square on Old Kyle Rd.
Joseph B. Rogers House		10317	4 mi. E on RM 967 30°7′1″N 97°58′30″W	Driftwood	1975	take RR 967 E approx. 4 miles
Joseph W. Earnest Home‡		10263	833 Belvin St. 29°52′44″N 97°57′5″W	San Marcos	1979	
Julia Ann Ragsdale Home		10315	306 E. Summit Dr. 30°0′40″N 98°5′46″W	Wimberley	1976	take RR 12 N to Summit Dr.; then east on Summit Dr. approx. .5 miles to Gumbert Ranch (private property)
Kone-Cliett House†		10286	724 Burleson St. 29°52′52″N 97°57′5″W	San Marcos	1986	
Kone-Yarbrough House‡		10287	903 Belvin St. 29°52′43″N 97°57′6″W	San Marcos	1977	
Kyle Depot		22587	100 N Front St 29°59′20″N 97°52′30″W	Kyle, Texas	2019	
Lloyd Gideon Johnson House†		10285	1030 Belvin St. 29°52′37″N 97°57′12″W	San Marcos	1982	
Max and Anna Schiwitz Homestead		23504	4037 Cotton Gin Rd. 29°57′29″N 97°47′12″W	Uhland	2022	
Marshall–Chapman Home‡		10300	500 Mercer St. 30°11′33″N 98°5′33″W	Dripping Springs	1976	
McElroy-Severn House (Stagecoach House and Onion Creek Post Office)†#		17245	808 N. Main St. 30°5′23″N 97°50′13″W	Buda	2012	150 feet north of Loop 4 (Main Street), one mile west of IH 35
Miss Lillie Dobie's House		18537	450 River Rd. 29°59′40″N 98°6′1″W	Wimberley	2016	
O. T. Brown Home‡		10239	716 Belvin St. 29°52′50″N 97°57′1″W	San Marcos	1981	
Old D. A. Young Building		10340	108 S. Burleson St. 29°59′17″N 97°52′40″W	Kyle	1968	nw corner of S. Burleson and Miller
Old Fish Hatchery Office Building		10275	206 N. C.M. Allen Pkwy. 29°53′5″N 97°56′10″W	San Marcos	1982	
Old Main†#	More images	10307	250 Old Main Dr., Texas State University 29°53′21″N 97°56′19″W	San Marcos	1963	
Old Storey Home		10329	702 Burleson St. 29°52′54″N 97°57′2″W	San Marcos	1970	
Peel-Kretzemeier House		23637	108 S. Nance 29°59′18″N 97°52′43″W	Kyle	2022	
Ragsdale-Jackman-Yarbrough House†		10316	621 W. San Antonio St. 29°52′45″N 97°56′47″W	San Marcos	1972	
Robert Early McKie House		10297	613 Lindsey St. 29°52′58″N 97°57′1″W	San Marcos	1989	
Robert Hixon Belvin Home‡		10236	730 Belvin St. 29°52′49″N 97°57′2″W	San Marcos	1974	
Rylander-Kyle House†	More images	17244	711 W. San Antonio St. 29°52′43″N 97°56′49″W	San Marcos	2012	San Marcos, 711 W. San Antonio Street
Sanders-Grosgebauer House		10326	827 W. San Antonio St. 29°52′37″N 97°56′56″W	San Marcos	1992	
Southside School		16941	518 S. Guadalupe St. 29°52′29″N 97°56′26″W	San Marcos	2011	Northwest corner of Lee and LBJ Streets
The Calaboose		10246	200 W. Martin Luther King Jr. Dr. 29°52′48″N 97°56′33″W	San Marcos	1990	corner of Martin Luther King and Fredericksburg
Wimberley-Hughes House		18536	14050-B RR 12 29°59′50″N 98°5′54″W	Wimberley	2016	

== Hemphill County ==
Registered Texas Historic Landmark	Image	Marker number	Physical address	Nearest city	Year designated	Location description
First National Bank of Canadian		1793	200 E. Main St. 35°54′53″N 100°23′6″W	Canadian	1970	200 E. Main Street, Canadian
Glazier Calaboose		22798	US 60 36°0′44.5″N 100°15′45″W	Glazier	2020	Northeast edge of Glazier
Hemphill County Jail		2434	401 E. Purcell Ave. 35°54′46″N 100°23′0″W	Canadian	1970	Courthouse Square, Main & 5th Street, Canadian
Jones Mansion		2846	604 E. Main St. 35°54′43″N 100°22′53″W	Canadian	1982	6th & Main Streets, Canadian
The Former Canadian Hospital		5336	700 E. Elsie Ave. 35°54′45″N 100°22′43″W	Canadian	1970	at intersection of 7th & Elsie Street, Canadian
W. C. T. U. Building		5668	500 E. Main St. 35°54′45″N 100°22′56″W	Canadian	1965	500 Main Street, Canadian

== Henderson County ==
Registered Texas Historic Landmark	Image	Marker number	Physical address	Nearest city	Year designated	Location description
1925 Henderson County Jail		16722	201 E. Larkin St. 32°12′24″N 95°51′12″W	Athens	2011	Athens, 201 E. Larkin
Coleman, Nat P., Home		15047		Athens	1962	
Faulk-Gauntt Building†	More images	10352	217 N. Prarieville St. 32°12′21″N 95°51′19″W	Athens	1981	
Henderson County Courthouse	More images	13831	100 E. Tyler St. 32°12′18″N 95°51′16″W	Athens	2003	Henderson County Courthouse grounds
Meredith Campground and Tabernacle		10367	CR 3901 W of CR 3900 32°20′41″N 95°52′19″W	Athens	1991	take SH 19 9 miles north to CR 3900; go west and north 3 mi. to CR 3901; go west on CR 3901 to marker
Pioneer Oak		10372	217 N. Prarieville St. 32°12′21″N 95°51′19″W	Athens	1967	Hwy. 175 E, marker in the museum
Wofford, Bush W., Home (RELOCATED)		15379	1601 Patterson Rd. 32°12′45″N 95°52′46″W	Athens	1962	

== Hidalgo County ==
Registered Texas Historic Landmark	Image	Marker number	Physical address	Nearest city	Year designated	Location description
American Legion Hall		150	316 S. Main St. 26°10′0″N 98°3′17″W	Donna	1964	316 S. Main
Buell School		558	218 E. Juarez Ave. 26°10′0″N 98°3′17″W	Pharr	1990	218 E. Juarez, Pharr
Casa de Palmas†		747	101 N. Main St. 26°11′52″N 98°10′53″W	McAllen	1979	101 N Main St.
Cortez Hotel†		13091	260 S. Texas Blvd. 26°9′33″N 97°59′27″W	Weslaco	2004	260 S Texas Ave
D. Guerra & Sons Store		15838	100 S. 17th St. 26°12′13″N 98°14′17″W	McAllen	2009	SE corner of Austin & S 17th
Don Florencio Saenz Homestead†		1245	CR 1702 26°4′14″N 97°56′44″W	Toluca Ranch	1965	at Toluca Ranch: from intersection of US 281 and FM 1015, go S on FM 1015 about 0.8 mi., then take Rancho Toluca Road E 0.27 mi. to palm tree lined lane, then go S 0.25 mi.
Donna Central Elementary School		1252	316 N. Main St. 26°10′32″N 98°3′11″W	Donna	1990	Main Street at Scobey Avenue, Donna
Edinburg Junior College Auditorium		1389	415 W. University Dr. 26°18′13″N 98°9′59″W	Edinburg	1989	N. Seventh and McIntyre, Edinburg
Former Hidalgo Post Office†		1948	117 E. Flora Ave. 26°5′58″N 98°15′43″W	Hidalgo	1965	First & Flora Streets, Hidalgo
Gregg Wood Home‡		2278	1215 Doherty Ave. 26°13′6″N 98°19′28″W	Mission	1984	1215 Doherty, Mission
John Closner Home		2773	200 N. Closner Blvd. 26°18′9″N 98°9′42″W	Edinburg	1966	Bus. US 281, Hildago Co. Museum, Edinburg
Kiwanis Club of Pharr		2961	302 W. Park Ave. 26°11′42″N 98°11′14″W	Pharr	1981	302 W. Park, Pharr
La Loma Ranch Headquarters		2996	10 mi. N on US 281 26°32′54″N 98°7′23″W	Edinburg vicinity	1963	from Edinburg, go 10 miles north on Hwy 281. (no access-private)
La Lomita Chapel‡	More images	2997	La Lomita Park 5 mi. S of town off FM 1016 26°9′28″N 98°19′50″W	Mission	1964	from Mission, take FM 1016 south about 5 miles to La Lomita Park
Lamar Junior High School		15858	1009 N. 10th St. 26°12′47″N 98°13′44″W	McAllen	2009	
M. & J. Nelson Building†		14036	300-308 S. Main St. 26°12′5″N 98°14′6″W	McAllen	2007	300 Main St
McAllen Post Office		3272	301 S. Main St. 26°12′4″N 98°14′5″W	McAllen	1986	351 South Main Street, McAllen
Mercedes City Hall		3342	323 S. Ohio Ave. 26°8′53″N 97°54′45″W	Mercedes	1994	323 South Ohio Street, Mercedes
Old Hidalgo County Courthouse†		3745	2 E. Flora Ave. 26°5′59″N 98°15′46″W	Hidalgo	1964	First and Flora, Hidalgo
Old Hidalgo County Jail†		3744	1 E. Esperanza Ave. 26°6′0″N 98°15′45″W	Hidalgo	1984	First and Flora
Old Hidalgo County Jail		3746	121 E. McIntyre St. 26°18′10″N 98°9′41″W	Edinburg	1966	Museum of South Texas History
Our Lady of Guadalupe Catholic Church	More images	3883	620 N. Dunlap Ave. 26°12′43″N 98°19′38″W	Mission	1990	6th Dunlap Streets, Mission
Paris Gum Factory		17235	609 W. Bus. US 83 26°12′9″N 98°13′34″W	McAllen	2012	Southeast corner Business Highway 83 and West Sixth Street
Percy Herman House		18215	520 N. 15th St. 26°12′34″N 98°14′4″W	McAllen	2015	West side of property along 15th Street where the street sidewalk and entry sidewalk intersect. If facing the house the marker would sit in the grass at the northeast corner of the sidewalk intersections.
Rio Theater†	More images	4272	516 Doherty Ave. 26°12′39″N 98°19′30″W	Mission	1982	516 Doherty, Mission
Saint Joseph's Church†		4458	CR 1702 26°4′14″N 97°56′45″W	Toluca Ranch	1965	at Toluca Ranch; from intersection of US 281 and FM 1015 go S on FM 1015 about 0.8 mi., then take Rancho Toluca Road E 0.27 mi. to palm tree lined lane, then go S 0.25 mi.
Sam and Marjorie Miller House†		12950	707 N. 15th St. 26°12′39″N 98°14′4″W	McAllen	2002	
San Juan Hotel		4543	125 W. Fifth St. 26°11′22″N 98°9′25″W	San Juan	1985	125 West 5th Street (Business 83), San Juan
San Juan Plantation		4544	Doffin Canal Rd. 0.25 mi. W of Stewart Rd. 26°5′0″N 98°10′10″W	San Juan	1964	from San Juan, take FM 2557 south to Highway 281, about 5.5 miles and continue south on County Road for .5 miles to Loval Road, then go west about .25 miles
Shary Building†		4661	900 Doherty Ave. 26°12′54″N 98°19′28″W	Mission	1997	
Skaggs House	Skaggs House Frontera Audubon Weslaco TX	4945	1027 S. Texas Blvd. 26°8′54″N 97°59′22″W	Weslaco	1993	1027 S. Texas Ave., Weslaco
Southern Pacific Depot		4986	100 S. Bicentennial Blvd. 26°12′9″N 98°13′34″W	McAllen	1986	100 S. Bicentennial, McAllen
Southern Pacific Depot		4987	602 W. University Dr. 26°12′13″N 98°14′23″W	Edinburg	1986	602 University, Edinburg
St. Joseph's Church†		7171	CR 1702 26°4′14″N 97°56′45″W	Toluca Lake	1965	
The Border Theater†	More images	12060	905 N. Conway Ave. 26°12′54″N 98°19′33″W	Mission	1997	
Weslaco City Hall		5755	500 S. Kansas Ave. 26°9′24″N 97°59′24″W	Weslaco	1978	Weslaco City Hall, 500 S. Kansas Ave., Weslaco
Weslaco High School		14484	S. Iowa Ave. between E. Sixth St. and E. Seventh St. 26°9′16″N 97°59′17″W	Weslaco	2008	S. Iowa St. at 7th St.

== Hill County ==
Registered Texas Historic Landmark	Image	Marker number	Physical address	Nearest city	Year designated	Location description
Abbott House‡		67	133 Corsicana St. 32°0′53″N 97°7′26″W	Hillsboro	1986	
Bond's Alley		449	Bisects 100 blk W. Elm St. to W. Gould St. 32°0′37″N 97°7′51″W	Hillsboro	1969	southside of Courthouse Square, go west Elm, Hillsboro
Brin House‡		511	109 Corsicana St. 32°0′53″N 97°7′30″W	Hillsboro	1981	109 Corsicana, Hillsboro
Carver Homestead		16729	1127 E. Jefferson Ave. 31°57′29″N 97°18′22″W	Whitney	2011	1127 East Jefferson Avenue
Condor House		1021	307 Bois D'Arc Ave. 31°50′50″N 96°47′54″W	Hubbard	1984	307 Bois D'Arc, Hubbard
Davis Home‡		1175	130 Corsicana St. 32°0′51″N 97°7′25″W	Hillsboro	1965	130 Corsicana, Hillsboro
Files, F. Marion, Home		14839	6 mi. E on FM 66	Itasca	1966	FM 66, 6 mi E of Itasca
First Methodist Church of Hubbard		1760	208 NW Second St. 31°50′44″N 96°47′51″W	Hubbard	1991	208 North 2nd Street west, Hubbard
Gebhardt Bakery†		2115	119 E. Franklin St. 32°0′42″N 97°7′44″W	Hillsboro	1983	119 East Franklin Street, Hillsboro
George L. and Roxie Brooks Porter Home‡		13212	400 Corsicana St. 32°0′51″N 97°7′11″W	Hillsboro	2004	400 Corsicana St
Hill County Courthouse†	More images	2481	1 N. Waco St. 32°0′40″N 97°7′50″W	Hillsboro	1964	Waco and Franklin, Courthouse Square, Hillsboro
Hill County Jail†		2482	120 N. Waco St. 32°0′51″N 97°7′46″W	Hillsboro	1981	120 North Waco, Hillsboro
Hillsboro Post Office Building†	More images	2488	118 S. Waco St. 32°0′35″N 97°7′48″W	Hillsboro	1982	115 south Waco, Hillsboro
Hubbard High School		17693	300 NW Sixth St. 31°50′53″N 96°48′6″W	Hubbard	2013	
Itasca Railroad Depot		2661	105 Wampus Cat Dr. 32°9′53″N 97°8′31″W	Itasca	1982	at Itasca Museum, Hooks Street, on east side of Itasca
J. T. Baker House†		2684	Near NE end of CR 1127 32°9′33″N 97°23′25″W	Blum	1990	2 miles northeast of Blum, via caliche road from BJ Towing
J. W. Park Home		2688	206 N. Wesley St. 32°9′48″N 97°8′50″W	Itasca	1986	206 North Wesley Street, Itasca
Katy Depot†#		2906	115 N. Covington St. 32°0′46″N 97°7′52″W	Hillsboro	1981	North Covington Street, just north of courthouse square, Hillsboro
Lumpkin House‡		3146	418 E. Franklin St. 32°0′41″N 97°7′18″W	Hillsboro	1973	418 East Franklin, Hillsboro
McDaniel Family Home		3289	400 NW Third St. 31°50′43″N 96°47′59″W	Hubbard	1969	Maple and North 3rd west, Hubbard. Marker reported missing Oct. 2008.
McKinnon - Anderson House‡		3299	205 Corsicana St. 32°0′53″N 97°7′22″W	Hillsboro	1971	205 Corsicana, Hillsboro
Old G. D. Tarlton House‡		2088	211 N. Pleasant St. 32°0′45″N 97°7′35″W	Hillsboro	1972	211 North Pleasant Street, Hillsboro
Peoria Cumberland Presbyterian Church		3986	120 N. Waco St. facing E. Paschal St. behind Old Jail 32°0′47″N 97°7′46″W	Hillsboro	1963	at Hill Co. Cell Block Museum 120 North Waco, Hillsboro
Pioneer Bank Building†		4023	68 W. Elm St. 32°0′37″N 97°7′51″W	Hillsboro	1966	on square, Covington and Elm streets, Hillsboro
Rigsby Home		4266	NE corner NW Seventh St. at Cactus Ave. 31°50′58″N 96°48′7″W	Hubbard	1964	Cactus Avenue and 7th, Hubbard
St. Mary's Episcopal Church‡		5062	200 N. Abbott St. 32°0′47″N 97°7′23″W	Hillsboro	1987	200 North Abbott Street, Hillsboro
Taylor, J.A., Home (MARKER GONE)		14363		Blum	1965	
Turner House†	More images	5573	3 mi. E on FM 934 32°10′22″N 97°5′30″W	Itasca	1965	from Itasca take FM 934 about miles to house, on north side of road on Private Property

== Hockley County ==
There are currently no Recorded Texas Historic Landmarks listed within the county.

== Hood County ==
Registered Texas Historic Landmark	Image	Marker number	Physical address	Nearest city	Year designated	Location description
Aston House		221	221 E. Bridge St. 32°26′36″N 97°47′8″W	Granbury	1978	
Aston-Landers Building‡		222	113 E. Bridge St. 32°26′36″N 97°47′13″W	Granbury	1974	
Baker-Carmichael House†	More images	15016	226 E. Pearl St. 32°26′32″N 97°47′8″W	Granbury	1996	
Baker-Doyle Building‡		283	132 N. Houston St. 32°26′35″N 97°47′16″W	Granbury	1988	
Baker-Rylee Building and Town Square Service Station‡		284	100 N. Crockett St. 32°26′32″N 97°47′11″W	Granbury	1986	
Bowden Kennon House		473	505 W. Doyle St. 32°26′25″N 97°47′32″W	Granbury	1984	
Cresson School		13144	9304 Pittsburgh St. 32°31′52″N 97°37′16″W	Cresson	2003	Cresson, 9304 Pittsburgh Street
Daniel-Harris Home		1169	403 W. Bridge St. 32°26′35″N 97°47′28″W	Granbury	1981	
Daniel House		1166	107 E. Bluff St. 32°26′28″N 97°47′12″W	Granbury	1981	
David L. Nutt Home		1172	319 E. Bridge St. 32°26′36″N 97°47′4″W	Granbury	1966	
Dr. William and Eunice Walker House		12077	315 W. Bridge St. 32°26′35″N 97°47′26″W	Granbury	1998	
E. A. Hannaford Building‡		12078	130 N. Houston St. 32°26′35″N 97°47′16″W	Granbury	1999	
E. A. Hannaford House		1313	126 S. Lambert St. 32°26′29″N 97°47′21″W	Granbury	1988	
First National Bank‡		6250	101 E. Bridge St. 32°26′36″N 97°47′15″W	Granbury	1972	
First Presbyterian Church of Granbury	More images	1837	309 W. Bridge St. 32°26′35″N 97°47′25″W	Granbury	1974	
Former Acton Masonic Lodge Hall		1945	3600 Fall Creek Hwy. 32°26′29″N 97°41′10″W	Acton	1975	FM 167 Acton near south city limits
Glenn Brothers Building‡		2190	109 E. Bridge St. 32°26′36″N 97°47′14″W	Granbury	1974	
Gordon Home		2229	308 E. Pearl St. 32°26′33″N 97°47′6″W	Granbury	1983	
Granbury Light Plant		2243	401 E. Ewell St. 32°26′51″N 97°47′5″W	Granbury	1994	Corner of East Ewell and North Brazos streets
Granbury Opera House‡	More images	2245	133 E. Pearl St. 32°26′31″N 97°47′13″W	Granbury	1977	
Granbury Railroad Depot	More images	2246	109 E. Ewell St. 32°26′53″N 97°47′14″W	Granbury	1984	
Hardware and Tin Shop‡		2375	107 E. Bridge St. 32°26′36″N 97°47′14″W	Granbury	1974	
Harris Building		2389	123-127 E. Pearl St. 32°26′31″N 97°47′13″W	Granbury	1978	114-118 East Pearl Street, Granbury
Haynes-Burns-Ewell Building‡		2412	105 E. Pearl St. 32°26′31″N 97°47′15″W	Granbury	1976	
Holderness-Aiken House		2508	321 W. Bridge St. 32°26′35″N 97°47′27″W	Granbury	1975	
Hood County Courthouse‡#	More images	2552	100 E. Pearl St. 32°26′34″N 97°47′13″W	Granbury	1970	100th block of Pearl Street, Granbury Courthouse lawn
Hood County Jailhouse‡#	More images	2553	208 N. Crockett St. 32°26′37″N 97°47′11″W	Granbury	1970	
J.D. and Georgia Brown House		2672	118 W. Bluff St. 32°26′29″N 97°47′18″W	Granbury	1994	
J.F. and J. Nutt Building‡	More images	2676	119 E. Bridge St. 32°26′36″N 97°47′12″W	Granbury	1970	
John W. Bull Stone House		2818	Deep Down Rd. SW of Paluxy near Erath County line 32°14′35″N 97°57′0″W	Granbury vicinity	1970	from Granbury, take FM 51 south about 14.5 miles to FM 205 west and turn southwest immediately onto CR. Follow CR about 2.7 miles southwest then take gravel road south about 1/10 miles.
Lees-Bryan House		6260	121 W. Bluff St. 32°26′28″N 97°47′18″W	Granbury	1985	
Smith-Savage House		6261	826 Thorp Springs Rd. 32°27′3″N 97°47′30″W	Granbury	1986	
The Fair‡		5331	115 E. Bridge St. 32°26′36″N 97°47′13″W	Granbury	1974	
Thrash-Landers-Hiner House		5479	201 W. Pearl St. 32°26′31″N 97°47′20″W	Granbury	1994	
Tolar Tabernacle		15946	104 Donley St. 32°23′14″N 97°55′16″W	Tolar	2009	
W. D. and Essie Gafford House		12623	361 S. Caddo St. 32°30′25″N 98°3′2″W	Lipan	2001	1 mile south of Lipan on FM 1189
Wright-Henderson-Duncan House†	More images	5913	703 Spring St. 32°26′7″N 97°47′41″W	Granbury	1978	Spring Street and SH 144, near FM 51, Granbury

== Hopkins County ==
Registered Texas Historic Landmark	Image	Marker number	Physical address	Nearest city	Year designated	Location description
Ashcroft House		18771	333 College St. 33°8′17″N 95°35′43″W	Sulphur Springs	2017	
Hopkins County Courthouse†#	More images	7315	118 Church St. 33°8′18″N 95°36′2″W	Sulphur Springs	1975	

== Houston County ==
Registered Texas Historic Landmark	Image	Marker number	Physical address	Nearest city	Year designated	Location description
A. E. Gossett Home		10961	1.7 mi. E on SH 21 31°19′55″N 95°25′59″W	Crockett	1964	from Crokett take SH 21 east about 1.7 miles
Augusta Union Church		11228	CR 1675 S of FM 227 31°31′52″N 95°19′57″W	Grapeland	1990	9 mi. E of Grapeland on FM 227 to Augusta, 0.2 mi. S on CR 1675
C. R. Rich Building		11234	100 S. Commerce St. 31°7′36″N 95°26′43″W	Lovelady	1985	southeast corner of SH 19 and FM 1280
Cannon-Stanton House		11218	138 S. Grace St. 31°19′0″N 95°26′28″W	Crockett	1989	138 South Grace, Crockett
Daniel-Merriwether House		17740	712 Julia St. 31°21′48″N 95°10′54″W	Kennard	2013	From SH 7 east in the City of Kennard, take a left on Julia Street and go .2 tenths of a mi. The street dead ends at the Daniel-Rowe House.
Downes-Aldrich House†		11095	206 N. Seventh St. 31°19′10″N 95°27′16″W	Crockett	1972	corner of Milam and 7th in Crockett
Early Bank Building		11096	505 E. Goliad Ave. 31°19′3″N 95°27′25″W	Crockett	1972	505 E. Goliad in Crockett
First Christian Church of Grapeland		11127	213 N. Market St. 31°29′36″N 95°28′46″W	Grapeland	1972	
Henry Allen Pennington House		11223	CR 2245 N of FM 227 31°28′15″N 95°35′25″W	Grapeland	1985	7 miles west of Grapeland on FM 227, then north on CR 2245
House Built by A. T. Monroe	More images	11210	707 E. Houston Ave. 31°19′8″N 95°27′15″W	Crockett	1962	707 E. Houston. Also known as George W. Crook Home. 1969 RTHL marker for Monroe-Crook House on same site.
Houston County Courthouse†#	More images	12422	401 E. Houston Ave. 31°19′5″N 95°27′27″W	Crockett	2000	Houston County Courthouse grounds
Monroe-Crook House†	More images	11211	707 E. Houston Ave. 31°19′8″N 95°27′15″W	Crockett	1969	707 E. Houston. 1965 marker for A. T. Monroe House on same site.
Newton-Norris House		11220	902 E. Goliad Ave. 31°19′5″N 95°27′4″W	Crockett	1990	
Patton-Buchanan Building		11221	311 E. Goliad Ave. 31°19′3″N 95°27′30″W	Crockett	1982	311 East Goliad, Crockett
Spence-Chamberlain House		8810	717 E. Houston Ave. 31°19′6″N 95°27′10″W	Crockett	1994	717 E. Houston Ave.
Spinks-Mayes Building		11192	312 E. Houston Ave. 31°19′7″N 95°27′29″W	Crockett	1982	corner of West Houston Ave. and North 4th in Crockett
W.V. McConnell Building		11238	113 S. Fourth St. 31°19′4″N 95°27′29″W	Crockett	1982	113 4th Street, west side of courthouse aquare
William Preston and Rebecca Kate Conner House		12087	609 CR 1175 31°27′12″N 95°7′53″W	Ratcliff	1997	1 mi. N of Ratcliff on Fm 227; 2 mi. N on CR 1165; .5 mi. E on CR 1170; .5 mi. N on CR 1175 (Forest Road 511)

== Howard County ==
Registered Texas Historic Landmark	Image	Marker number	Physical address	Nearest city	Year designated	Location description
First Permanent Building in Big Spring		1808	121 N. Main S. 32°15′22″N 101°28′45″W	Big Spring	1962	121 Main Street, Big Spring
Potton House†#		4100	200 S. Gregg St. 32°15′0″N 101°28′42″W	Big Spring	1976	200 Gregg Street, Big Spring
Settles Hotel†	More images	13722	200 E. Third St. 32°15′10″N 101°28′31″W	Big Spring	1987	200 E Third. Marker reported not on building Dec. 2006.
St. Thomas Catholic Church	More images	5084	605 N. Main St. 32°15′33″N 101°28′51″W	Big Spring	1988	605 North Main Street, Big Spring

== Hudspeth County ==
Registered Texas Historic Landmark	Image	Marker number	Physical address	Nearest city	Year designated	Location description
Fort Hancock Mercantile		1989	1425 Knox Ave. 31°18′7″N 105°50′33″W	Fort Hancock	1980	Building is located on SH Spur 148 at railroad tracks Ft. Hancock
Hudspeth County Courthouse†#		2591	201 W. Millican St. 31°10′47″N 105°21′25″W	Sierra Blanca	1962	located 3 blocks N. of Business IH-10 and just west of FM 1111, Sierra Blanca
Sierra Blanca Methodist Church		4694	108 N. Sierra Blanca Ave. 31°10′36″N 105°21′24″W	Sierra Blanca	1968	located 2 blocks N. of Business IH-10 on FM 1111 N., Sierra Blanca

== See also ==
Recorded Texas Historic Landmarks listed by county
Anderson-Callahan • Cameron-Duval • Eastland-Gray • Grayson-Hudspeth • Hunt-Martin • Mason-Rusk • Sabine-Travis • Trinity-Zavala
