= Bonham State Park =

Protected area in Texas, US

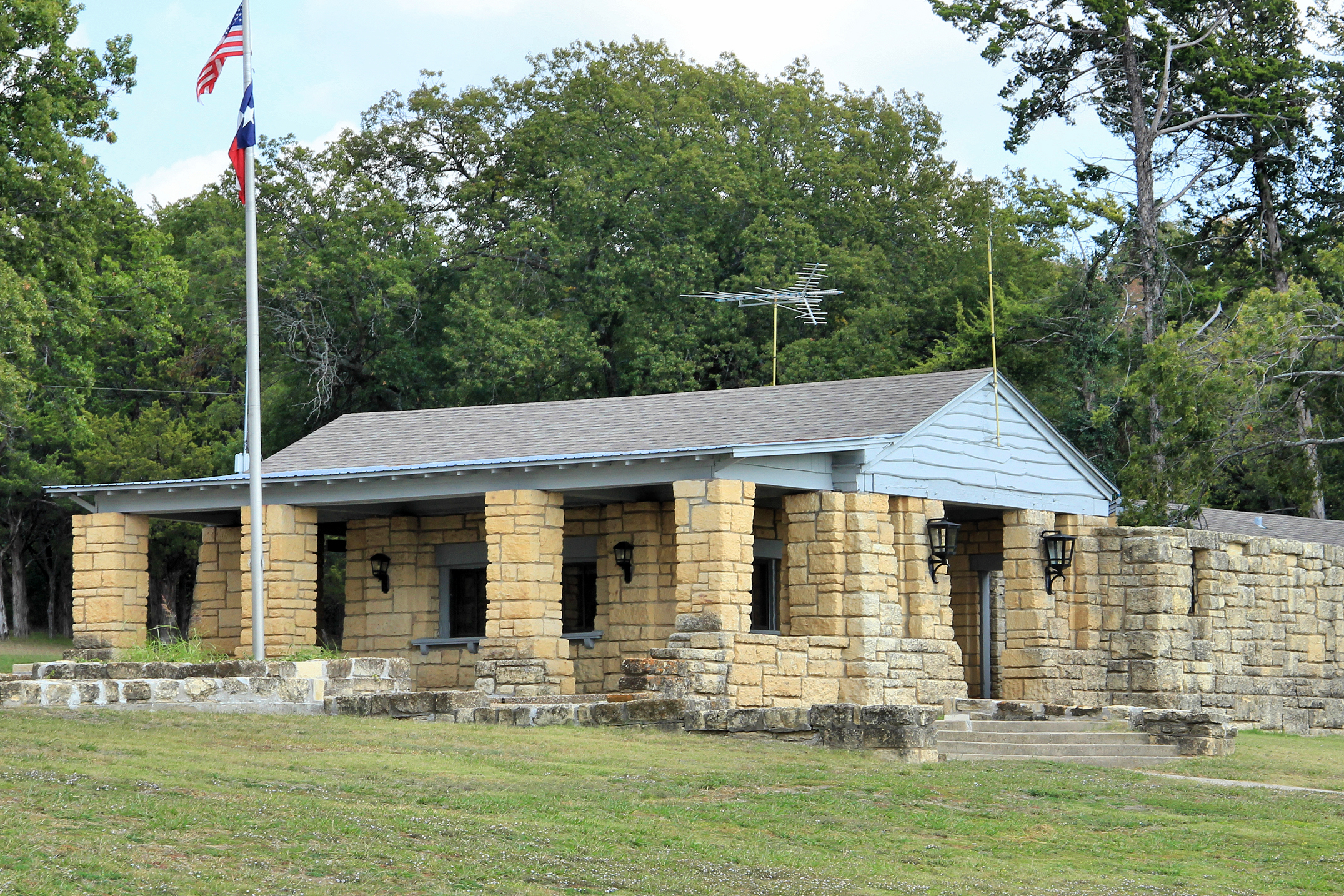
- The current park headquarters, originally built by the Civilian Conservation Corps ca. 1935

- Location within Texas Location within the United States
- Location: Fannin County, Texas
- Nearest city: Bonham, Texas
- Coordinates: 33°32′41″N 96°08′44″W
- Area: 261 acres (106 ha)
- Established: 1936
- Visitors: 45,926 (in 2025)
- Governing body: Texas Parks and Wildlife Department
- Website: Official site

Bonham State Park is a 261-acre (1.06 km^{2}) state park located near Bonham, Texas in Fannin County, United States. The park opened in 1936 and is managed by the Texas Parks and Wildlife Department.

== History ==
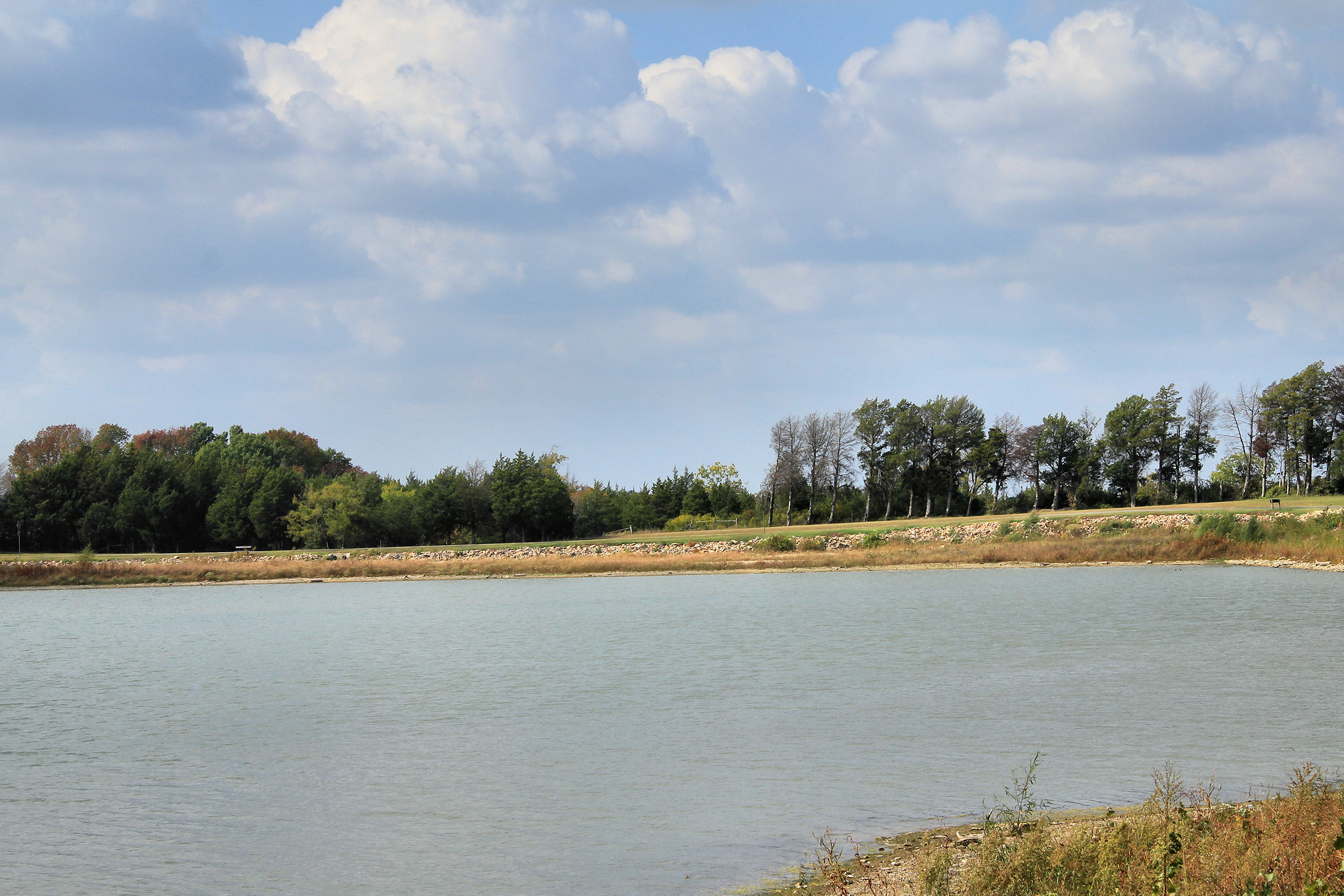
Bonham State Park Lake

The state acquired the land for the park in 1933 from the City of Bonham. Civilian Conservation Corps Company 894 developed the park between 1933 and 1936, landscaping the rocky, hilly terrain for erosion control and recreational purposes, and constructing an earthen dam to impound a 65-acre (260,000 m^{2}). They constructed buildings of local cream-colored limestone and Eastern red cedar, working under the supervision of Bonham architect Joe C. Lair and San Antonio architect William C. Caldwell. The overall design exhibits a rustic style.

The CCC also built the entrance portal, concession building (currently the park headquarters and storage facility), waterfront storage building (currently the boat house), pavilion and dance terrace, picnic tables, barbecue pits, water fountains, vehicle and foot bridges, culverts and a water tower.

== Activities ==
There is (unsupervised) swimming and fishing in the lake as well as camping, picnicking, mountain biking and boating (5 mph speed limit).

== Facilities ==
Facilities include; restrooms with and without showers, picnic sites (including one group picnic area), campsites with water and electricity, campsites with water, a group camp with barracks and a dining hall, which accommodates approximately 94 people (the facility is only rented as a single unit, not separately), an 11-mile (18 km) trail for mountain biking and hiking, a playground, a half basketball court, a launching ramp, a boat dock, and a lighted fishing pier.

== Nature ==
=== Plants ===
The park is situated in the Texas blackland prairies. The terrain is dominated by grassland interspersed by woodlands. More luxuriant woodlands occur along water courses and the lake's shoreline. Although the park's grasslands are no longer pristine, they are recovering nicely and have small areas dominated by little bluestem. The woodlands are composed of Texas live oak, eastern redcedar, osage-orange, smooth sumac and Eve's Necklacepod, with sugar hackberry, cottonwood, black willow, and green ash becoming more common along the creeks and lake shore. Numerous wildflowers and flowering shrubs cover the gently rolling prairie in the spring, and stands of cedar and mixed hardwoods provide a panorama of multicolored leaves in the fall.

=== Animals ===
Wildlife is limited because of the relatively small size of the park. However, the lake shoreline provides habitats for American beaver, common raccoon, Virginia opossum, and a number of visiting songbirds. Although a few woodland birds are permanent residents, visitor and migrant species outnumber the residents.

== Area Attractions ==
Nearby attractions include the Eisenhower State park, Eisenhower Birthplace and Sam Bell Maxey House State Historic Sites. Bonham attractions include the Sam Rayburn Museum and the Sam Rayburn House Museum, both named in honor of Sam Rayburn. Rayburn was a Fannin County native who held the office of U.S. Speaker of the House for 17 years, the longest tenure in U.S. history.

== See also ==
- List of Texas state parks
