= National Register of Historic Places listings in Fannin County, Texas =

Location of Fannin County in Texas

This is a list of the National Register of Historic Places listings in Fannin County, Texas.

This is intended to be a complete list of properties and districts listed on the National Register of Historic Places in Fannin County, Texas. There are one National Historic Landmark, one district, six individual properties, and one former property listed on the National Register in the county. The National Historic Landmark is also a State Historic Site, a State Antiquities Landmark, and a Recorded Texas Historic Landmark while three additional individually listed properties are also Recorded Texas Historic Landmarks.

This National Park Service list is complete through NPS recent listings posted May 1, 2026.

== Current listings ==
The locations of National Register properties and districts may be seen in a mapping service provided.

	Name on the Register	Image	Date listed	Location	City or town	Description
1	Bonham VA Hospital		October 13, 2022 (#100008265)	1201 East 9th St. 33°35′05″N 96°10′00″W	Bonham	
2	Clendenen-Carleton House	Clendenen-Carleton House	May 14, 1979 (#79002937)	803 N. Main St. 33°34′52″N 96°10′46″W	Bonham	
3	Haden House	Haden House	January 8, 1980 (#80004118)	603 W. Bonham St. 33°25′30″N 95°57′10″W	Ladonia	Recorded Texas Historic Landmark
4	Lake Fannin Organizational Camp		June 4, 2001 (#01000611)	1 mi (1.6 km). W jct of Cty. Rd. 2025 and State Farm-to-Market Rd. 2554, Caddo National Grasslands; 33°46′37″N 96°09′23″W	Elwood	
5	Sam Rayburn Library and Museum	Sam Rayburn Library and Museum	May 6, 2005 (#05000386)	800 W. Sam Rayburn Dr. 33°34′42″N 96°11′16″W	Bonham	Recorded Texas Historic Landmark
6	Samuel T. Rayburn House	Samuel T. Rayburn House	June 5, 1972 (#72001361)	1.5 mi (2.4 km). W of Bonham on U.S. 82; 33°34′10″N 96°12′22″W	Bonham vicinity	State Historic Site, State Antiquities Landmark, Recorded Texas Historic Landmark
7	State Highway 78 Bridge at the Red River	State Highway 78 Bridge at the Red River	December 20, 1996 (#96001517)	OK 78, across the Red River at the OK-TX state line 33°45′10″N 96°11′45″W	Ravenna	Historic Bridges of Texas, 1866-1945 MPS; extends into Bryan County, Oklahoma
8	Texas and Pacific Railroad Depot	Texas and Pacific Railroad Depot	January 9, 1997 (#96001564)	1 Main St. 33°34′25″N 96°10′45″W	Bonham	Recorded Texas Historic Landmark
9	Thomas and Katherine Trout House	Thomas and Katherine Trout House	August 23, 1984 (#84001664)	705 Poplar St. 33°35′11″N 95°54′16″W	Honey Grove	

== Former listing ==
	Name on the Register	Image	Date listed	Date removed	Location	City or town	Description
1	Nunn House		May 6, 1980 (#80004117)	June 8, 1998	505 W. 5th St. 33°34′41″N 96°11′02″W	Bonham	Also known as the Nunn-Rainey House

== See also ==
- National Register of Historic Places listings in Texas
- Recorded Texas Historic Landmarks in Fannin County
