= National Register of Historic Places listings in Grayson County, Texas =

Location of Grayson County in Texas

This is a list of the National Register of Historic Places listings in Grayson County, Texas.

This is intended to be a complete list of properties and districts listed on the National Register of Historic Places in Grayson County, Texas. There are one district and eight individual properties along with one former property listed on the National Register in the county. Seven individually listed properties are Recorded Texas Historic Landmarks including one that is also a State Historic Site. The district contains an additional Recorded Texas Historic Landmark.

This National Park Service list is complete through NPS recent listings posted August 8, 2025.

== Current listings ==
The locations of National Register properties and districts may be seen in a mapping service provided.

	Name on the Register	Image	Date listed	Location	City or town	Description
1	Capt. Noble Allan Birge House	Capt. Noble Allan Birge House	September 18, 1986 (#86002187)	727 W. Birge; 33°38′42″N 96°37′05″W	Sherman	Recorded Texas Historic Landmark
2	George Braun House		November 20, 1975 (#75001986)	421 N. Austin Ave. 33°45′33″N 96°32′13″W	Denison	Remained for 108 years before being moved by owner Joe Pollaro to a site north of Munson Park in the year 2000
3	Denison Commercial Historic District	Denison Commercial Historic District	November 10, 1983 (#83003772)	Roughly Woodard, Main and Chestnut Sts. 33°45′19″N 96°32′22″W	Denison	Includes Recorded Texas Historic Landmarks
4	Eisenhower Birthplace	Eisenhower Birthplace	October 11, 2016 (#16000718)	720 S. Lamar; 33°44′54″N 96°32′01″W	Denison	State Historic Site, Recorded Texas Historic Landmark
5	Hall Furniture Building	Hall Furniture Building	September 14, 2002 (#02000994)	118 W. Lamar; 33°38′08″N 96°36′34″W	Sherman	Recorded Texas Historic Landmark
6	Ernst Martin Kohl Building	Ernst Martin Kohl Building	July 12, 1976 (#76002035)	300 E. Main St. 33°45′17″N 96°31′54″W	Denison	Recorded Texas Historic Landmark; part of Denison Commercial Historic District
7	Old Sherman Public Library	Old Sherman Public Library	October 23, 1986 (#86002927)	301 S. Walnut; 33°38′05″N 96°36′24″W	Sherman	Recorded Texas Historic Landmark
8	Sherman US Post Office and Courthouse	Sherman US Post Office and Courthouse	September 29, 2000 (#00001173)	101 E. Pecan St. 33°38′20″N 96°36′33″W	Sherman	Recorded Texas Historic Landmark
9	Umphress-Taylor House	Umphress-Taylor House	September 12, 1986 (#86001956)	301 Paris St. 33°24′57″N 96°34′24″W	Van Alstyne	Recorded Texas Historic Landmark

== Former listings ==
	Name on the Register	Image	Date listed	Date removed	Location	City or town	Description
1	Clifton House Hotel		April 24, 1986 (#86000948)	September 9, 1991	229 W. Gandy	Denison	

== See also ==
- National Register of Historic Places listings in Texas
- List of Texas State Historic Sites
- Recorded Texas Historic Landmarks in Grayson County
