= National Register of Historic Places listings in Lamar County, Texas =

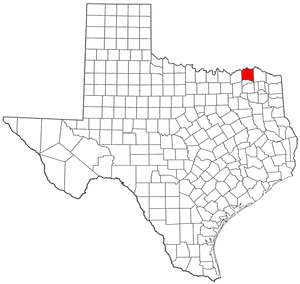
Location of Lamar County in Texas

This is a list of the National Register of Historic Places listings in Lamar County, Texas.

This is intended to be a complete list of properties and districts listed on the National Register of Historic Places in Lamar County, Texas. There are three districts and 39 individual properties listed on the National Register in the county. One individually listed property is also designated a State Historic Site, a State Antiquities Landmark (SAL), a Recorded Texas Historic Landmark (RTHL), and is part of a historic district that contains additional RTHLs. Five individually listed properties are also RTHLs, and another district contains more SALs and RTHLs.

This National Park Service list is complete through NPS recent listings posted May 1, 2026.

== Current listings ==
The publicly disclosed locations of National Register properties and districts may be seen in a mapping service provided.

	Name on the Register	Image	Date listed	Location	City or town	Description
1	Atkinson-Morris House	Atkinson-Morris House	October 26, 1988 (#88001914)	802 Fitzhugh; 33°40′07″N 95°32′49″W	Paris	Recorded Texas Historic Landmark; Historic Resources of Paris MRA
2	Bailey-Ragland House	Bailey-Ragland House	October 26, 1988 (#88001917)	433 W. Washington; 33°39′15″N 95°33′39″W	Paris	Historic Resources of Paris MRA
3	Benjamin and Adelaide Baldwin House		October 26, 1988 (#88001925)	714 Graham; 33°39′50″N 95°33′48″W	Paris	Historic Resources of Paris MRA; demolished in 2014
4	Baty-Plummer House	Baty-Plummer House	October 26, 1988 (#88001931)	708 Sherman; 33°39′27″N 95°33′48″W	Paris	Historic Resources of Paris MRA
5	Thomas and Bettie Brazelton House	Thomas and Bettie Brazelton House	October 26, 1988 (#88001932)	801 W. Sherman; 33°39′26″N 95°33′50″W	Paris	Historic Resources of Paris MRA
6	Carlton-Gladden House	Carlton-Gladden House	October 26, 1988 (#88001933)	2120 Bonham; 33°39′39″N 95°34′15″W	Paris	Historic Resources of Paris MRA
7	Church Street Historic District	Church Street Historic District	October 26, 1988 (#88001936)	Roughly bounded by E. Austin, 3rd, SE, Washington and 1st, SW Sts. 33°39′25″N 95°33′19″W	Paris	Includes State Historic Site, State Antiquities Landmark, Recorded Texas Historic Landmarks; Historic Resources of Paris MRA
8	J. M. and Emily Daniel House	J. M. and Emily Daniel House	October 26, 1988 (#88001921)	216 4th Street SW; 33°39′34″N 95°33′38″W	Paris	Historic Resources of Paris MRA
9	Ellis II Site	Ellis II Site	March 30, 1978 (#78002967)	Address restricted	Pin Hook	
10	Emerson Site	Emerson Site	December 1, 1978 (#78002968)	Address restricted	Pin Hook	
11	First Church of Christ, Scientist	First Church of Christ, Scientist	October 26, 1988 (#88001912)	339 W. Kaufman; 33°39′35″N 95°33′35″W	Paris	Classical Revival former Christian Scientist church built in 1917 after Paris' 1916 fire. Included in Historic Resources of Paris MRA.
12	First Presbyterian Church	First Presbyterian Church	October 26, 1988 (#88001913)	410 W. Kaufman; 33°39′36″N 95°33′37″W	Paris	Recorded Texas Historic Landmark; Historic Resources of Paris MRA
13	First United Methodist Church	First United Methodist Church	June 21, 1983 (#83003146)	322 Lamar St. 33°39′40″N 95°33′12″W	Paris	Churches with Decorative Interior Painting TR
14	John Chisum Gibbons House	John Chisum Gibbons House	October 26, 1988 (#88001923)	623 6th Street SE; 33°39′21″N 95°33′00″W	Paris	Historic Resources of Paris MRA
15	High House		October 26, 1988 (#88001920)	352 West Washington; 33°39′16″N 95°33′36″W	Paris	Historic Resources of Paris MRA
16	House at 705 3rd Street, SE		October 26, 1988 (#88001935)	705 3rd St., SE; 33°39′19″N 95°33′13″W	Paris	Historic Resources of Paris MRA
17	Edwin and Mary Jenkins House	Edwin and Mary Jenkins House	October 26, 1988 (#88001927)	549 5th, NW; 33°39′58″N 95°33′40″W	Paris	Historic Resources of Paris MRA
18	Johnson-McCuistion House	Johnson-McCuistion House	October 26, 1988 (#88001911)	730 Clarksville; 33°39′36″N 95°32′56″W	Paris	Recorded Texas Historic Landmark; Historic Resources of Paris MRA
19	Lamar County Hospital	Lamar County Hospital	October 26, 1988 (#88001918)	625 W. Washington; 33°39′14″N 95°33′45″W	Paris	Historic Resources of Paris MRA
20	William and Etta Latimer House		October 26, 1988 (#88001930)	707 Sherman; 33°39′26″N 95°33′48″W	Paris	Historic Resources of Paris MRA
21	Loma Alto Site	Loma Alto Site	March 29, 1978 (#78002969)	Address restricted	Pin Hook	
22	A. C. Mackin Archeological Site	A. C. Mackin Archeological Site	May 16, 1974 (#74002085)	Address restricted	Faulkner	
23	Samuel Bell Maxey House	Samuel Bell Maxey House	March 18, 1971 (#71000943)	812 E. Church St. 33°39′14″N 95°33′17″W	Paris	State Historic Site, State Antiquities Landmark, Recorded Texas Historic Landmark; part of Church Street Historic District
24	McCormic-Bishop House	McCormic-Bishop House	October 26, 1988 (#88001910)	603 8th St., SE; 33°39′22″N 95°32′53″W	Paris	Historic Resources of Paris MRA
25	Means-Justiss House		October 26, 1988 (#88001934)	537 6th St., SE; 33°39′24″N 95°33′01″W	Paris	Historic Resources of Paris MRA
26	Morris-Moore House	Morris-Moore House	October 26, 1988 (#88001926)	744 3rd St, NW; 33°40′05″N 95°33′32″W	Paris	Historic Resources of Paris MRA
27	Mt. Canaan Baptist Church	Mt. Canaan Baptist Church	July 23, 2024 (#100010581)	60 Sycamore St. 33°38′55″N 95°33′20″W	Paris	
28	Paris Commercial Historic District	Paris Commercial Historic District	December 22, 1988 (#88001937)	Roughly bounded by Price, 3rd, SE, Sherman and 4th, SW; 33°39′40″N 95°33′24″W	Paris	Includes State Antiquities Landmarks, Recorded Texas Historic Landmarks; Historic Resources of Paris MRA; a boundary increase was approved June 19, 2017.
29	Paris Grocer Company		September 26, 2025 (#100012326)	1221 South Church Street; 33°39′03″N 95°33′17″W	Paris	
30	Pine Bluff-Fitzhugh Historic District		October 26, 1988 (#88001938)	500-900 blocks of Pine Bluff and 300-600 blocks of Fitzhugh; 33°39′50″N 95°32′51″W	Paris	Historic Resources of Paris MRA
31	Thaddeus and Josepha Preston House	Thaddeus and Josepha Preston House	October 26, 1988 (#88001915)	731 E. Austin; 33°39′32″N 95°32′56″W	Paris	Historic Resources of Paris MRA
32	Ragland House	Ragland House	October 26, 1988 (#88001922)	208 5th St., SW; 33°39′35″N 95°33′41″W	Paris	Historic Resources of Paris MRA
33	Rodgers-Wade Furniture Company	Rodgers-Wade Furniture Company	October 26, 1988 (#88001919)	401 3rd Street SW; 33°39′29″N 95°33′31″W	Paris	Historic Resources of Paris MRA
34	Santa Fe-Frisco Depot	Santa Fe-Frisco Depot	August 20, 1998 (#88001939)	1100 W. Kaufman; 33°39′35″N 95°34′01″W	Paris	Recorded Texas Historic Landmark; Historic Resources of Paris MRA
35	Scott-Roden Mansion	Scott-Roden Mansion	September 15, 1983 (#83003147)	425 S. Church St. 33°39′27″N 95°33′15″W	Paris	Recorded Texas Historic Landmark; part of Church Street Historic District
36	St. Paul's Baptist Church	St. Paul's Baptist Church	October 26, 1988 (#88001928)	454 2nd, NE; 33°39′58″N 95°33′15″W	Paris	Historic Resources of Paris MRA
37	State Highway 5 Bridge at High Creek		October 10, 1996 (#96001102)	FM 1509, 1.8 mi (2.9 km). W of jct. with FM 38; 33°36′43″N 95°44′50″W	Brookston	Historic Bridges of Texas, 1866-1945 MPS; Warren pony truss bridge built in 1920, deck replaced with wood in 1935, entire bridge removed and replaced in 2001.
38	State Highway Bridge 5 at Big Pine Creek		October 10, 1996 (#96001103)	FM 1510, 1.4 mi (2.3 km). E of jct. with FM 38; 33°39′39″N 95°40′23″W	Brookston	Historic Bridges of Texas, 1866-1945 MPS; Warren pony truss bridge built in 1920, deck replaced with wood in 1935, entire bridge removed in 2001.
39	Swindle Site	Swindle Site	March 29, 1978 (#78002970)	Address restricted	Pin Hook	
40	W. S. and Mary Trigg House	W. S. and Mary Trigg House	October 26, 1988 (#88001924)	441 12th St., SE; 33°39′26″N 95°32′37″W	Paris	Historic Resources of Paris MRA
41	Wise-Fielding House and Carriage House	Wise-Fielding House and Carriage House	December 22, 1988 (#88001916)	418 W. Washington; 33°39′17″N 95°33′39″W	Paris	Historic Resources of Paris MRA
42	Edgar and Annie Wright House	Edgar and Annie Wright House	October 26, 1988 (#88001929)	857 Lamar; 33°39′41″N 95°32′50″W	Paris	Historic Resources of Paris MRA

== See also ==
- National Register of Historic Places listings in Texas
- Recorded Texas Historic Landmarks in Lamar County
