= Levi Jordan Plantation State Historic Site =

Levi Jordan Plantation State Historic Site Texas State Historic Site
- Levi Jordan Plantation State Historic Site (the United States)
- 28°59′57″N 95°38′54″W
- Location: 7234 FM 521, Brazoria, Texas

History
- Designated: 2001
- Built: 1848-–1851

Site notes
- Architect: Levi Jordan
- Architectural style: Greek Revival
- Governing body: Texas Historical Commission
- Website: Levi Jordan Plantation State Historic Site

Recorded Texas Historic Landmark
- Designated: 1967
- Reference no.: 9570

The Levi Jordan Plantation is a historical site and building, located on Farm to Market Road 521, 4 miles (6.4 km) southwest of the city of Brazoria, in the U.S. state of Texas. Founded as a forced-labor farm worked by enslaved Black people, it was one of the largest sugar and cotton producing plantations in Texas during the mid-19th century, as well as a local center of human trafficking.

It was designated as a Recorded Texas Historic Landmark in 1967. The University of Houston's Department of Anthropology and Professor Kenneth L. Brown has done many years of research at this plantation.

== Levi Jordan ==
Levi Jordan (1793–1873), a Georgia-born planter, traveled in 1848 to Brazoria County, Texas, bringing with him twelve enslaved Black people. Previously, Jordan had owned adjoining plantations on the Louisiana-Arkansas border (Union County, Arkansas) with his son-in-law, James Campbell McNeill, however he was not as successful as he wanted to be. Jordan purchased 2,222 acres (899 ha) of Brazoria County land from Samuel May Williams. Levi Jordan was married to Sarah (née Stone), together they had one daughter named Emily.

Shortly thereafter, Jordan returned to Arkansas to sell his earlier plantation. He also traveled to Louisiana, where Jordan’s daughter Emily, his son-in-law James Campbell McNeil, and his grandchildren resided, to sell that land so they could all pack up and move to Texas. Jordan wanted to develop a land that would survive many generations and “outlive” him, according to the oral history of the family. During the time that Jordan was traveling back to Arkansas and Louisiana to tie up loose ends, the 12 enslaved people that Jordan took to Texas stayed behind in order to get the land ready for development.

After Jordan’s death in 1873, the land was split between Jordan’s grandsons’ J. C. McNeill and C. P. McNeill, according to his will. Jordan had also purchased one of two sugar plantations formally belonging to the Rowe family, which was also left to his grandsons. His granddaughter Annie McNeil Martin was cut out of the will, and she was not allowed on the property without the permission of Jordan’s wife, Sara Jordan.

== Plantation history ==
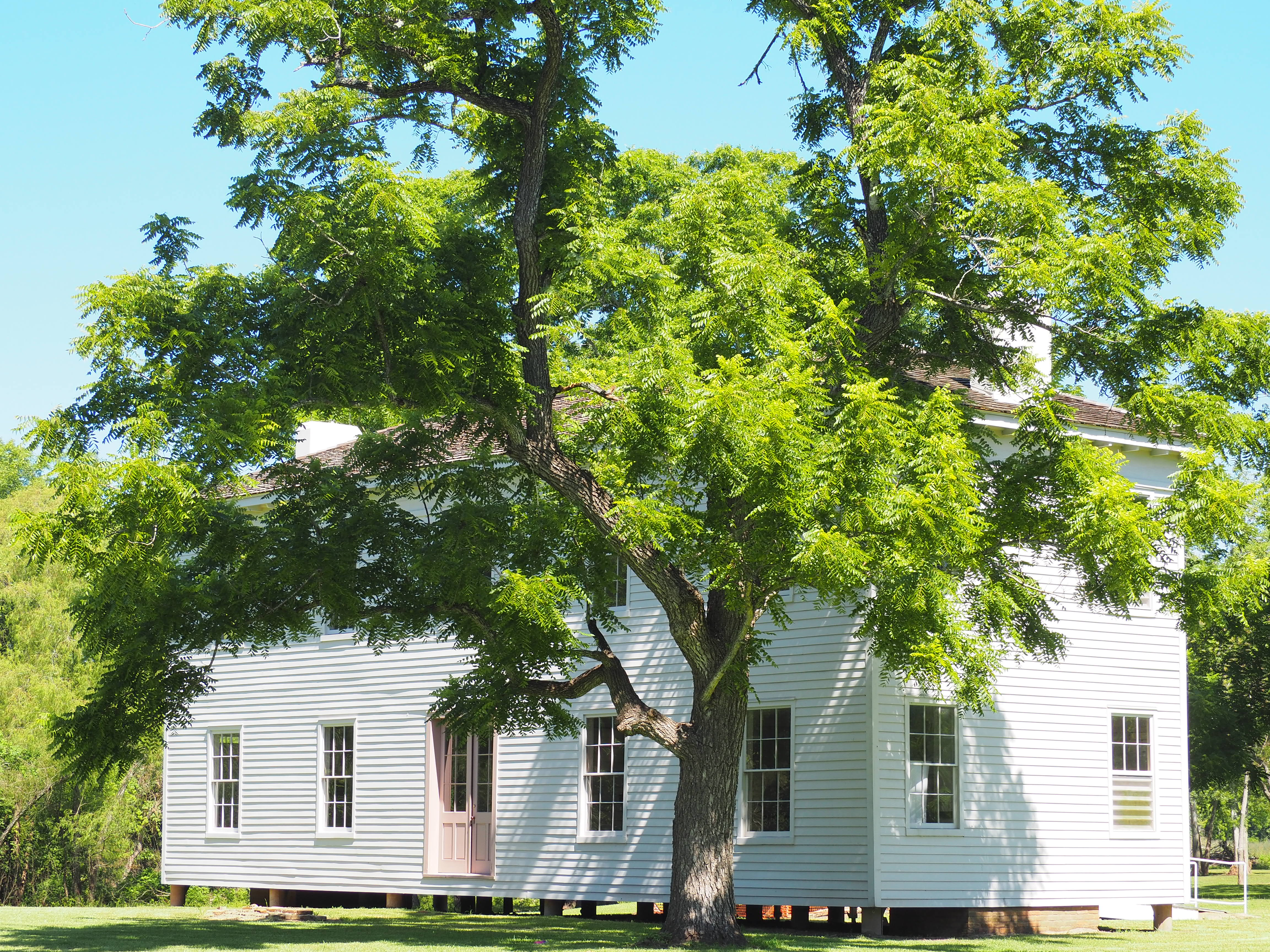
Levi Jordan Plantation (2019)

=== Plantation house ===
The initial construction of the plantation included the new family home, slave quarters, and ancillary buildings. On the property is Jordan's former residence, the Jordan House, is a two story Greek Revival-style plantation house built between 1849 and 1851. The family house was built with yellow long-leaf pine lumber that was imported from Florida. Jordan's enslaved workers hand-hewed the window sills and studs of the house from local oak lumber and they handmade bricks for the fireplaces.

=== Plantation farm ===
Sugar cane was the primary cash crop during the beginning of the plantation. Jordan built the largest sugar factory in Brazoria County, which was used by himself and neighboring planters. Sugar cane cultivation no longer possible at the Levi Jordan Plantation after the end of the American Civil War in 1865 and during the Reconstruction era. Levi Jordan and Levi Jordan's great-grandsons converted the land into a cotton plantation and employed many of the formerly enslaved people and their descendants as sharecroppers, to work and maintain the cotton fields.

=== Slave cabins ===
The cabins first served as slave quarters, and were located northwest of the Jordan House. It is believed that by 1860, Jordan's plantation had more than 130 slaves that had worked there and some had been born in Africa. The cabins were used by workers until 1887, when they were abandoned. The cabins no longer physically exist as buildings, however through archaeological excavation researchers were able to find many of the remnants of former workers and piece together a better understanding of their history. More than 600,000 artifacts have been found on the property.

== Levi Jordan Plantation State Historic Site (2001 – present) ==
The site was owned, until 2001, by several site descendants. The Houston Endowment purchased the 90 acres of the former plantation from Dorothy Cotton and in the spring of 2002, donated it to Texas Parks and Wildlife. Since 2007 the site has been owned and managed by the Texas Historical Commission.

The Levi Jordan Plantation Historical Society, a local advocacy group and 501(c)3 organization, was created in 1993, and its membership includes site descendants and other community members. This group was founded with the assistance of Kenneth L. Brown (the principal archaeological investigator and a University of Houston anthropologist). Carol McDavid, a former graduate student of Kenneth L. Brown, worked with the local community to create a web site about the archaeology.

Texas proposition 8 (in 2003) allowed for the financing of the restoration of the property. Starting in 2012, the plantation house was restored.

== See also ==
- List of Texas State Historic Sites
- Recorded Texas Historic Landmarks in Brazoria County
