= Paul Brown Federal Building and United States Courthouse =

- Sherman US Post Office and Courthouse
- U.S. National Register of Historic Places
- Recorded Texas Historic Landmark
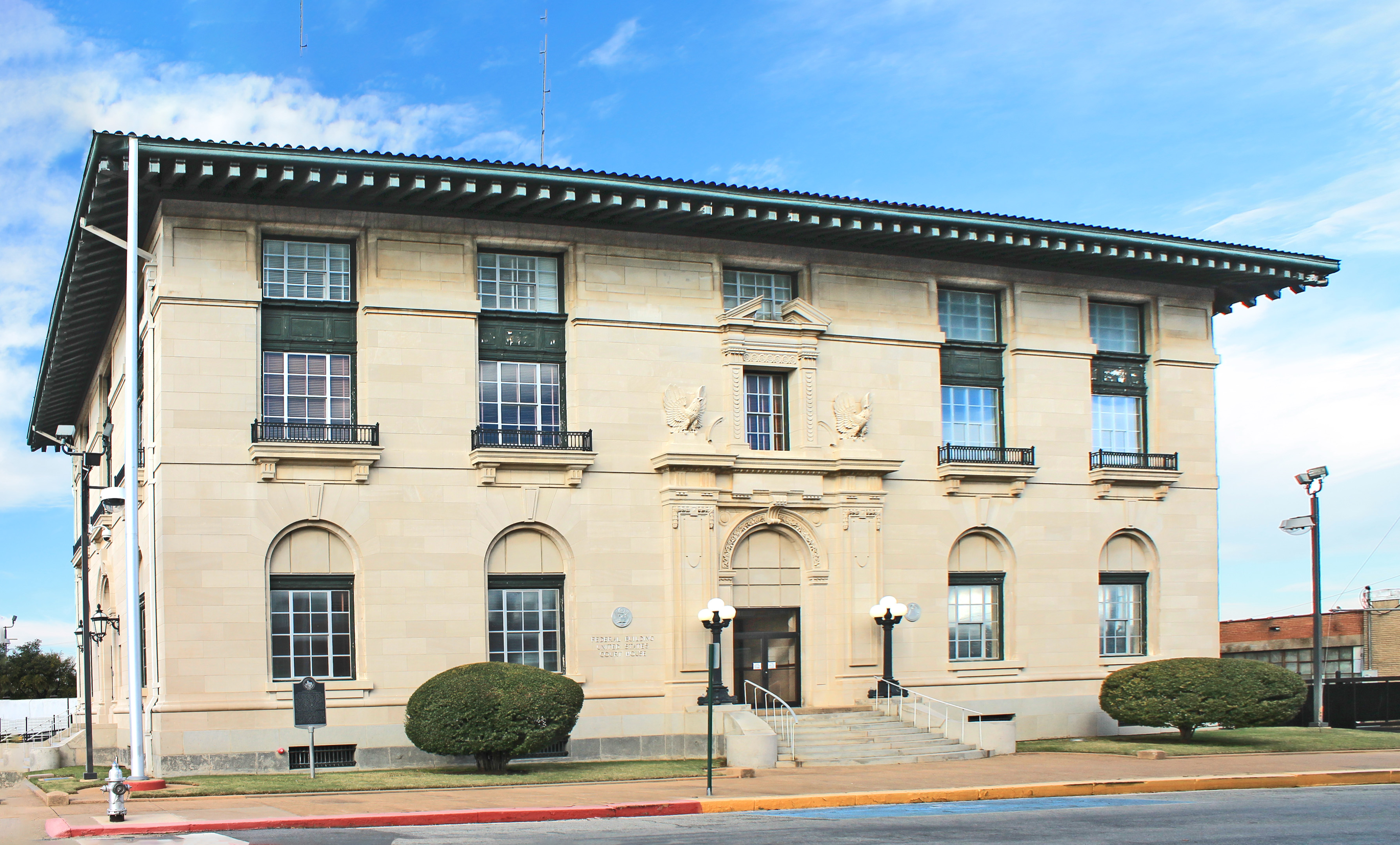
- Sherman federal building and courthouse in 2013

- Location within Texas Location within the United States
- Interactive map showing the location for the Paul Brown Federal Building and United States Courthouse
- Location: 101 E. Pecan St., Sherman, Texas
- Coordinates: 33°38′20″N 96°36′33″W
- Area: 1 acre (0.40 ha)
- Built: 1907
- Built by: F.L. Stevenson Contract Co.
- Architect: James Knox Taylor
- Architectural style: Renaissance
- NRHP reference No.: 00001173
- RTHL No.: 11908

Significant dates
- Added to NRHP: September 29, 2000
- Designated RTHL: 1997

The Paul Brown Federal Building and United States Courthouse, also known as Sherman U.S. Federal Building, is a historic government building in Sherman, Texas. It was built during 1906-1907 and reflects Renaissance Revival architecture. The building was listed on the National Register of Historic Places in 2000 as the US Post Office and Courthouse. It served historically as a post office (until 1962) and continues to serve as a federal courthouse for the United States District Court for the Eastern District of Texas. In 2014, the building was renamed in honor of District Judge Paul Neeley Brown.

It is a three-story limestone-clad building on a granite base with a red clay tiled hipped roof.

== See also ==
- List of United States federal courthouses in Texas
- National Register of Historic Places listings in Grayson County, Texas
- Recorded Texas Historic Landmarks in Grayson County
