= First United Methodist Church (Paris, Texas) =

Historic church in Texas, United States

- U.S. National Register of Historic Places
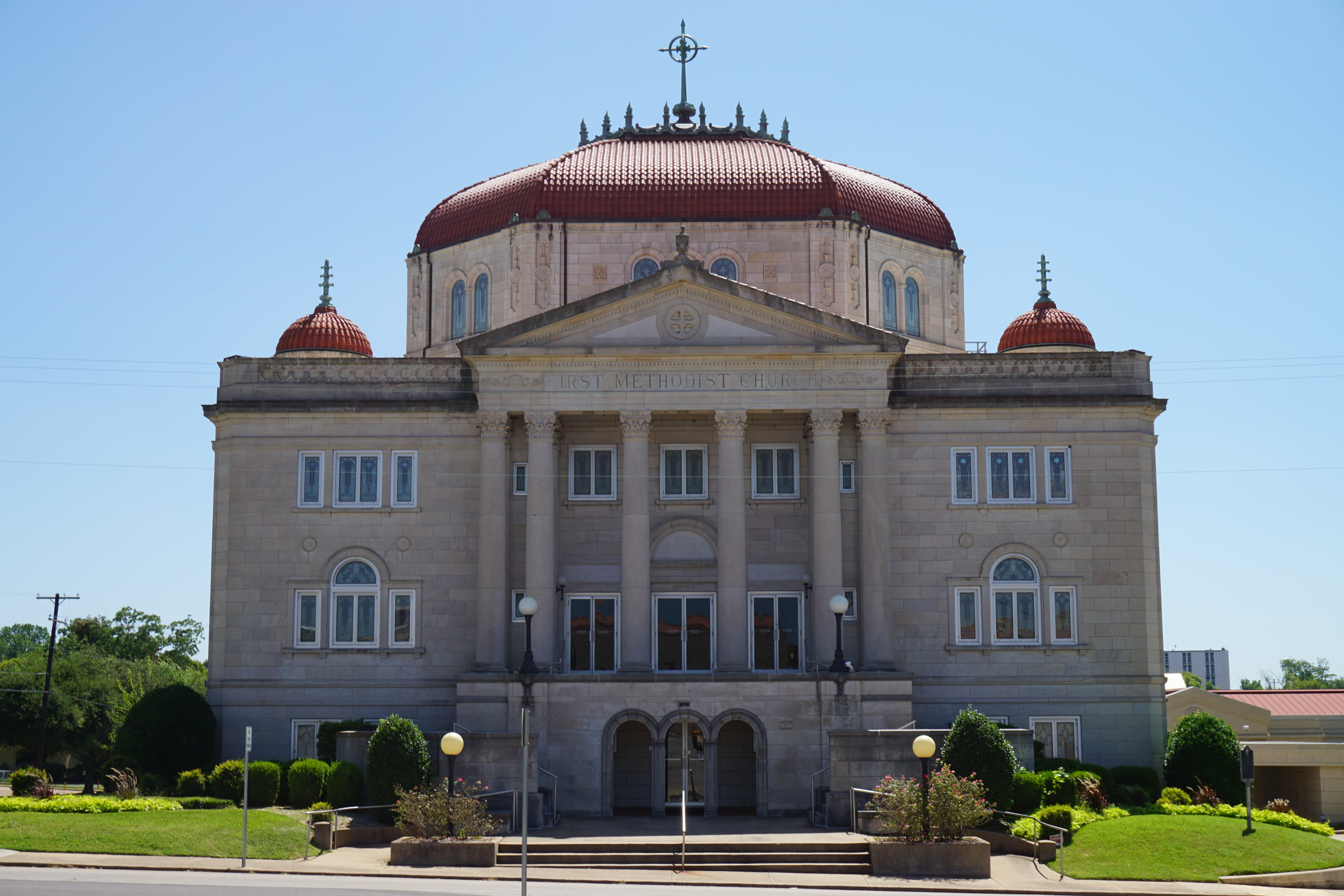
- First United Methodist Church in July 2015

- Location within Texas Location within the United States
- Location: 322 Lamar St., Paris, Texas
- Coordinates: 33°39′33″N 95°32′57″W
- Area: less than one acre
- Built: 1922
- Architect: Vanslyke & Woodruff
- Architectural style: Colonial Revival, Late 19th And 20th Century Revivals, Mediterranean Revival
- MPS: Churches with Decorative Interior Painting TR
- NRHP reference No.: 83003146
- Added to NRHP: June 21, 1983

First United Methodist Church is a historic church at 322 Lamar Street in Paris, Texas.

It was built in 1922 and added to the National Register in 1983.

== See also ==
- National Register of Historic Places listings in Lamar County, Texas
