= Means–Justiss House =

Historic house in Texas, United States

- U.S. National Register of Historic Places
- Location within Texas Location within the United States
- Location: 537 6th St., SE, Paris, Texas
- Coordinates: 33°39′24″N 95°33′1″W
- Area: less than one acre
- Built: 1923
- Architectural style: Bungalow/Craftsman
- MPS: Paris MRA
- NRHP reference No.: 88001934
- Added to NRHP: October 26, 1988

The Means–Justiss House on 6th St., SE, in Paris, Texas is a one-and-a-half-story house that was built in c.1923: by 1926 it replaced a two-story house that was on its location in 1920. It was listed on the National Register of Historic Places in 1988.

It is a "fine" Craftsman bungalow apparently built by Oscar and Mary Means. It was later occupied by Thomas Justiss, supervisor of Paris schools.

== See also ==
- National Register of Historic Places listings in Lamar County, Texas
