= First Presbyterian Church (Paris, Texas) =

Historic church in Texas, United States

- U.S. National Register of Historic Places
- Recorded Texas Historic Landmark
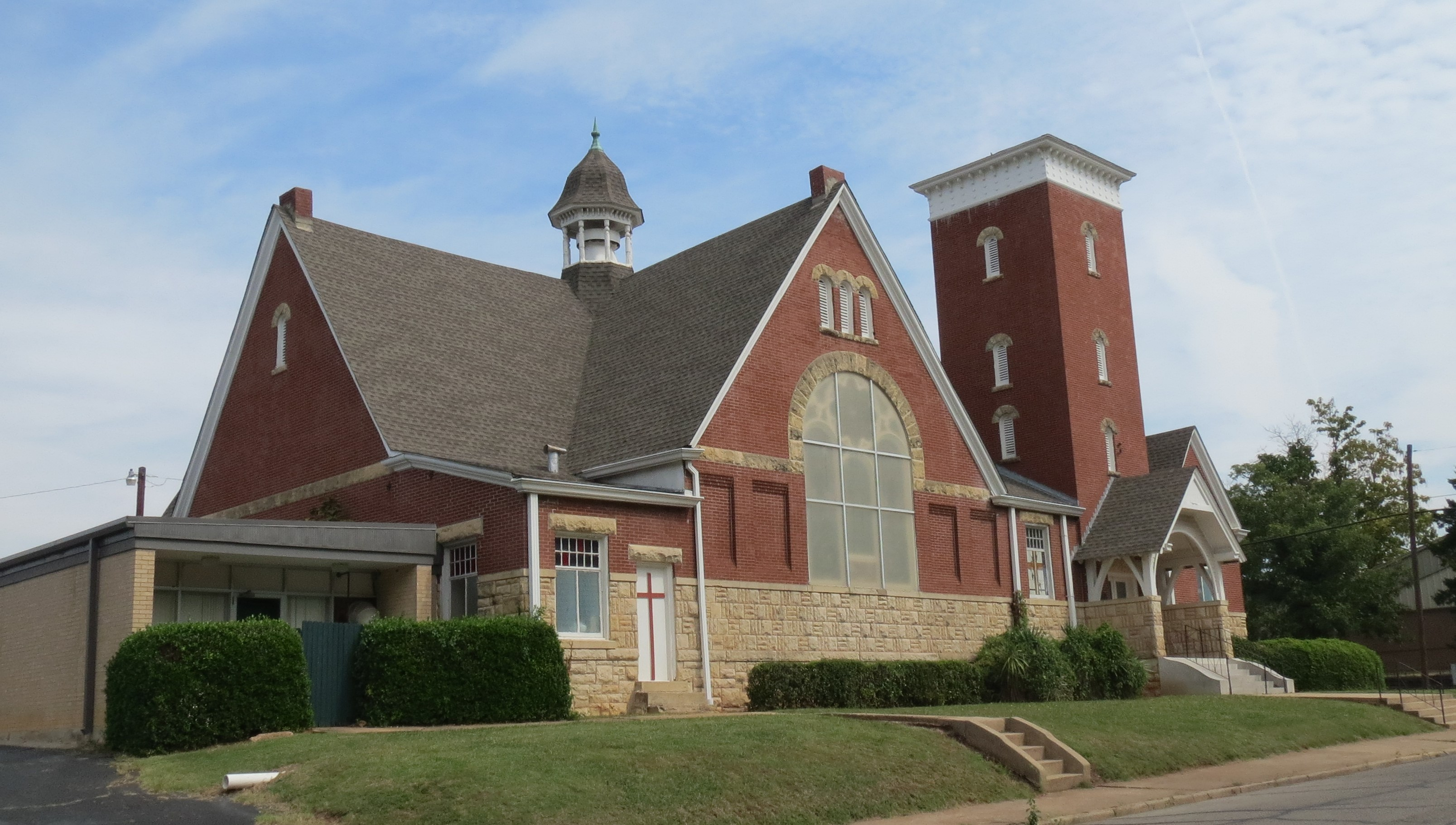
- First Presbyterian Church in 2014

- Location within Texas Location within the United States
- Location: 410 W. Kaufman St., Paris, Texas
- Coordinates: 33°39′36″N 95°33′37″W
- Area: 2.6 acres (1.1 ha)
- Built: 1892
- Architect: L.B. Volk & Son, W.R. Eubanks
- Architectural style: Romanesque, Richardsonian Romanesque
- MPS: Paris MRA
- NRHP reference No.: 88001913
- RTHL No.: 8197

Significant dates
- Added to NRHP: October 26, 1988
- Designated RTHL: 1968

First Presbyterian Church is a historic church at 410 West Kaufman Street in Paris, Texas.

It was built in 1892, and added to the National Register in 1988.

== See also ==
- National Register of Historic Places listings in Lamar County, Texas
- Recorded Texas Historic Landmarks in Lamar County
