= Acton State Historic Site =

State historic site in Texas, United States

Acton State Historic Site Texas State Historic Site
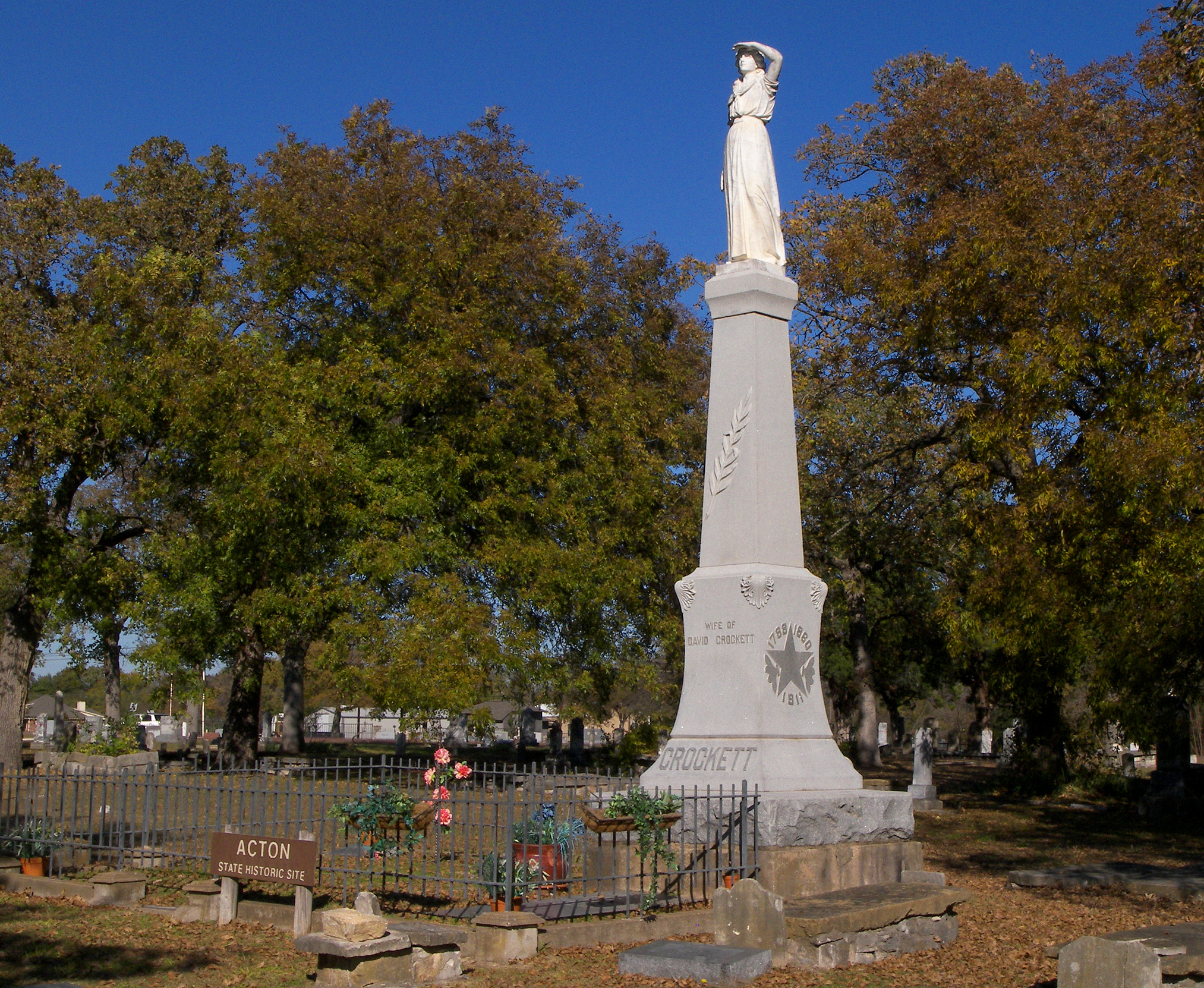
- Acton State Historic Site in 2009

- Location within Texas Location within the United States
- 32°26′24″N 97°41′3″W
- Location: Acton Cemetery, FM 167, Acton, Texas

History
- Designated: 1949
- Built: 1911-1913

Site notes
- Elevation: 745 feet (227 m)
- Area: 0.006 acres (0.0024 ha)
- Governing body: Texas Historical Commission
- Website: Acton State Historic Site

Acton State Historic Site, located near Acton in Hood County, Texas, United States, is the grave site of Elizabeth Crockett (née Patton; May 22, 1788 - January 31, 1860, age 72), second wife of frontiersman and former United States Representative Davy Crockett, who married him in Tennessee in 1815. Davy Crockett died at the Battle of the Alamo in 1836, leaving Elizabeth widowed for the last 24 years of her life. The site also contains the graves of her son Robert and Robert's wife Matilda. The State of Texas erected a monument in 1913 at Acton Cemetery over the grave of Elizabeth Crockett with money authorized by the Texas Legislature in 1911.

On January 1, 2008, Acton State Historic Site was transferred from the Texas Parks and Wildlife Department to the Texas Historical Commission.

The entire site is 12 feet (3.7 m) wide by 21 feet (6.4 m) long, or 0.006 acre (23 m^{2}), making it Texas' smallest historic site.

== See also ==
- List of Texas State Historic Sites
