= First Church of Christ, Scientist (Paris, Texas) =

Historic church in Texas, United States

- U.S. National Register of Historic Places
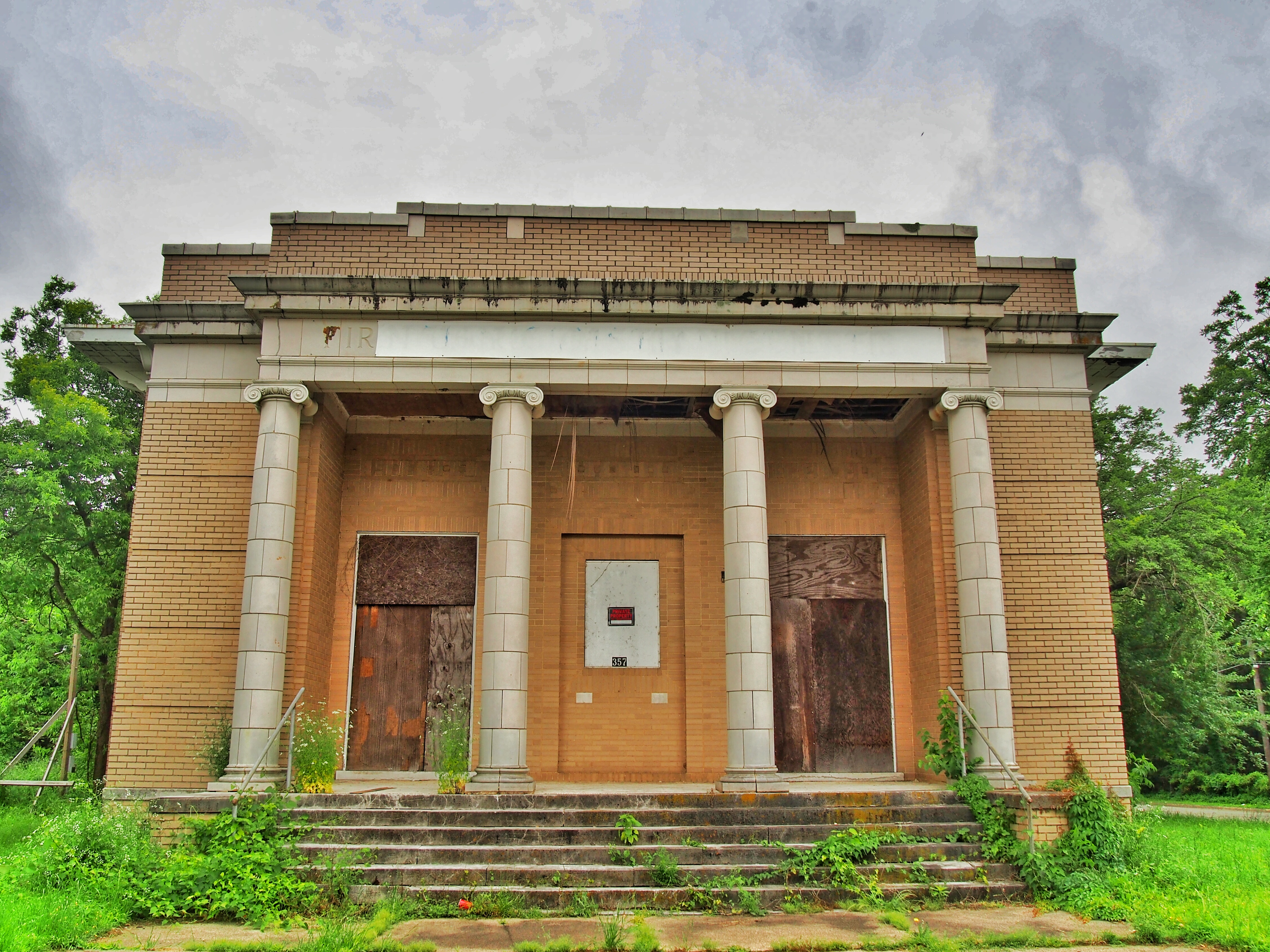
- First Church of Christ, Scientist in 2015

- Location within Texas Location within the United States
- Location: 339 W. Kaufman, Paris, Texas
- Coordinates: 33.65961°N 95.55986°W
- Area: less than 1 acre (4,000 m^{2})
- Built: 1917
- Architectural style: Classical Revival
- MPS: Paris MRA
- NRHP reference No.: 88001912
- Added to NRHP: October 26, 1988

The First Church of Christ, Scientist at 339 West Kaufman in Paris, Texas, is a former Church of Christ, Scientist church and an historic structure that, in 1988, was added to the National Register of Historic Places. It was then vacant. In 2009 it was being used by a Spanish-speaking Baptist congregation.

It is a one-story raised brick building, with broad steps leading up to a portico of Ionic columns and a large entablature. It has double French doors with transoms leading to its sanctuary. The sides have three tall arched windows.

Its nomination suggests it is significant as "one of the earlier Christian Science churches in Texas" and as "one of the first Beaux Arts-style buildings constructed in Paris, Texas after the fire [of 1916], it is an unusually well-detailed small church. It compares favorably with Temple Freda (NR 1984) in Bryan, Brazos County, Texas."

A photo taken in Winter 1984/85 shows that a banner displaying "Ensign Christian Center" appears in the entablature above its front entrance, while the 2015 photo above shows a blank banner obscuring carved letters after "FIR....".

== See also ==
- National Register of Historic Places listings in Lamar County, Texas
- List of former Christian Science churches, societies and buildings
- First Church of Christ, Scientist (disambiguation)
