= Haden House =

- U.S. National Register of Historic Places
- Recorded Texas Historic Landmark
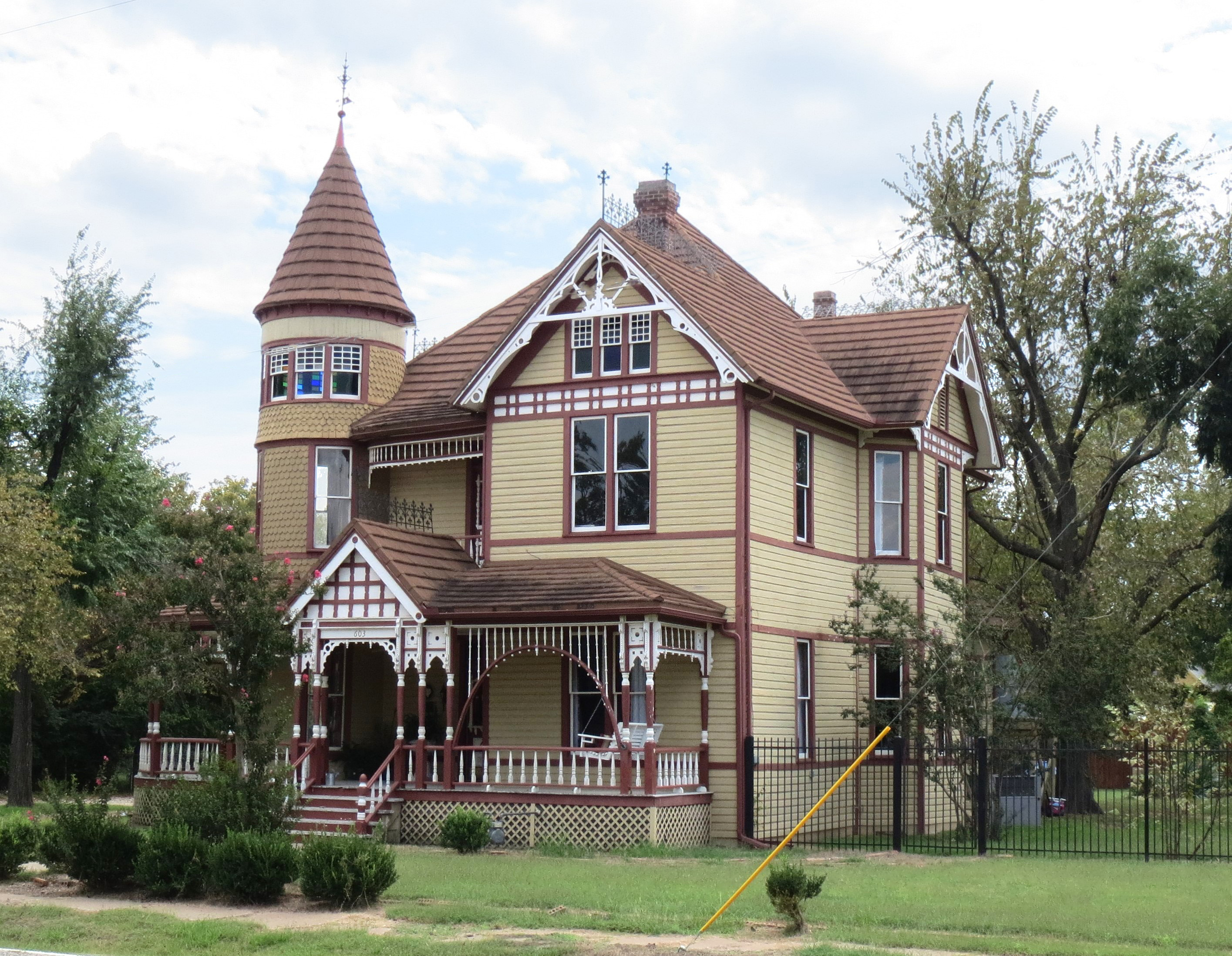
- The house in 2014
- Location: Ladonia, Texas
- Built: 1894
- Architectural style: Late Victorian
- NRHP reference No.: 80004118

Significant dates
- Added to NRHP: 8 January 1980
- Designated RTHL: 1966

Haden House is a historic house located in Ladonia, Texas. The house was built in 1894 for J. B. Haden. In 1963, the Haden family sold the home. The home is well-preserved, retaining its detailed woodwork, stained-glass windows, and many of its original furnishings.
