= Acton, Texas =

Unincorporated community in Texas, US

Coordinates: 32°26′49″N 97°41′25″W

Acton is an unincorporated community located about 7 mi (11 km) due east of Granbury on the Brazos River in Hood County, Texas, United States. Acton was formerly called Commanche Peak and was later renamed to Acton, possibly after the Old English word meaning "oak town", a reference to the large stands of oak trees in the vicinity.

It is the home of Acton State Historic Site, which is the burial site of Elizabeth Crockett, second wife of Davy Crockett. The site consists of 0.006 acres (24 m^{2}), which makes it the smallest state historical site in Texas (previously the smallest state park, until the Texas Parks and Wildlife Department transferred management of all its historical sites to the Texas Historical Commission). The Acton Nature Center of Hood County is open to anyone who enjoys the peace and quiet of nature at its finest. Hiking and bike trails lead one around the center's 80-acre (0.32 km^{2}) park.

Acton is part of the Granbury, Texas micropolitan statistical area.

In 1990, the population was about 450 people.
