= Eisenhower State Park (Texas) =

State park in Texas, United States

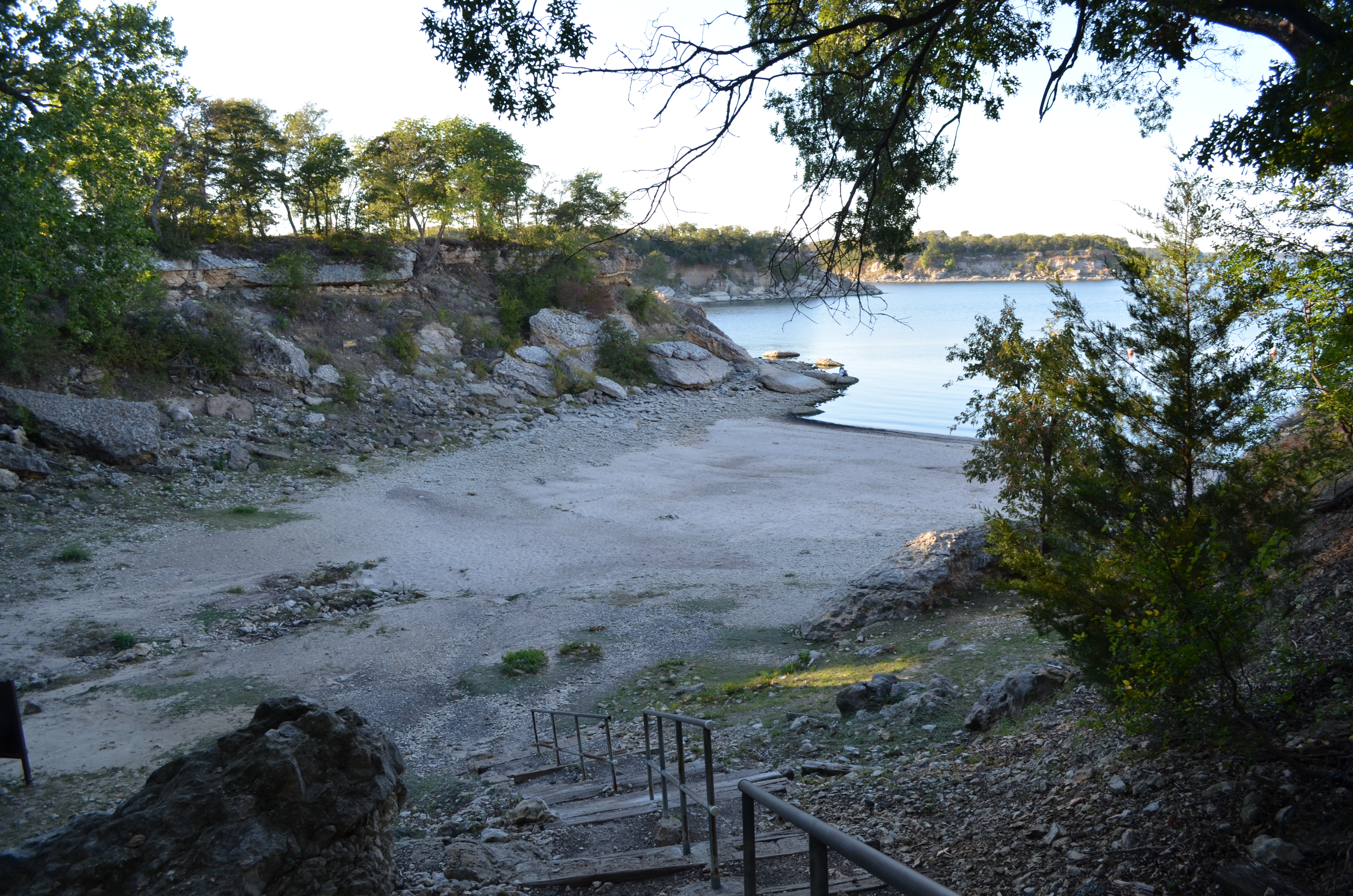
- Lake Texoma, Eisenhower State Park

- Location within Texas Location within the United States
- Location: Grayson County, Texas
- Nearest city: Denison, Texas
- Coordinates: 33°49′12″N 96°36′46″W
- Area: 423.1 acres (171 ha)
- Created: 1954
- Named for: Dwight D. Eisenhower
- Visitors: 133,811 (in 2025)
- Governing body: Texas Parks and Wildlife Department
- Website: Official site

Eisenhower State Park is a 423.1 acres (171 ha) state park located on the shores of Lake Texoma northwest of Denison, Texas in Grayson County, Texas, United States. The park is named for the 34th U.S. president, Dwight D. Eisenhower, who was born in Denison. The park opened in 1958 and is managed by the Texas Parks and Wildlife Department.

== History ==
In the early 1830s, the area was important to Anglo settlers, particularly as a route to Texas and the American southwest. It was also an area of cattle trails.

The park was acquired in 1954 by a United States Department of the Army lease. The park opened to the public in 1958.

== Recreation ==
The park offers nature programs throughout the year. The park has facilities for camping, picnicking, nature study, hiking, biking, fishing, swimming, boating, water skiing, wildlife observation, and all-terrain vehicle (ATV) use. Facilities at the park are picnic sites, playground areas, campsites, screened shelters, recreation hall, a campground pavilion, boat dock, an amphitheater, a lighted fishing pier, an ATV/mini bike area of 10 acres (40,000 m^{2}), and 4.5 miles (7.2 km) of hike and bike trails.

Also located within the park is the Eisenhower Yacht Club, a privately operated full-service marina.

== Nature ==
=== Animals ===
Mammals at the park include Mexican long-nosed armadillo, coyote, white-tailed deer, gray fox, Virginia opossum, eastern cottontail, common raccoon, striped skunk, and eastern fox squirrel. Wintering bald eagle, American white pelican, common loon, and other waterfowl may be observed in the area. Lake fishing offers a variety of bass including largemouth bass and smallmouth bass , bluegill, and channel catfish.

=== Plants ===
A wide variety of trees grow in the park including Shumard oak, post oak, cedar elm, eastern redcedar, roughleaf dogwood, western soapberry, honey locust, and Osage-orange. Several varieties of wildflowers such as Texas bluebonnet, Texas thistle, Texas paintbrush, meadow pink, American basketflower, and Maximilian sunflower also grow in the park.

== See also ==
- List of Texas state parks
- Eisenhower Birthplace State Historic Site
- Eisenhower State Park (Kansas)
