= Sam Rayburn House Museum =

Historic house in Texas, United States

- Samuel T. Rayburn House
- U.S. National Register of Historic Places
- U.S. National Historic Landmark
- Texas State Historic Site
- Texas State Antiquities Landmark
- Recorded Texas Historic Landmark
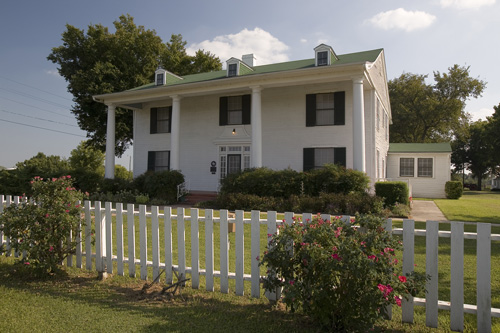
- Sam Rayburn House Museum in 2009

- Location within Texas Location within the United States
- Interactive map showing the location of Samuel T. Rayburn House Museum
- Location: 890 W. SH 56, Bonham, Texas
- Coordinates: 33°34′11″N 96°12′26″W
- Area: 2.5 acres (1.0 ha)
- Built: 1916
- Architect: W.B. Yarborough
- NRHP reference No.: 72001361
- TSAL No.: 8200000738
- RTHL No.: 8923

Significant dates
- Added to NRHP: June 5, 1972
- Designated NHL: May 11, 1976
- Designated TSHS: 1975
- Designated TSAL: January 1, 2000
- Designated RTHL: 1965

The Sam Rayburn House Museum is a historic house museum at 890 West Texas State Highway 56 just outside Bonham, Fannin, Texas. Built in 1916, it was home to Sam Rayburn (1882-1961), a famously effective Speaker of the United States House of Representatives. It was declared a National Historic Landmark in 1976. Since 1972, it has been operated as a museum and state historic site by the Texas Historical Commission.

== Description and history ==
The Sam Rayburn House is located on about 2 acres (0.81 ha) on the south side of Texas Highway 56, on the western outskirts of Bonham. The property includes the main house, a storage building, shed, garage, wellhouse, and barn. The main house is a 2 1/2-story wood-frame structure, with a gabled roof and clapboarded exterior. Its main facade is protected by a shed-roof portico with two-story Tuscan columns, and there are three gabled dormers projecting from the roof. The facade is three bays wide, with a center entrance framed by sidelight and transom windows, topped by a projecting cornice.

The house was originally thought to be built around 1904, before the Rayburn family purchased the property. Subsequent research later determined the date to be 1916, since Sam Rayburn's brother Tom took a lien on the property without the house on it. As originally built, the house was smaller and had a hip roof; its present configuration is the result of a major expansion commissioned by Rayburn from Dallas architect W.B. Yarborough. Rayburn occupied the house until his death in 1961. Since he died divorced and childless, his sister lived there until her death in 1969, after which it was taken over by the Sam Rayburn Foundation. In 1972, the foundation turned most of the property (excepting only the barn) to the state for preservation. All the furnishings are original and remain as they were when the Rayburns lived there. Rayburn's 1947 Cadillac is also on site.

Rayburn was one of the most influential Congressmen of the first half of the 20th century, serving for 17 years as the Speaker of the United States House of Representatives. He was an important force in maintaining harmony between the northern and southern wings of the Democratic Party, and served as a mentor to future president Lyndon B. Johnson. Of three residences known to be associated with Rayburn, this one is the best preserved and most evocative of his life.

== Gallery ==
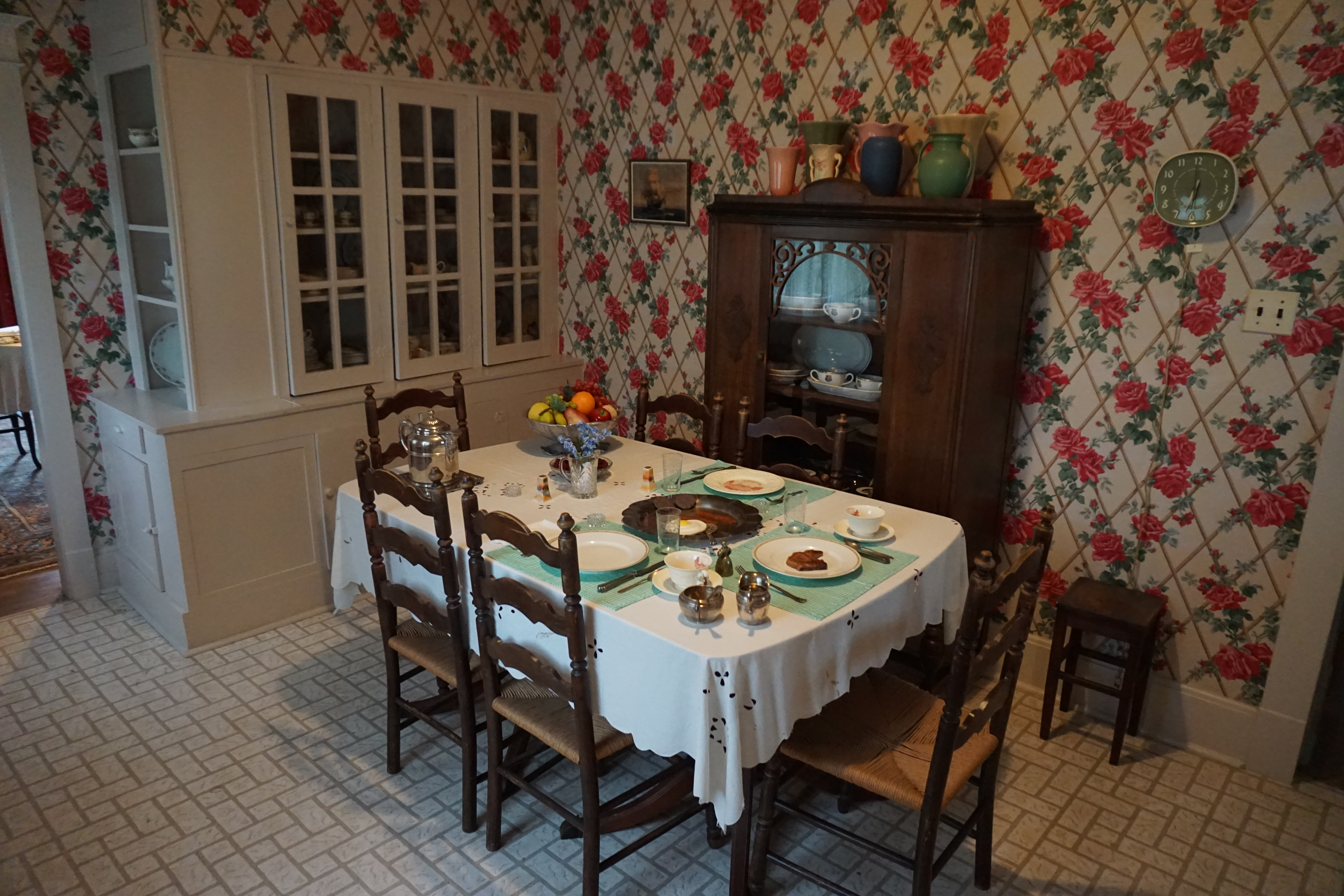
Dining area

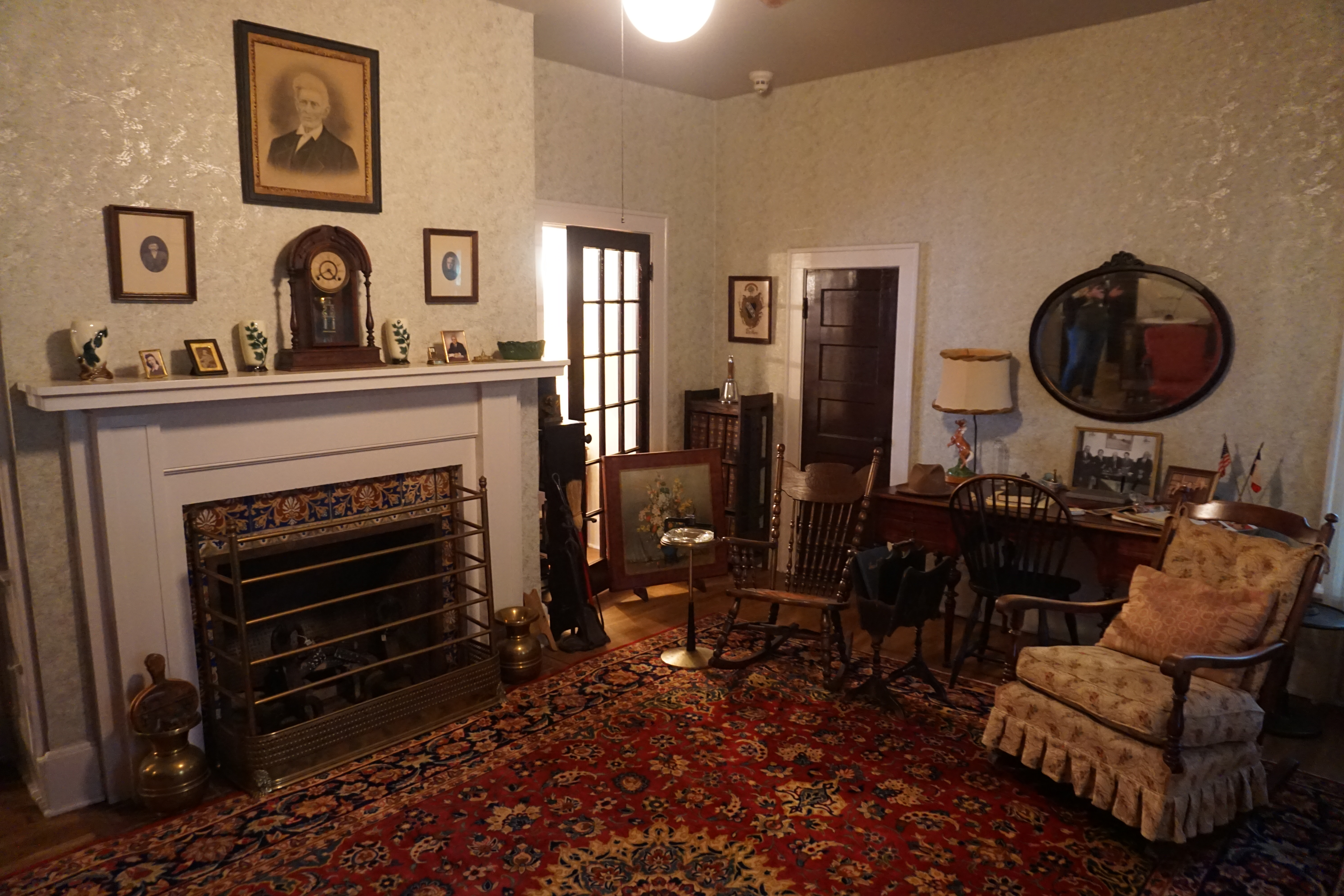
Family room

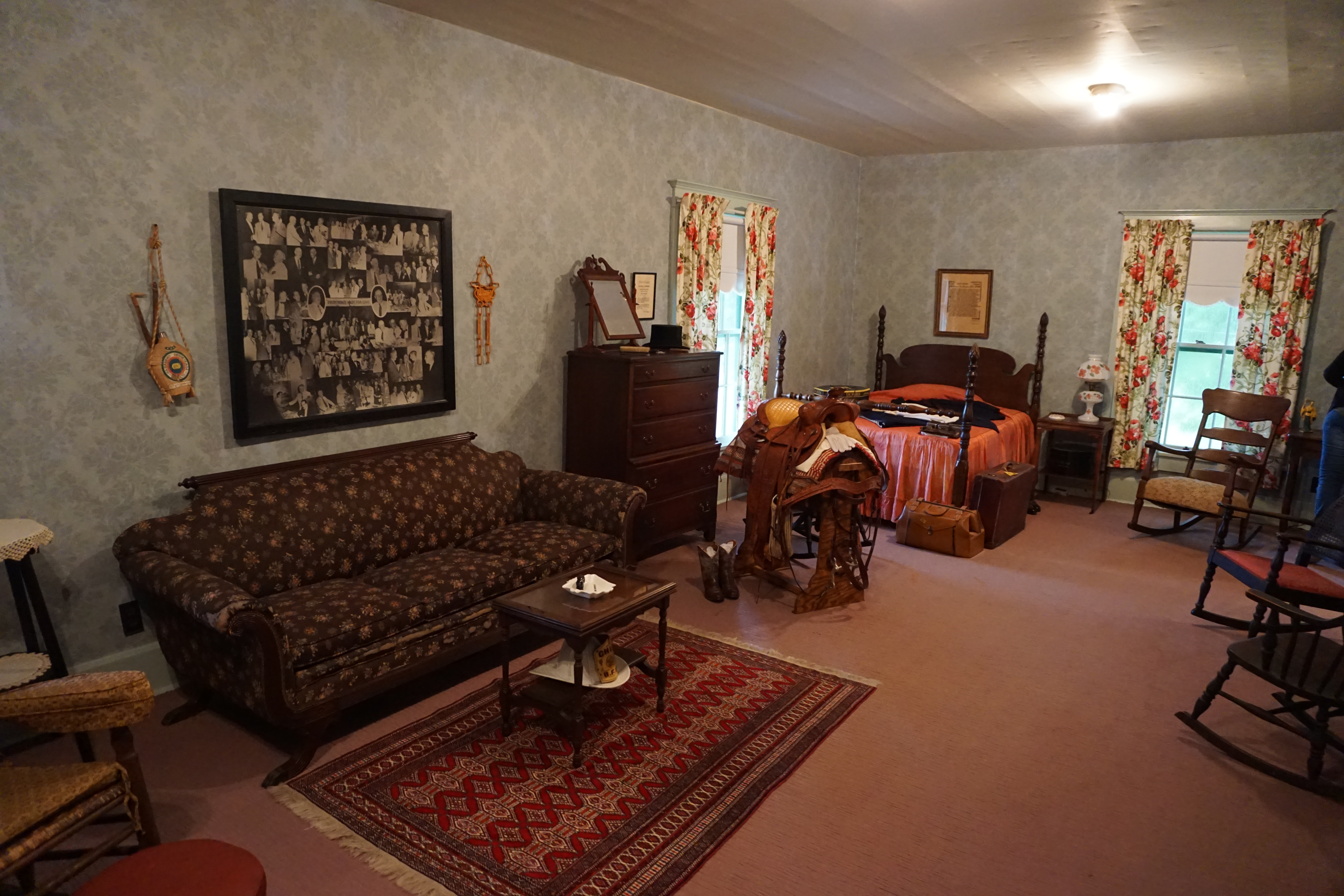
Sam Rayburn's bedroom

== See also ==
- List of National Historic Landmarks in Texas
- National Register of Historic Places listings in Fannin County, Texas
- List of Texas State Historic Sites
- Recorded Texas Historic Landmarks in Fannin County
