= Eisenhower Birthplace State Historic Site =

- Eisenhower Birthplace
- U.S. National Register of Historic Places
- Texas State Historic Site
- Recorded Texas Historic Landmark
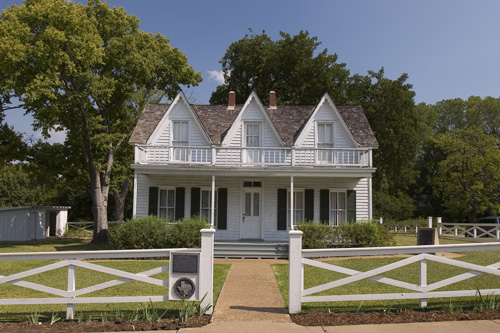
- Eisenhower Birthplace State Historic Site in 2009

- Location within Texas Location within the United States
- Interactive map showing Eisenhower Birthplace’s location
- Location: 720 S. Lamar; Denison, Texas
- Coordinates: 33°44′54″N 96°32′1″W
- Area: 0.35 acres (0.14 ha)
- Built: circa 1877
- Architectural style: Carpenter Gothic
- Website: Eisenhower Birthplace State Historic Site
- NRHP reference No.: 16000718
- RTHL No.: 7359

Significant dates
- Added to NRHP: October 11, 2016
- Designated TSHS: 1958
- Designated RTHL: 1962

The Eisenhower Birthplace State Historic Site is located at 609 S. Lamar Avenue in Denison, Grayson County, in the U.S. state of Texas. President Dwight D. Eisenhower was born in the house on October 14, 1890, making him the first president of the United States to be born in Texas.

== Background ==
Eisenhower's military success as Supreme Allied Commander Europe during World War II prompted local Denison school principal Jennie Jackson to correspond with General Eisenhower. She inquired if he was from the Eisenhower family she remembered in Denison. His family had moved to Kansas when he was two years old, and until he received Jackson's letter, he was unaware he had been born in Denison. Eisenhower's mother Ida Elizabeth Stover was still alive at the time, and he put his mother in touch with Jackson. Upon hearing from Eisenhower's mother that this was indeed his birthplace, Jackson set about to raise funds to purchase the two-story frame house. After the purchase, the house was then donated to the city of Denison, Texas. The museum was established in 1955. After Eisenhower was elected President, the Eisenhower Foundation was formed in 1953 for restoration. The Foundation created a park by removing several other houses in the nearby vicinity, and doing landscaping improvements. In 1958, the restored home and surrounding park was donated to the State Parks Board. On January 1, 2008, the Eisenhower Birthplace was transferred from the Texas Parks and Wildlife Department to the Texas Historical Commission.

The home was designated a Recorded Texas Historic Landmark in 1962.

== Gallery ==
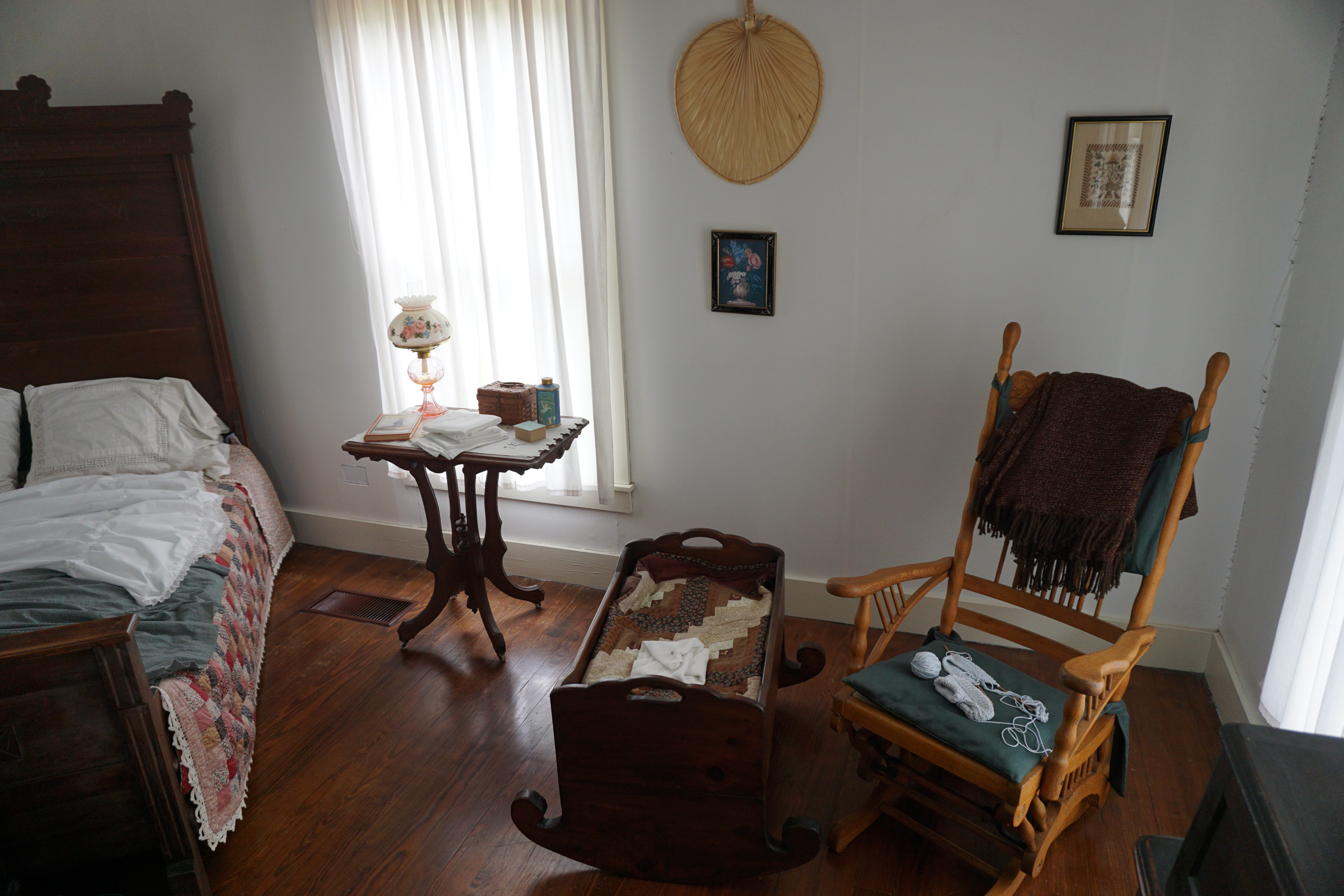
Downstairs bedroom

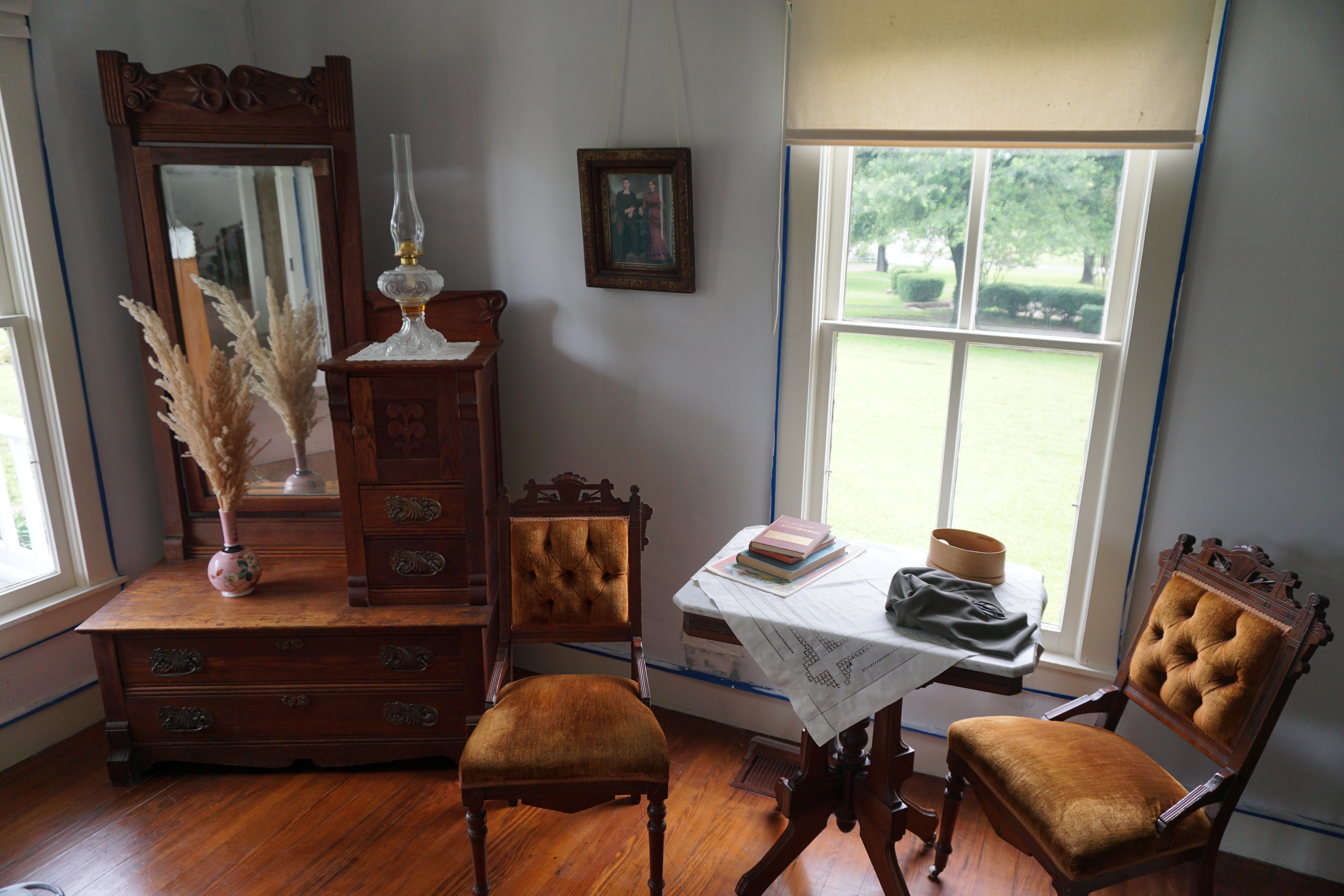
Parlor

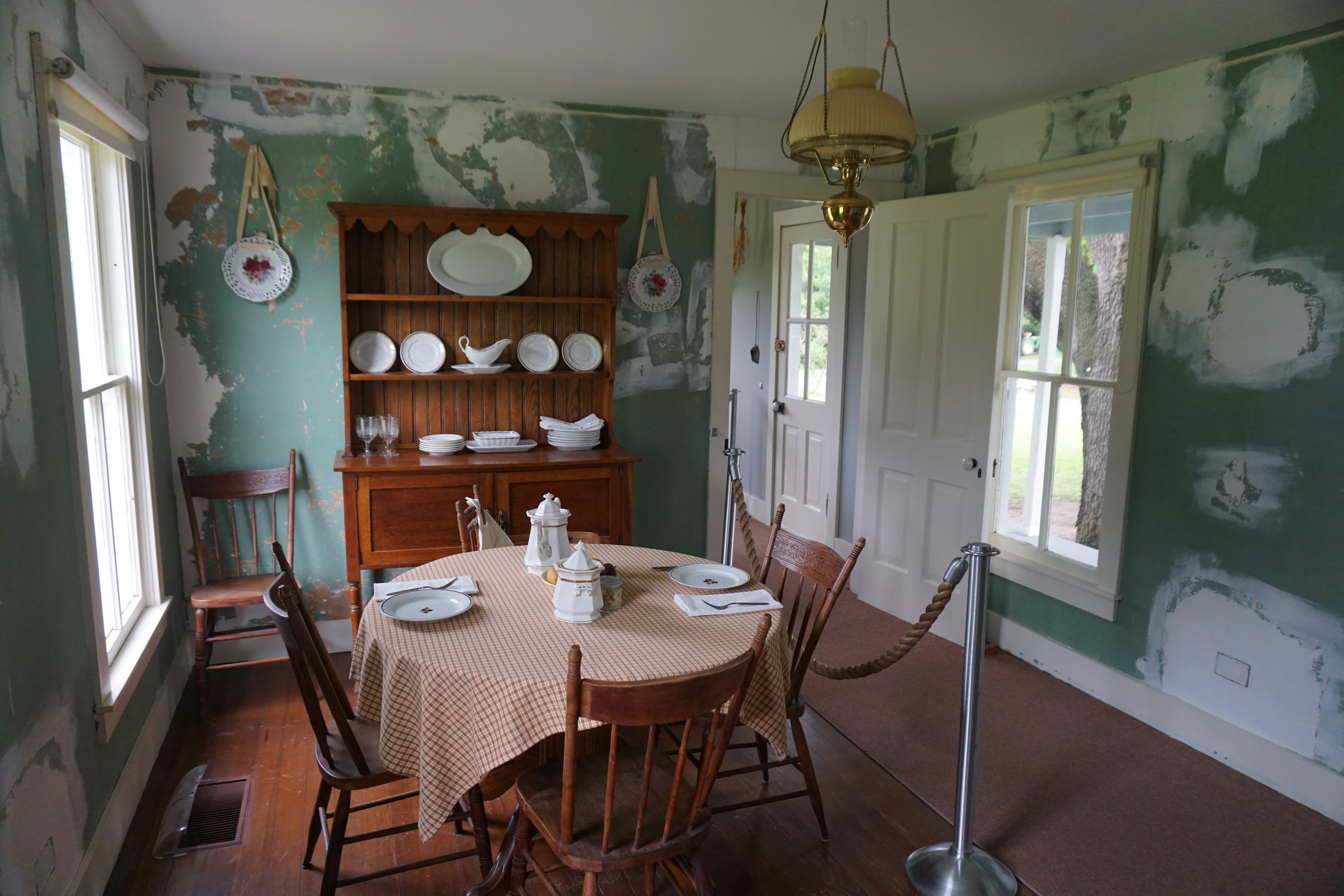
Dining area

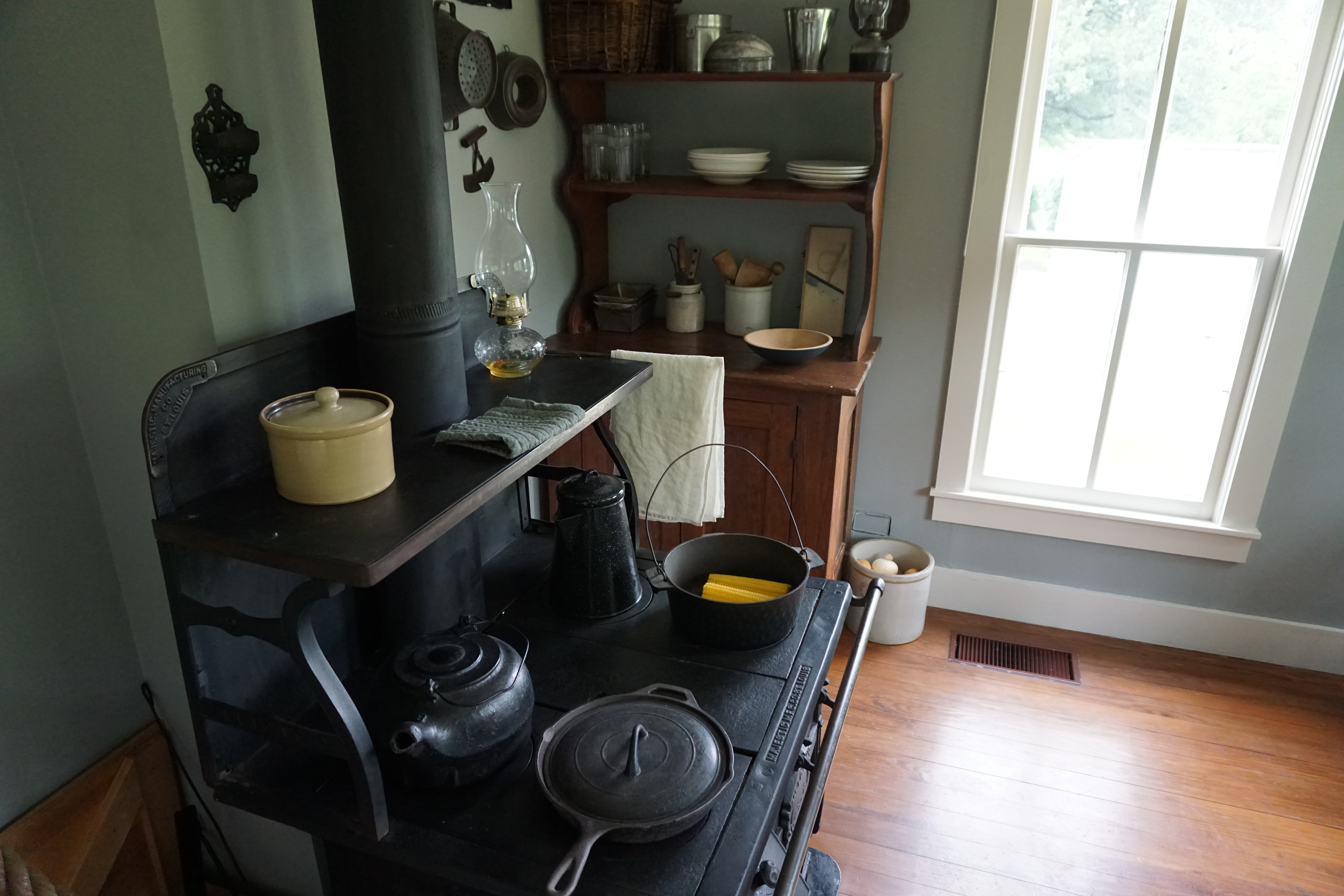
Kitchen

== See also ==
- List of residences of presidents of the United States
- List of Texas state historic sites
- National Register of Historic Places listings in Grayson County, Texas
- Recorded Texas Historic Landmarks in Grayson County
- Museums in North Texas
- Eisenhower State Park (Texas)
