= Sam Bell Maxey House =

Historic house in Texas, United States

Coordinates: 33.6539°N 95.5550°W

- Samuel Bell Maxey House
- U.S. National Register of Historic Places
- Texas State Historic Site
- Texas State Antiquities Landmark
- Recorded Texas Historic Landmark
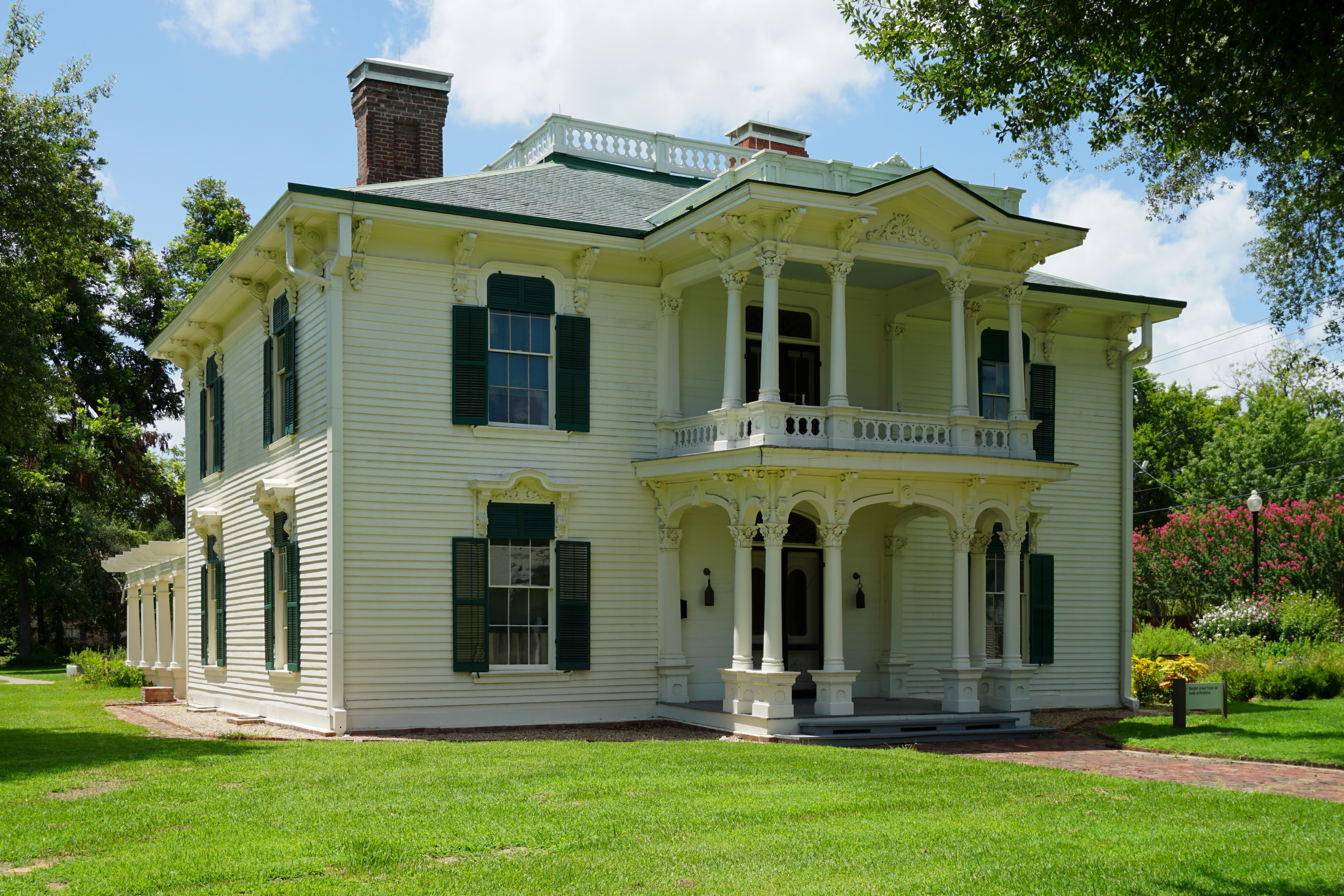
- Sam Bell Maxey House in 2015

- Location within Texas Location within the United States
- Location: 812 E. Church St. Paris, Texas
- Area: 1.8 acres (0.73 ha)
- Built: 1867
- Architectural style: Palladian
- Website: Sam Bell Maxey House State Historic Site
- NRHP reference No.: 71000943
- TSAL No.: 8200000426
- RTHL No.: 8208

Significant dates
- Added to NRHP: March 18, 1971
- Designated TSHS: April 1976
- Designated TSAL: January 1, 1983
- Designated RTHL: 1962

The Sam Bell Maxey House is a historic house in Paris, Lamar County, Texas. Samuel Bell Maxey, a prominent local attorney and later two-term U.S. senator, built the large two-story house after serving as a major general in the Confederate Army. It is built in the High Victorian Italianate style.

From 1868 to 1966, the house was the home of Samuel B. Maxey and his family. It was added to the National Register of Historic Places listings in Lamar County, Texas on March 18, 1971. The house was designated a Recorded Texas Historic Landmark in 1962. Restoration was completed September 1, 1980, and it was opened to the public on a tour basis. On January 1, 2008, the house was transferred from the Texas Parks and Wildlife Department to the Texas Historical Commission and is now operated at the Sam Bell Maxey House State Historic Site.

== Gallery ==
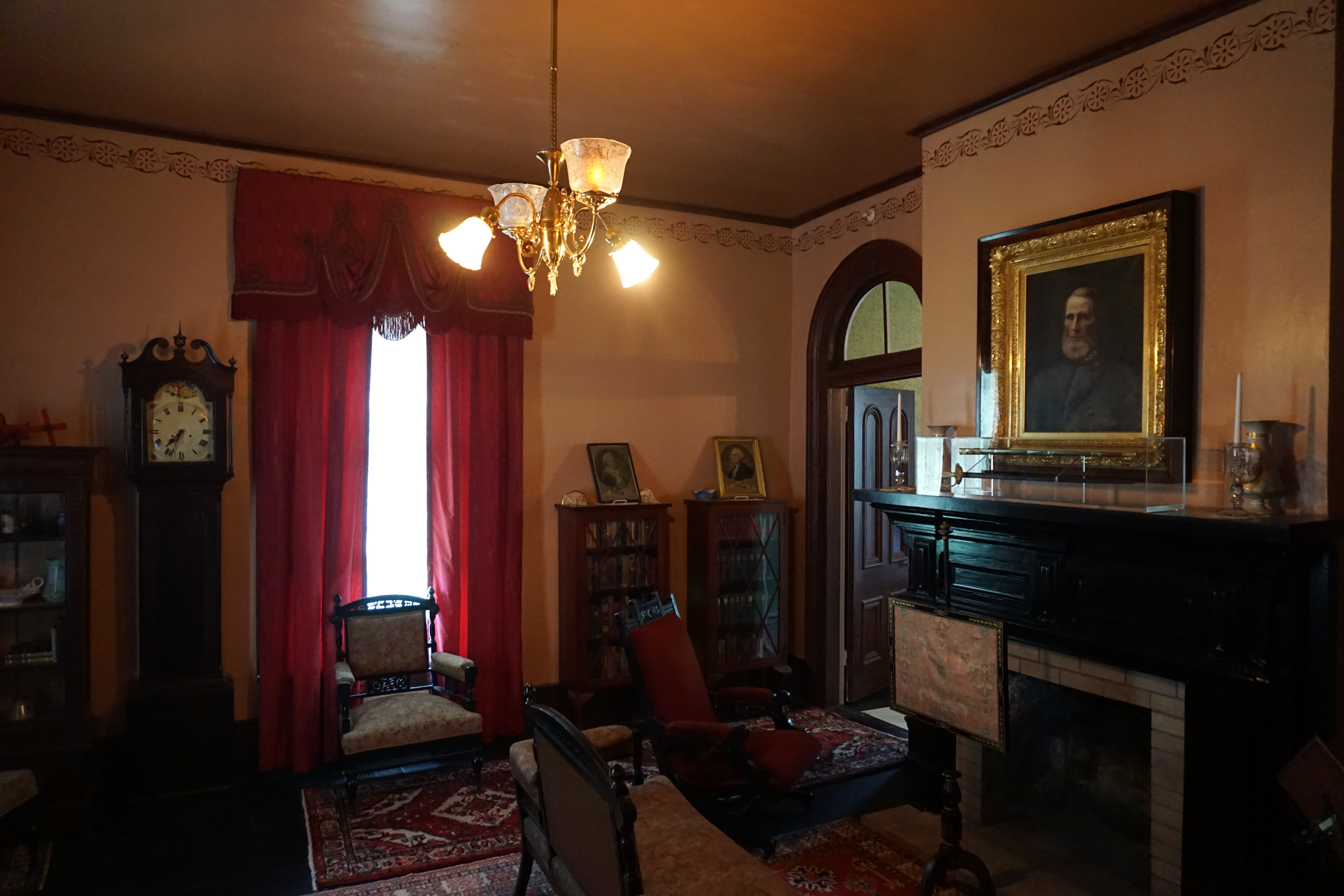
Library

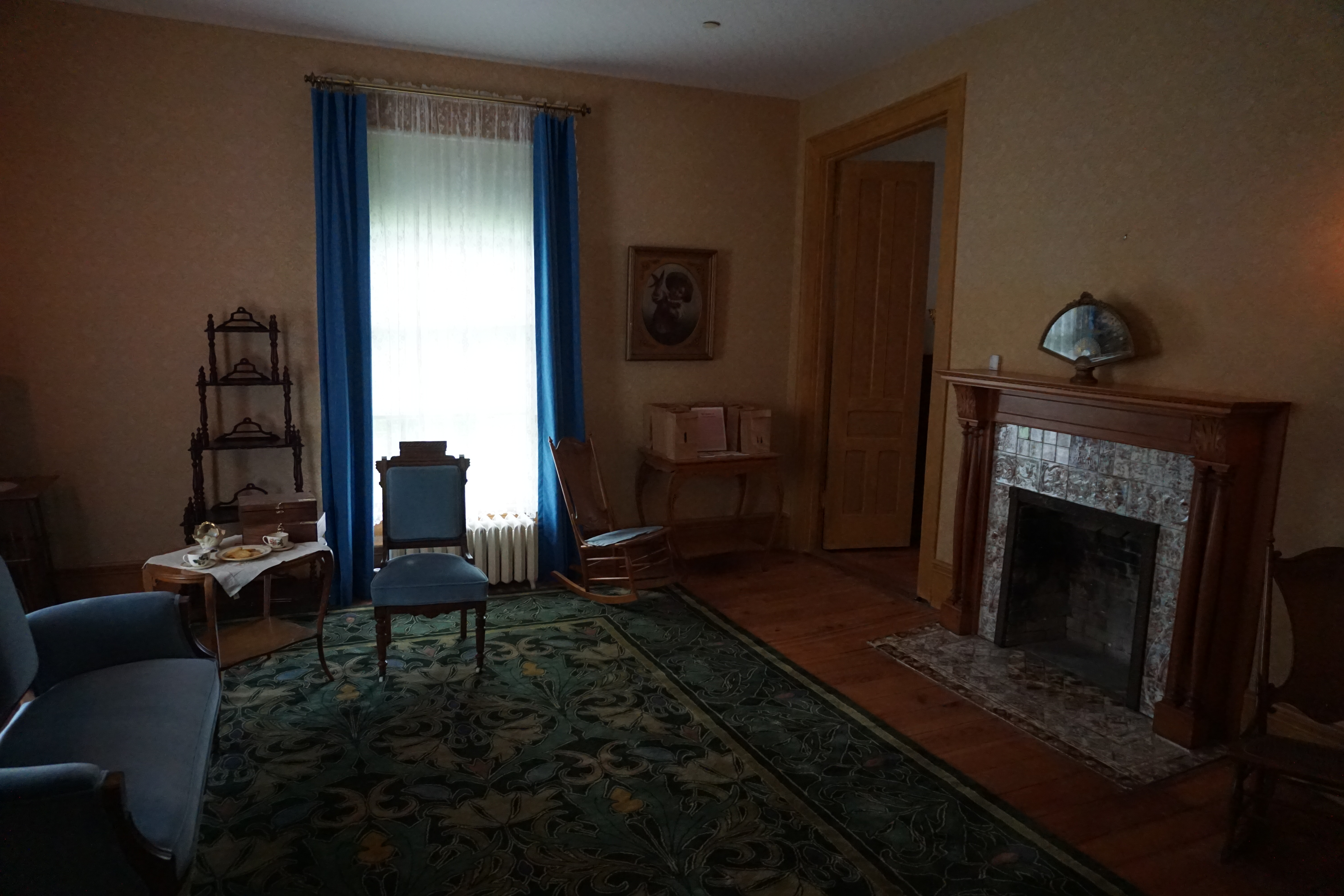
Longs' sitting room

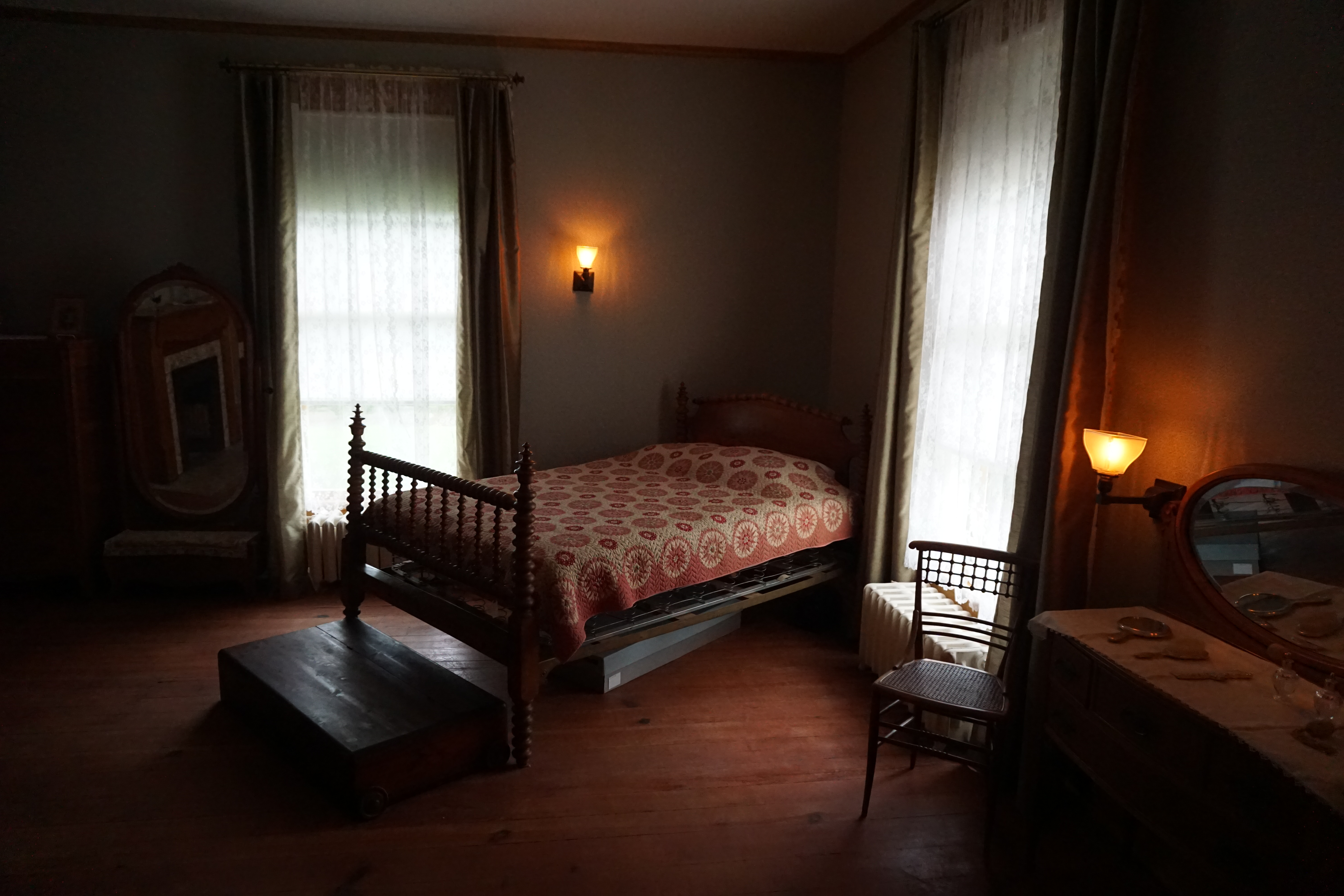
Longs' bedroom

== See also ==
- National Register of Historic Places listings in Lamar County, Texas
- List of Texas state historic sites
- Recorded Texas Historic Landmarks in Lamar County
