= List of Texas State Historic Sites =

Official historic sites of the state of Texas may be under the supervision of the Texas Parks and Wildlife Department (TPWD) or the Texas Historical Commission (THC).

Key

Sites with multiple historic designations are colored according to their highest designation within the following hierarchy.

#National Historic Landmark (NHL)
†National Register of Historic Places (NRHP)
‡NRHP Historic District (HD)
⁂NRHP HD contributing property
⁕State Antiquities Landmark
⁑Recorded Texas Historic Landmark

Historic site	Image	Location	Nearest city	County	Coordinates	Supervising agency	Notes
Acton State Historic Site		FM 167	Acton	Hood	32°26′25″N 97°41′5″W	THC	
Barrington Living History Farm State Historic Site		Park Road 12	Washington-on-the-Brazos	Washington	30°19′21″N 96°9′0″W	THC	
Bush Family Home State Historic Site#⁑	More images	1412 W. Ohio St.	Midland	Midland	32°0′2″N 102°5′24″W	THC	
Caddo Mounds State Historic Site†	More images	1649 W. SH 21	Alto	Cherokee	31°35′47″N 95°8′55″W	THC	
Casa Navarro State Historic Site#†⁕⁑		228 S. Laredo St.	San Antonio	Bexar	29°25′23″N 98°29′51″W	THC	
Confederate Reunion Grounds State Historic Site†	More images	1738 FM 2705	Mexia	Limestone	31°38′1″N 96°33′26″W	THC	
Eisenhower Birthplace State Historic Site†⁑	More images	609 S. Lamar Ave.	Denison	Grayson	33°44′59″N 96°32′3″W	THC	
Fannin Battleground State Historic Site‡	More images	734 FM 2506	Fannin	Goliad	28°41′11″N 97°14′2″W	THC	
Fanthorp Inn State Historic Site⁂⁕	More images	579 S. Main St.	Anderson	Grimes	30°28′59″N 95°59′2″W	THC	Part of Anderson Historic District
First Capitol of Texas State Historic Site		200 N. 14th St.	West Columbia	Brazoria	29°8′40″N 95°38′33″W	THC	
Fort Griffin State Historic Site†⁕	More images	1701 N. US 283	Albany	Jones	32°55′11″N 99°13′45″W	THC	
Fort Lancaster and Battlefield State Historic Site†⁕	More images	629 Ft. Lancaster Rd.	Sheffield	Pecos	30°39′34″N 101°41′36″W	THC	
Fort Leaton State Historic Site†⁕	More images	FM 170 E.	Presidio	Presidio	29°32′33″N 104°19′37″W	TPWD	
Fort Martin Scott State Historic Site	More images	1606 E. Main St.	Fredericksburg	Gillespie	30°14′58″N 98°50′47″W	THC	
Fort McKavett State Historic Site‡	More images	7066 FM 864	Fort McKavett	Menard	30°49′28″N 100°6′38″W	THC	
Fort Richardson State Park and Historic Site#†⁕⁑	More images	228 Park Road 61	Jacksboro	Jack	33°12′22″N 98°9′25″W	TPWD	
French Legation State Historic Site†⁕⁑	French legation 2011	802 San Marcos St.	Austin	Travis	30°16′01″N 97°43′56″W	THC	
Fulton Mansion State Historic Site†⁕⁑	More images	317 S. Fulton Beach Rd.	Rockport	Aransas	28°3′25″N 97°2′7″W	THC	
Goliad State Park and Historic Site‡⁕⁑	More images	108 Park Road 6	Goliad	Goliad	28°39′23″N 97°23′7″W	TPWD	
Goodnight Ranch State Historic Site†	Charles Goodnight Ranch House	4989 CR 25	Goodnight	Armstrong	35°1′50″N 101°10′59″W	THC	
Hueco Tanks State Park and Historic Site†	More images	6900 Hueco Tanks Road No. 1	El Paso	El Paso	31°55′2″N 106°2′38″W	TPWD	
Iwo Jima Museum and Monument State Historic Site		320 Iwo Jima Blvd.	Harlingen	Cameron	26°13′31″N 97°39′59″W	THC	
Landmark Inn State Historic Site†⁕⁑	More images	402 E. Florence St.	Castroville	Medina	29°21′18″N 98°52′29″W	THC	
Levi Jordan Plantation State Historic Site⁑	Levi Jordan Plantation State Historic Site	7234 FM 521	Brazoria	Brazoria	28°59′57″N 95°38′54″W	THC	
Lipantitlan State Historic Site	Upload image	Lipantitlan Park Rd.	Orange Grove	Nueces	27°57′53″N 97°49′4″W	THC	
Lyndon B. Johnson State Park and Historic Site‡	More images	Park Road 52	Stonewall	Gillespie	30°14′16″N 98°37′35″W	TPWD	
Magoffin Home State Historic Site†⁂⁕⁑	More images	1120 Magoffin Ave.	El Paso	El Paso	31°45′46″N 106°28′39″W	THC	Part of Magoffin Historic District
Mission Dolores State Historic Site†		701 S. Broadway St.	San Augustine	San Augustine	31°31′27″N 94°6′49″W	THC	
Monument Hill and Kreische Brewery State Historic Sites†⁕	More images	414 Loop 92	La Grange	Fayette	29°53′20″N 96°52′31″W	THC	
National Museum of the Pacific War⁕	More images	340 E. Main St.	Fredericksburg	Gillespie	30°16′19″N 98°52′2″W	THC	
Old Socorro Mission State Historic Site	More images	10551 Nicholas Rd.	Socorro	El Paso		THC	
Palmito Ranch Battlefield State Historic Site#†		43296 Palmito Hill Rd.	Brownsville	Cameron	25°56′48″N 97°17′7″W	THC	
Port Isabel Lighthouse State Historic Site†	More images	421 E. Queen Isabella Blvd.	Port Isabel	Cameron	26°4′41″N 97°12′26″W	THC	
Presidio La Bahía State Historic Site#†⁑		217 Loop 71	Goliad	Goliad	28°38′48″N 97°22′54″W	THC	
Sabine Pass Battleground State Historic Site		6100 Dowling Rd.	Port Arthur	Jefferson	29°43′43″N 93°52′30″W	THC	
Sam Bell Maxey House State Historic Site†⁕⁑	More images	812 S. Church St.	Paris	Lamar	33°39′14″N 95°33′17″W	THC	
Sam Rayburn House State Historic Site#†⁑		890 W. SH 56	Bonham	Fannin	33°34′10″N 96°12′27″W	THC	
San Felipe de Austin State Historic Site‡	More images	15945 FM 1458	San Felipe	Austin	29°48′25″N 96°5′51″W	THC	
San Jacinto Battleground State Historic Site#†⁕	More images	3523 Independence Pkwy S.	LaPorte	Harris	29°44′18″N 95°4′41″W	THC	
Seminole Canyon State Park and Historic Site‡	More images	US 90	Comstock	Val Verde	29°42′0″N 101°18′47″W	TPWD	
Slaton Harvey House State Historic Site		400 Railrad Ave.	Slaton	Lubbock	33°26′33″N 101°38′18″W	THC	
Starr Family Home State Historic Site†⁕	More images	407 W. Travis St.	Marshall	Harrison	32°32′30″N 94°22′15″W	THC	
Stephen F. Austin Memorial State Historic Site		900 Oil Field Rd.	West Columbia	Brazoria	29°9′21″N 95°39′13″W	THC	
Varner–Hogg Plantation State Historic Site†⁕⁑	More images	1702 N. 13th St.	West Columbia	Brazoria	29°9′45″N 95°38′28″W	THC	
Washington-on-the-Brazos State Historic Site	More images	23400 Park Road 12	Washington	Washington	30°19′25″N 96°9′17″W	THC	
Zaragoza Birthplace State Historic Site		217 Loop 71	Goliad	Goliad	28°38′53″N 97°22′55″W	THC	
