= National Register of Historic Places listings in the Gulf Coast region of Texas: Other =

This page is one of two listing the National Register of Historic Places listings in Texas' Gulf Coast.

The Gulf Coast region is an area of 13 counties defined by the Texas Comptroller for economic reporting, as mapped here. It includes the city of Houston and all of the Texas Panhandle by most definitions of that term. The region included 2020 population of about 7.3 million, or 25 percent of Texas' population, with Harris County having 65 percent of that, and Houston alone having about 32 percent of that.

This page includes all of the Gulf Coast region besides Harris County (Houston plus); for the latter please see that

This National Park Service list is complete through NPS recent listings posted March 21, 2025.

To see all locations together in a map, click on "Map all coordinates using OpenSourceMap" at right.

== Austin County ==
(not to be confused with the City of Austin, in Travis County)

	Name on the Register	Image	Date listed	Location	City or town	Description
1	Allens Creek Ossuary Site	Allens Creek Ossuary Site	March 21, 1975 (#75001946)	Address restricted	Wallis	41AU36, aka Earnest Witte Site
2	Austin County Courthouse	Austin County Courthouse	November 3, 2023 (#100009510)	1 East Main St. 29°57′01″N 96°15′27″W	Bellville	
3	Austin County Jail	Austin County Jail	November 12, 1980 (#80004074)	36 S. Bell St. 29°56′58″N 96°15′27″W	Bellville	Recorded Texas Historic Landmark
4	Bellville Turnverein	Bellville Turnverein	January 25, 2024 (#100009870)	966 East Main Street; 29°56′46″N 96°14′50″W	Bellville	
5	Church of the Guardian Angel	Church of the Guardian Angel	June 21, 1983 (#83003074)	5614 Demel St. 29°37′28″N 96°03′18″W	Wallis	Churches with Decorative Interior Painting TR
6	Old Masonic Hall	Old Masonic Hall	August 14, 1986 (#86001611)	15 N. Masonic St. 29°57′04″N 96°15′29″W	Bellville	
7	Roesler House		May 10, 1984 (#84001570)	W of Nelsonville on TX 159; 29°58′32″N 96°26′15″W	Nelsonville	Recorded Texas Historic Landmark
8	San Felipe de Austin Historic and Archeological District	San Felipe de Austin Historic and Archeological District	October 11, 2016 (#16000716)	15945 FM 1458; 29°48′25″N 96°05′52″W	San Felipe	State Historic Site
9	Wesley Brethren Church	Wesley Brethren Church	January 18, 1979 (#79002910)	S of Wesley; 30°03′55″N 96°29′53″W	Wesley	Recorded Texas Historic Landmark; Churches with Decorative Interior Painting TR
10	Witte-Schmid House	Witte-Schmid House	December 8, 1997 (#97001531)	Off Schoenau, near jct. with Eckermann; 30°00′07″N 96°33′38″W	Shelby	Recorded Texas Historic Landmark

== Brazoria County ==
	Name on the Register	Image	Date listed	Location	City or town	Description
1	Alvin Gulf, Colorado and Santa Fe Railway Passenger Depot	Alvin Gulf, Colorado and Santa Fe Railway Passenger Depot	March 6, 2019 (#100003467)	200 Depot Centre Blvd. 29°25′29″N 95°14′35″W	Alvin	
2	Brazoria Bridge	Brazoria Bridge	June 14, 1991 (#91000783)	0.9 mi. E of TX 36 on TX 332; 29°03′15″N 95°33′25″W	Brazoria	Recorded Texas Historic Landmark
3	Alden B. Dow Office and Lake Jackson City Hall	Alden B. Dow Office and Lake Jackson City Hall	March 1, 2010 (#10000050)	101 S. Parking Place; 29°02′26″N 95°26′55″W	Lake Jackson	
4	Durazno Plantation	Durazno Plantation	September 2, 1980 (#80004081)	S of Jones Creek off TX 36; 28°57′22″N 95°26′57″W	Jones Creek	
5	East Columbia Historic District	East Columbia Historic District	October 28, 1991 (#91001602)	S. Main St. 29°08′31″N 95°36′54″W	East Columbia	Includes Recorded Texas Historic Landmarks
6	Gazebo for James Richard Marmion	Gazebo for James Richard Marmion	October 22, 2004 (#04001173)	1214 County Rd. 29°02′34″N 95°38′40″W	Sweeny	Sculpture by Dionicio Rodriguez
7	GEN. C. B. COMSTOCK (dredge) Shipwreck Site	GEN. C. B. COMSTOCK (dredge) Shipwreck Site	July 6, 1995 (#94001119)	Address restricted	Surfside Beach	
8	John McCroskey Log House	John McCroskey Log House	August 28, 1975 (#75001958)	2 mi. NE of Cedar Lake on Stringfellow Ranch; 28°56′22″N 95°36′54″W	Cedar Lake	
9	Old Brazoria County Courthouse	Old Brazoria County Courthouse	March 12, 1979 (#79002922)	Public Sq. 29°10′08″N 95°25′52″W	Angleton	State Antiquities Landmark, Recorded Texas Historic Landmark
10	Palapa Table for James Richard Marmion	Palapa Table for James Richard Marmion	October 22, 2004 (#04001172)	1214 County Rd. 29°02′38″N 95°38′51″W	Sweeny	Sculpture by Dionicio Rodriguez
11	Henry Smith Statue	Henry Smith Statue	October 19, 2018 (#100003040)	Intersection of N Brooks & W Smith Sts. 29°02′49″N 95°34′14″W	Brazoria	In honor of Henry Smith (Texas governor) who lived in Brazoria for a while. Recorded Texas Historic Landmark
12	Ammon Underwood House	Ammon Underwood House	June 24, 1976 (#76002011)	505 Main St. 29°08′25″N 95°37′02″W	East Columbia	Recorded Texas Historic Landmark; relocated in 2005 due to river encroachment
13	Varner-Hogg Plantation	Varner-Hogg Plantation	April 9, 1980 (#80004082)	2 mi. NE of West Columbia off FM 2852; 29°09′47″N 95°38′25″W	West Columbia	State Historic Site, State Antiquities Landmark, Recorded Texas Historic Landmark

== Chambers County ==
	Name on the Register	Image	Date listed	Location	City or town	Description
1	Archeological Site 41 CH 110	Archeological Site 41 CH 110	July 14, 1971 (#71000924)	Address restricted	Cove	
2	Chambers County Courthouse	Chambers County Courthouse	April 25, 2008 (#08000339)	404 Washington St., 29°46′09″N 94°41′05″W	Anahuac	
3	Chambersea	Chambersea	November 19, 1979 (#79002925)	Washington and Cummings Sts; 29°46′15″N 94°41′05″W	Anahuac	State Antiquities Landmark, Recorded Texas Historic Landmark; General Thomas Jefferson Chambers House
4	Fort Anahuac	Fort Anahuac	July 1, 1981 (#81000626)	Corner of Main St. and Chambers; 29°45′24″N 94°41′17″W	Anahuac	State Antiquities Landmark
5	Old Wallisville Town Site	Old Wallisville Town Site	March 30, 1982 (#82004495)	Address restricted	Wallisville	
6	Orcoquisac Archeological District	Orcoquisac Archeological District	July 14, 1971 (#71000925)	Address restricted	Wallisville	

== Colorado County ==
	Name on the Register	Image	Date listed	Location	City or town	Description
1	Colorado County Courthouse	Colorado County Courthouse	July 12, 1976 (#76002015)	Bounded by Milam, Spring, Travis and Walnut Sts. 29°42′21″N 96°32′23″W	Columbus	State Antiquities Landmark, Recorded Texas Historic Landmark; part of Colorado County Courthouse Historic District; Neoclassical building erected in 1890-1891 in the form of a Greek cross
2	Colorado County Courthouse Historic District	Colorado County Courthouse Historic District	June 23, 1978 (#78002907)	Roughly bounded by Preston, Walnut, Milam, Front, Washington, and Live Oak Sts. 29°42′22″N 96°32′26″W	Columbus	Includes State Antiquities Landmark, several Recorded Texas Historic Landmarks
3	Eagle Lake Commercial Historic District	Eagle Lake Commercial Historic District	June 5, 2007 (#07000494)	100-416 E. Main St., 101-108 W. Main St., 101-124 Commerce St., 101-201 N. McCarty Ave., and 100-203 E. Post Office St. 29°35′21″N 96°20′02″W	Eagle Lake	
4	Harrison-Hastedt House	Harrison-Hastedt House	March 22, 2004 (#04000231)	236 Preston St. 29°42′32″N 96°32′16″W	Columbus	Recorded Texas Historic Landmark
5	Old Spanish Trail from US 90 to I-10	Old Spanish Trail from US 90 to I-10	April 16, 2013 (#13000176)	County Road 268 between U.S. Route 90 and a northern access road for I-10; 29°42′23″N 96°31′27″W	Columbus	
6	Stafford Bank and Opera House	Stafford Bank and Opera House	May 8, 1973 (#73002276)	Milan and Spring Sts. 29°42′19″N 96°32′25″W	Columbus	Recorded Texas Historic Landmark; part of Colorado County Courthouse Historic District; Second Empire style building completed in 1886.
7	State Highway 3 Bridge at the Colorado River	State Highway 3 Bridge at the Colorado River	October 10, 1996 (#96001111)	U.S. Route 90, 0.6 miles east of its junction with Loop 329; 29°42′23″N 96°32′11″W	Columbus	Three-span Parker through truss bridge built in 1932.

== Fort Bend County ==
	Name on the Register	Image	Date listed	Location	City or town	Description
1	Fort Bend County Courthouse	Fort Bend County Courthouse	March 13, 1980 (#80004119)	400 Jackson St. 29°34′54″N 95°45′42″W	Richmond	State Antiquities Landmark, Recorded Texas Historic Landmark
2	Henry G. and Annie B. Green House	Henry G. and Annie B. Green House	September 18, 1996 (#96001016)	.5 mi SE of old US 59 and TX 118; 29°26′59″N 95°59′38″W	Kendleton	Demolished in 2018.
3	Holy Rosary Catholic Church		July 8, 2022 (#100007913)	1416 George St. 29°33′12″N 95°48′59″W	Rosenberg	
4	Imperial Sugar Company Refinery Historic District	Imperial Sugar Company Refinery Historic District	June 26, 2017 (#100001253)	198 Kempner St. 29°37′15″N 95°38′11″W	Sugar Land	
5	Lamar-Calder House	Lamar-Calder House	March 30, 2005 (#05000244)	915 Front St. 29°34′40″N 95°45′23″W	Richmond	
6	Methodist Church of Richmond	Methodist Church of Richmond	June 13, 2014 (#14000339)	400 Jackson Street; 29°34′56″N 95°45′42″W	Richmond	Recorded Texas Historic Landmark
7	John M. and Lottie D. Moore House	John M. and Lottie D. Moore House	December 9, 2001 (#01000104)	406 S. Fifth St. 29°34′51″N 95°45′44″W	Richmond	Recorded Texas Historic Landmark
8	B. Ray and Charlotte Woods House	B. Ray and Charlotte Woods House	January 6, 2004 (#03001377)	610 Woods Ln. 29°47′00″N 95°49′39″W	Katy	

== Galveston County ==
	Name on the Register	Image	Date listed	Location	City or town	Description
1	American National Insurance Company (ANICO)	American National Insurance Company (ANICO)	May 20, 2021 (#100006539)	1 Moody Ave. (1902 Market St.); 29°18′24″N 94°47′24″W	Galveston	AKA One Moody Plaza.
2	Ashton Villa	Ashton Villa	October 28, 1969 (#69000204)	2328 Broadway; 29°17′59″N 94°47′33″W	Galveston	Recorded Texas Historic Landmark
3	Bayou Brae Historic District		May 24, 2021 (#100006547)	All properties on Bayou Dr., Brae Ln., Coryell St., Oboe Trail, Woodwind Way, and Viola Dr. 29°31′36″N 95°04′35″W	League City	
4	Henry Beissner House	Henry Beissner House	April 3, 1978 (#78002929)	2818 Ball Ave. 29°18′01″N 94°47′56″W	Galveston	
5	Bishop's Palace	Bishop's Palace	August 25, 1970 (#70000746)	1402 Ave. J (Broadway); 29°18′17″N 94°46′55″W	Galveston	Recorded Texas Historic Landmark, part of East End Historic District
6	Broadway Cemetery Historic District	Broadway Cemetery Historic District	June 13, 2014 (#14000340)	6 blocks between Broadway Ave., Ave. L, 43rd & 40th Sts. 29°17′37″N 94°48′46″W	Galveston	
7	Wegner Brothers Building	Wegner Brothers Building	August 14, 1984 (#84001671)	1921–1921 1/2 Ave. D 29°18′21″N 94°47′23″W	Galveston	Historic Resources of the Galveston Central Business District MRA
8	Building at 1925–1927 Market Street	Building at 1925–1927 Market Street	August 14, 1984 (#84001668)	1925–1927 Market St. 29°18′25″N 94°47′29″W	Galveston	Historic Resources of the Galveston Central Business District MRA
9	Cedar Lawn Historic District	Cedar Lawn Historic District	December 20, 2002 (#02001570)	Bounded by 45th. St., 48th St., Ave. L, and Ave. N, 29°17′23″N 94°49′04″W	Galveston	
10	City Hall	City Hall	August 14, 1984 (#84001676)	823 25th St. 29°18′01″N 94°47′43″W	Galveston	Historic Resources of the Galveston Central Business District MRA
11	City National Bank	City National Bank	August 14, 1984 (#84001680)	2219 Market St; 29°18′20″N 94°47′36″W	Galveston	Historic Resources of the Galveston Central Business District MRA
12	Congregation Beth Jacob	Congregation Beth Jacob	January 4, 2024 (#100009737)	2401 Avenue K 29°17′55″N 94°47′34″W	Galveston	
13	Frank B. Davison House	Frank B. Davison House	June 29, 1976 (#76002033)	109 3rd Ave. 29°23′13″N 94°53′42″W	Texas City	State Antiquities Landmark, Recorded Texas Historic Landmark
14	Denver Court Historic District	Denver Court Historic District	January 14, 2002 (#01001471)	Roughly bounded by Aves. S1/2 and U1/2, 43rd and 52nd Sts. 29°16′39″N 94°48′54″W	Galveston	
15	East End Historic District	East End Historic District	May 30, 1975 (#75001979)	Irregular pattern including both sides of Broadway and Market Sts. 29°18′16″N 94°46′58″W	Galveston	Includes Recorded Texas Historic Landmarks
16	Eiband's	Eiband's	August 14, 1984 (#84001683)	2001 Central Plaza; 29°18′16″N 94°47′32″W	Galveston	Historic Resources of the Galveston Central Business District MRA
17	ELISSA	ELISSA	March 21, 1978 (#78002930)	Pier 21, 21st Street and Harborside Drive; 29°18′34″N 94°47′37″W	Galveston	
18	Falstaff Brewery	Falstaff Brewery	August 29, 2018 (#100002841)	3302 Church St. (Ave. F); 29°18′03″N 94°48′22″W	Galveston	This structure is currently abandoned
19	First Evangelical Lutheran Church	First Evangelical Lutheran Church	August 14, 1984 (#84001688)	2401 Ave. G 29°18′09″N 94°47′39″W	Galveston	Recorded Texas Historic Landmark; Historic Resources of the Galveston Central Business District MRA
20	First Presbyterian Church	First Presbyterian Church	January 29, 1979 (#79002942)	1903 Church St. 29°18′15″N 94°47′19″W	Galveston	Recorded Texas Historic Landmark
21	Fort Travis	Fort Travis	March 30, 2005 (#05000247)	TX 87 at Loop 108; 29°21′53″N 94°45′29″W	Port Bolivar	State Antiquities Landmark
22	Galveston Causeway	Galveston Causeway	December 12, 1976 (#76002028)	Spans Galveston Bay from Virginia Point to Galveston Island; 29°17′51″N 94°53′12″W	Galveston	State Antiquities Landmark
23	Galveston, Houston & Henderson (GH&H) Freight Depot	Galveston, Houston & Henderson (GH&H) Freight Depot	January 10, 2020 (#100004866)	325 33rd St. 29°18′09″N 94°48′20″W	Galveston	
24	Galveston Orphans Home	Galveston Orphans Home	March 21, 1979 (#79002943)	1315 21st St. 29°17′50″N 94°47′19″W	Galveston	Recorded Texas Historic Landmark
25	Galveston Seawall	Galveston Seawall	August 18, 1977 (#77001443)	Seawall Blvd. 29°18′09″N 94°46′27″W	Galveston	State Antiquities Landmark
26	Galveston US Post Office, Custom House and Courthouse	Galveston US Post Office, Custom House and Courthouse	April 25, 2001 (#01000438)	601 25th St. (Rosenberg St.); 29°18′08″N 94°47′45″W	Galveston	
27	Galvez Hotel	Galvez Hotel	April 4, 1979 (#79002944)	2024 Seawall Blvd. 29°17′32″N 94°47′08″W	Galveston	Recorded Texas Historic Landmark
28	Garten Verein Pavilion	Garten Verein Pavilion	July 20, 1977 (#77001444)	27th St. and Avenue O (Kempner Park); 29°17′34″N 94°47′41″W	Galveston	State Antiquities Landmark, Recorded Texas Historic Landmark
29	Grace Episcopal Church	Grace Episcopal Church	April 3, 1975 (#75001980)	1115 36th St. 29°17′39″N 94°48′23″W	Galveston	Recorded Texas Historic Landmark
30	Grand Opera House	Grand Opera House	January 2, 1974 (#74002071)	2012–2020 Ave. E 29°17′47″N 94°47′26″W	Galveston	Recorded Texas Historic Landmark
31	John Hagemann House	John Hagemann House	June 1, 1982 (#82004505)	3301 Ave. L 29°17′40″N 94°48′47″W	Galveston	Recorded Texas Historic Landmark
32	House at 2017–2023 Avenue I	House at 2017–2023 Avenue I	August 14, 1984 (#84001698)	2017–2023 Ave. I 29°18′05″N 94°47′07″W	Galveston	Historic Resources of the Galveston Central Business District MRA
33	House at 2528 Postoffice St.	House at 2528 Postoffice St.	August 14, 1984 (#84001700)	2528 Postoffice St. 29°18′13″N 94°47′49″W	Galveston	Historic Resources of the Galveston Central Business District MRA
34	Sealy Hutchings House	Sealy Hutchings House	July 29, 1994 (#94000796)	2805 Ave. O 29°17′31″N 94°47′44″W	Galveston	
35	I.O.O.F. Lodge	I.O.O.F. Lodge	August 14, 1984 (#84001703)	505 20th St. 29°18′18″N 94°47′24″W	Galveston	Historic Resources of the Galveston Central Business District MRA
36	Illies Building-Justine Apartments	Illies Building-Justine Apartments	August 22, 1995 (#95001028)	503 21st St. 29°17′49″N 94°46′56″W	Galveston	Historic Resources of the Galveston Central Business District MRA
37	Daniel Webster Kempner House	Daniel Webster Kempner House	March 30, 1979 (#79002945)	2504 Ave. O 29°17′35″N 94°47′34″W	Galveston	Part of Silk Stocking Residential Historic District
38	Jean Lafitte Hotel	Jean Lafitte Hotel	August 14, 1984 (#84001705)	2105 Ave. F 29°18′14″N 94°47′27″W	Galveston	Historic Resources of the Galveston Central Business District MRA
39	Lasker Home for Homeless Children	Lasker Home for Homeless Children	April 14, 1983 (#83003140)	1019 16th St. 29°18′02″N 94°47′01″W	Galveston	Recorded Texas Historic Landmark; part of Lost Bayou Historic District
40	E.S. Levy Building	E.S. Levy Building	November 13, 2003 (#03001163)	2221–2225 Market St. 29°18′17″N 94°47′36″W	Galveston	Historic Resources of the Galveston Central Business District MRA
41	Lost Bayou Historic District	Lost Bayou Historic District	June 19, 2017 (#100001224)	Roughly bounded by Broadway, Ave. N, 14th & 21st Sts. 29°17′58″N 94°47′06″W	Galveston	Includes Recorded Texas Historic Landmarks
42	Marschner Building	Marschner Building	August 14, 1984 (#84001706)	1914–1916 Mechanic St. 29°18′26″N 94°47′23″W	Galveston	Recorded Texas Historic Landmark; Historic Resources of the Galveston Central Business District MRA
43	McKinney-McDonald House	McKinney-McDonald House	May 4, 1976 (#76002030)	926 Winnie St. 29°18′24″N 94°46′39″W	Galveston	
44	Melrose Apartment Building	Melrose Apartment Building	October 14, 1998 (#98001246)	2002 Post Office St. 29°18′19″N 94°47′26″W	Galveston	Historic Resources of the Galveston Central Business District MRA
45	Michel B. Menard House	Michel B. Menard House	December 12, 1976 (#76002031)	1605 33rd St. 29°17′27″N 94°48′06″W	Galveston	
46	Merimax Building	Merimax Building	January 24, 1985 (#85000121)	521 22nd St. 29°18′15″N 94°47′32″W	Galveston	Historic Resources of the Galveston Central Business District MRA
47	Model Laundry	Model Laundry	August 14, 1984 (#84001707)	513–523 25th St. 29°18′10″N 94°47′45″W	Galveston	Historic Resources of the Galveston Central Business District MRA
48	Col. Hugh B. and Helen Moore House	Col. Hugh B. and Helen Moore House	October 28, 1994 (#94001241)	8 Ninth Ave., N. 29°23′38″N 94°54′10″W	Texas City	Recorded Texas Historic Landmark
49	Mosquito Fleet Berth, Pier 19	Mosquito Fleet Berth, Pier 19	April 21, 1975 (#75001981)	N end of 20th St., Pier 19; 29°18′39″N 94°47′25″W	Galveston	State Antiquities Landmark
50	Old Galveston Customhouse	Old Galveston Customhouse	August 25, 1970 (#70000747)	Southeast corner 20th and Post Office (Ave. E) Sts. 29°18′18″N 94°47′23″W	Galveston	
51	Parkland Apartments		January 7, 2022 (#100007354)	3916 Winnie St. (Ave. G); 29°17′52″N 94°48′43″W	Galveston	
52	Pix Building	Pix Building	August 14, 1984 (#84001713)	2128 Postoffice St. 29°18′18″N 94°47′32″W	Galveston	Historic Resources of the Galveston Central Business District MRA
53	Point Bolivar Lighthouse	Point Bolivar Lighthouse	August 18, 1977 (#77001445)	TX 87; 29°22′00″N 94°46′00″W	Port Bolivar	
54	Powhatan House	Powhatan House	October 6, 1975 (#75001982)	3427 Ave. O 29°17′24″N 94°48′11″W	Galveston	Recorded Texas Historic Landmark
55	Quigg-Baulard House	Quigg-Baulard House	September 17, 2015 (#15000618)	2628 Broadway; 29°17′57″N 94°47′48″W	Galveston	Recorded Texas Historic Landmark
56	Reedy Chapel-AME Church	Reedy Chapel-AME Church	September 14, 1984 (#84001717)	2013 Broadway; 29°18′00″N 94°47′19″W	Galveston	Recorded Texas Historic Landmark
57	Robinson Building	Robinson Building	August 14, 1984 (#84001720)	2009–2011 Postoffice St. 29°18′17″N 94°47′26″W	Galveston	Historic Resources of the Galveston Central Business District MRA
58	Rosenberg Library	Rosenberg Library	August 14, 1984 (#84001722)	2310 Sealy St. 29°18′03″N 94°47′34″W	Galveston	Historic Resources of the Galveston Central Business District MRA
59	Rosewood Cemetery		February 9, 2024 (#100009946)	2825 63rd Street; 29°16′24″N 94°49′56″W	Galveston	
60	Scottish Rite Cathedral	Scottish Rite Cathedral	August 14, 1984 (#84001724)	2128 Church St. 29°18′14″N 94°47′30″W	Galveston	Historic Resources of the Galveston Central Business District MRA
61	George Sealy House	George Sealy House	October 28, 1969 (#69000205)	2424 Broadway; 29°17′59″N 94°47′37″W	Galveston	Recorded Texas Historic Landmark
62	The Settlement Historic District	The Settlement Historic District	May 17, 2010 (#10000268)	Centered on the intersection of N Bell Dr and the 100 block of S Bell Dr with cross-streets Carver Ave and Eunice St; 29°22′58″N 94°58′38″W	Texas City	
63	M. W. Shaw Building	M. W. Shaw Building	August 14, 1984 (#84001728)	2427 Ave. D 29°18′16″N 94°47′45″W	Galveston	Historic Resources of the Galveston Central Business District MRA
64	Silk Stocking Residential Historic District	Silk Stocking Residential Historic District	May 10, 1996 (#96000539)	Roughly bounded by Ave. K, 23rd St., Ave. P, and 26th St. 29°17′42″N 94°47′30″W	Galveston	Includes Recorded Texas Historic Landmarks
65	Ashbel Smith Building	Ashbel Smith Building	October 28, 1969 (#69000203)	914–916 Ave. B 29°18′48″N 94°46′44″W	Galveston	State Antiquities Landmark, Recorded Texas Historic Landmark
66	SS SELMA (steamship)	SS SELMA (steamship)	January 5, 1994 (#93001449)	Within the channel between Galveston and Port Bolivar; 29°20′39″N 94°47′11″W	Galveston	
67	St. Joseph's Church	St. Joseph's Church	December 12, 1976 (#76002032)	2202 Ave. K 29°17′57″N 94°47′26″W	Galveston	Recorded Texas Historic Landmark
68	St. Mary's Cathedral	St. Mary's Cathedral	June 4, 1973 (#73001964)	2011 Church Ave. 29°18′14″N 94°47′24″W	Galveston	Recorded Texas Historic Landmark
69	Star Drug Store	Star Drug Store	August 14, 1984 (#84001731)	510 23rd St. 29°18′14″N 94°47′35″W	Galveston	Historic Resources of the Galveston Central Business District MRA
70	Steffens-Drewa House Complex	Steffens-Drewa House Complex	December 1, 1988 (#88002671)	2701, 2705, and 2709 Ave. O 29°17′32″N 94°47′40″W	Galveston	
71	The Strand Historic District	The Strand Historic District	January 26, 1970 (#70000748)	Roughly bounded by Ave. A, 20th St., alley between Aves. C and D, and railroad depot 29°18′23″N 94°47′37″W	Galveston	Includes Recorded Texas Historic Landmarks
72	Stringfellow Orchards	Stringfellow Orchards	February 27, 2013 (#13000043)	7902 TX 6; 29°21′00″N 95°01′01″W	Hitchcock	
73	Sweeney-Royston House	Sweeney-Royston House	September 1, 1978 (#78002931)	2402 Ave. L 29°17′52″N 94°47′32″W	Galveston	Recorded Texas Historic Landmark; part of Silk Stocking Residential Historic District
74	Texas Building	Texas Building	August 14, 1984 (#84001734)	2200 Central Plaza; 29°18′18″N 94°47′33″W	Galveston	Historic Resources of the Galveston Central Business District MRA
75	Texas Heroes Monument	Texas Heroes Monument	August 14, 1984 (#84001737)	25th and Broadway; 29°17′57″N 94°47′39″W	Galveston	Historic Resources of the Galveston Central Business District MRA
76	Trinity Protestant Episcopal Church	Trinity Protestant Episcopal Church	September 4, 1979 (#79002946)	22nd St. and Ave. G 29°18′08″N 94°47′31″W	Galveston	Includes Recorded Texas Historic Landmarks
77	Trueheart-Adriance Building	Trueheart-Adriance Building	July 14, 1971 (#71000933)	212 22nd St. 29°18′24″N 94°47′33″W	Galveston	Recorded Texas Historic Landmark; part of The Strand Historic District
78	U.S. National Bank	U.S. National Bank	August 14, 1984 (#84001739)	2201 Ave. D 29°18′19″N 94°47′34″W	Galveston	Historic Resources of the Galveston Central Business District MRA
79	USS CAVALLA (submarine)	USS CAVALLA (submarine)	May 27, 2008 (#08000477)	East End of Seawolf Park; 29°20′09″N 94°46′46″W	Galveston	
80	USS HATTERAS (41GV68)	USS HATTERAS (41GV68)	January 28, 1977 (#77001567)	Address restricted	Galveston	Sunk 20 miles (32 km) off the Galveston coast during the Civil War.
81	USS STEWART	USS STEWART	July 12, 2007 (#07000689)	East End of Seawolf Park; 29°20′09″N 94°46′46″W	Galveston	
82	Samuel May Williams House	Samuel May Williams House	July 14, 1971 (#71000934)	3601 Ave. P 29°17′16″N 94°48′15″W	Galveston	Recorded Texas Historic Landmark
83	Willis-Moody Mansion	Willis-Moody Mansion	May 13, 1994 (#94000410)	2618 Broadway; 29°17′57″N 94°47′46″W	Galveston	Recorded Texas Historic Landmark

== Liberty County ==
	Name on the Register	Image	Date listed	Location	City or town	Description
1	Black Cloud	Black Cloud	October 22, 1992 (#92001401)	Address restricted	Liberty	
2	Thomas Jefferson Chambers House		April 8, 2011 (#11000156)	624 Milam St; 30°03′42″N 94°47′53″W	Liberty	Recorded Texas Historic Landmark
3	Cleveland-Partlow House	Cleveland-Partlow House	February 16, 1984 (#84001907)	2131 Grand Ave. 30°03′49″N 94°47′06″W	Liberty	Recorded Texas Historic Landmark
4	Liberty County Courthouse	Liberty County Courthouse	December 12, 2002 (#02001514)	1923 Sam Houston Blvd. 30°03′32″N 94°47′47″W	Liberty	
5	Site 41 Lb 4	Site 41 Lb 4	July 14, 1971 (#71000947)	Address restricted	Dayton	
6	State Highway 3 Bridge at the Trinity River	State Highway 3 Bridge at the Trinity River	October 10, 1996 (#96001114)	US 90, 1.3 mi (2.1 km). W of jct. with FM 2684; 30°03′27″N 94°49′09″W	Liberty	Historic Bridges of Texas, 1866-1945 MPS

== Matagorda County ==
	Name on the Register	Image	Date listed	Location	City or town	Description
1	Bay City Post Office	Bay City Post Office	May 12, 2009 (#09000307)	2100 Ave. F 28°58′59″N 95°58′12″W	Bay City	
2	Bay City USO Building	Bay City USO Building	June 14, 2006 (#06000512)	2105 Ave. M 28°58′58″N 95°57′41″W	Bay City	Recorded Texas Historic Landmark
3	Blessing Masonic Lodge No. 411	Blessing Masonic Lodge No. 411	February 4, 2011 (#10001222)	619 Ave B, FM 616; 28°52′34″N 96°13′08″W	Blessing	Recorded Texas Historic Landmark
4	Christ Episcopal Church	Christ Episcopal Church	April 10, 2012 (#12000196)	206 Cypress Street; 28°41′33″N 95°58′03″W	Matagorda	Recorded Texas Historic Landmark
5	Hensley-Gusman House	Hensley-Gusman House	October 4, 2006 (#06000927)	2120 Sixth St. 28°58′56″N 95°57′52″W	Bay City	Recorded Texas Historic Landmark
6	R. J. Hill Building	R. J. Hill Building	October 14, 2009 (#09000840)	401 Commerce St. 28°42′01″N 96°12′54″W	Palacios	Recorded Texas Historic Landmark
7	Judge William Shields Holman House	Judge William Shields Holman House	February 4, 2011 (#10001223)	2504 Avenue K 28°58′43″N 95°57′51″W	Bay City	Recorded Texas Historic Landmark; part of South Side Residential Historic District
8	Hotel Blessing	Hotel Blessing	February 1, 1979 (#79002993)	Ave. B 28°52′17″N 96°13′19″W	Blessing	Recorded Texas Historic Landmark
9	Luther Hotel	Luther Hotel	May 10, 2010 (#10000251)	408 S Bay Blvd. 28°41′58″N 96°12′57″W	Palacios	Recorded Texas Historic Landmark
10	Matagorda Cemetery	Matagorda Cemetery	June 15, 2006 (#06000511)	Jct. of TX 60 at Matagorda Cty Rds 259 and 260; 28°42′10″N 95°57′20″W	Matagorda	
11	Matagorda County Monument	Matagorda County Monument	April 19, 2018 (#100002351)	1700 7th St. 28°58′58″N 95°58′11″W	Bay City	
12	Price-Farwell House	Price-Farwell House	October 14, 2009 (#09000841)	308 S. Bay Blvd. 28°41′55″N 96°12′50″W	Palacios	Recorded Texas Historic Landmark
13	South Side Residential Historic District	South Side Residential Historic District	May 30, 2007 (#07000496)	Roughly bounded by Ave. F, 2nd St., Ave. G, Ave. K, 4th St., Ave J, 5th St., 4th St. 28°48′57″N 95°57′59″W	Bay City	Includes Recorded Texas Historic Landmark

== Montgomery County ==
	Name on the Register	Image	Date listed	Location	City or town	Description
1	Kirbee Kiln Site		August 28, 1973 (#73001970)	Address Restricted	Montgomery	Manufacturing Site of mid-19th-century Texas stoneware pottery. 41MQ38
2	Montgomery County Hospital		April 12, 2024 (#100010230)	301 S. 1st Street; 30°18′29″N 95°27′10″W	Montgomery	

== Walker County ==
	Name on the Register	Image	Date listed	Location	City or town	Description
1	Austin Hall	Austin Hall	January 2, 2013 (#12001134)	1741 University Ave. 30°42′56″N 95°33′00″W	Huntsville	State Antiquities Landmark, Recorded Texas Historic Landmark; on the campus of Sam Houston State University
2	Josey Boy Scout Lodge and Keeper's Cabin	Josey Boy Scout Lodge and Keeper's Cabin	July 23, 2018 (#100002700)	2201 Ave. M 30°42′33″N 95°33′07″W	Huntsville	
3	Sam Houston House	Sam Houston House	May 30, 1974 (#74002097)	Ave. L, Sam Houston State University; 30°42′53″N 95°33′10″W	Huntsville	State Antiquities Landmark, includes additional State Antiquities Landmark and Recorded Texas Historic Landmarks; also known as Woodland
4	Riverside Swinging Bridge	Riverside Swinging Bridge	September 12, 1979 (#79003020)	NE of Riverside; 30°51′26″N 95°23′46″W	Riverside	Extends into Trinity County
5	State Highway 19 Bridge at Trinity River	State Highway 19 Bridge at Trinity River	December 1, 2004 (#04001290)	TX 19, on the Trinity/Walker county line 30°51′35″N 95°23′55″W	Riverside	Historic Bridges of Texas, 1866-1945 MPS, extends into Trinity County
6	John W. Thomason House	John W. Thomason House	August 11, 1982 (#82004528)	1207 Ave. J 30°43′21″N 95°32′54″W	Huntsville	The Thomason House is the birthplace and home of noted Texas author and illustrator John William Thomason, Jr. He was commissioned a second lieutenant i n the Marine Corps and was assigned to the Pacific Fleet during World War II . All of the books and short stories Thomason wrote were illustrated with pen and ink sketches and dealt with Texas, theMarines, and his experiences i n the service. Several of his short stories frequently appeared in the Saturday Evening Post. Thomason wrote and illustrate d for Charles Scribner and Sons Publishers, producing such masterpieces as J. E. B. Stuart (1933) and Fix Bayonets (1926). Some of his other noted works include Marines and Others (1929) Salt Winds and Gold Dust (1934) and Lone Star Preacher (1941). California on March 12, 1944.

== Waller County ==
	Name on the Register	Image	Date listed	Location	City or town	Description
1	L.C. Anderson Hall	L.C. Anderson Hall	June 3, 1999 (#99000611)	L.W. Minor St., building #0541; 30°05′38″N 95°59′26″W	Prairie View	Prairie View A&M University MPS
2	W.R. Banks Library	W.R. Banks Library	June 3, 1999 (#99000612)	L.W. Minor St., building #0508; 30°05′36″N 95°59′21″W	Prairie View	Prairie View A&M University MPS
3	Annie Laurie Evans Hall	Annie Laurie Evans Hall	June 3, 1999 (#99000613)	L.W. Minor St., building #0544; 30°05′37″N 95°59′25″W	Prairie View	Prairie View A&M University MPS
4	Hilliard Hall		June 3, 1999 (#99000614)	A.G. Cleaver St., building #0537; 30°05′42″N 95°58′48″W	Prairie View	Prairie View A&M University MPS
5	Liendo Plantation	Liendo Plantation	June 21, 1971 (#71000970)	2 mi (3.2 km). NE of Hempstead off FM 1488; 30°05′47″N 96°01′47″W	Hempstead	Recorded Texas Historic Landmark
6	Veterinary Hospital	Veterinary Hospital	June 3, 1999 (#99000617)	E.M. Norris St., building #0517; 30°05′37″N 95°59′03″W	Prairie View	Prairie View A&M University MPS
7	G.R. Woolfolk Social and Political Science Building	G.R. Woolfolk Social and Political Science Building	June 3, 1999 (#99000616)	A.G. Cleaver St., building #0503; 30°05′41″N 95°59′20″W	Prairie View	Prairie View A&M University MPS

== Wharton County ==
	Name on the Register	Image	Date listed	Location	City or town	Description
1	Stephen F. Austin Elementary School		February 1, 2022 (#100007404)	500 Abell St. 29°18′46″N 96°05′32″W	Wharton	
2	Willie Banker Jr. House	Willie Banker Jr. House	March 18, 1993 (#93000118)	401 N. Rusk; 29°18′49″N 96°05′52″W	Wharton	
3	Moses Bernstein House		March 18, 1993 (#93000116)	1705 N. Richmond; 29°19′35″N 96°05′51″W	Wharton	Historic and Architectural Resources of Wharton MPS
4	Bolton-Outlar House	Bolton-Outlar House	March 18, 1993 (#93000108)	517 N. Richmond; 29°18′57″N 96°06′05″W	Wharton	Historic and Architectural Resources of Wharton MPS
5	Colorado River Bridge	Colorado River Bridge	March 18, 1993 (#93000117)	S. Richmond Rd. (Old US 59) across the Colorado R. 29°18′30″N 96°06′13″W	Wharton	Historic and Architectural Resources of Wharton MPS
6	Wiley J. Croom House	Wiley J. Croom House	March 18, 1993 (#93000099)	205 E. Milam; 29°18′38″N 96°05′55″W	Wharton	Historic and Architectural Resources of Wharton MPS
7	F. F. Dannon House		March 18, 1993 (#93000095)	612 W. Caney; 29°18′49″N 96°06′19″W	Wharton	Historic and Architectural Resources of Wharton MPS
8	Dr. Green Davidson House	Dr. Green Davidson House	March 18, 1993 (#93000111)	404 Bolton; 29°18′56″N 96°06′07″W	Wharton	Historic and Architectural Resources of Wharton MPS
9	Ben and Mary Davis House	Ben and Mary Davis House	March 18, 1993 (#93000104)	100 S. Resident; 29°18′37″N 96°05′54″W	Wharton	Historic and Architectural Resources of Wharton MPS
10	Nettie Elkins House	Nettie Elkins House	March 18, 1993 (#93000114)	109 E. Alabama; 29°18′50″N 96°05′54″W	Wharton	Historic and Architectural Resources of Wharton MPS
11	E. Clyde and Mary Elliott House	E. Clyde and Mary Elliott House	March 18, 1993 (#93000122)	707 N. Walnut; 29°18′57″N 96°05′37″W	Wharton	Historic and Architectural Resources of Wharton MPS
12	Old First Methodist Episcopal Church South	Old First Methodist Episcopal Church South	March 18, 1993 (#93000097)	200 N. Fulton; 29°18′46″N 96°05′56″W	Wharton	Historic and Architectural Resources of Wharton MPS
13	Henry B. Garrett House	Henry B. Garrett House	March 18, 1993 (#93000098)	504 N. Fulton; 29°18′56″N 96°05′46″W	Wharton	Historic and Architectural Resources of Wharton MPS
14	John A. and Sophie Garrett House	John A. and Sophie Garrett House	March 18, 1993 (#93000115)	401 E. Alabama; 29°18′47″N 96°05′44″W	Wharton	Historic and Architectural Resources of Wharton MPS
15	George C. and Annie Gifford House	George C. and Annie Gifford House	March 18, 1993 (#93000096)	615 W. Caney; 29°18′47″N 96°06′20″W	Wharton	Historic and Architectural Resources of Wharton MPS
16	Joseph Andrew Hamilton House	Joseph Andrew Hamilton House	March 18, 1993 (#93000106)	325 N. Richmond; 29°18′53″N 96°06′09″W	Wharton	Recorded Texas Historic Landmark; Historic and Architectural Resources of Wharton MPS
17	Gerard A. Harrison House	Gerard A. Harrison House	March 18, 1993 (#93000112)	209 E. Caney; 29°18′42″N 96°05′53″W	Wharton	Historic and Architectural Resources of Wharton MPS
18	Harrison-Dennis House	Harrison-Dennis House	March 18, 1993 (#93000110)	409 W. Burleson; 29°18′38″N 96°06′13″W	Wharton	Historic and Architectural Resources of Wharton MPS
19	Edwin Hawes House	Edwin Hawes House	March 18, 1993 (#93000102)	309 N. Resident; 29°18′45″N 96°05′50″W	Wharton	Recorded Texas Historic Landmark
20	Edwin Hawes Jr. House		March 18, 1993 (#93000105)	119 S. Resident; 29°18′34″N 96°05′51″W	Wharton	Historic and Architectural Resources of Wharton MPS; demolished
21	House at 401 North Richmond	House at 401 North Richmond	March 18, 1993 (#93000107)	401 N. Richmond; 29°18′54″N 96°06′08″W	Wharton	Historic and Architectural Resources of Wharton MPS
22	House at 512 North Resident	House at 512 North Resident	March 18, 1993 (#93000103)	512 N. Resident; 29°18′54″N 96°05′43″W	Wharton	Historic and Architectural Resources of Wharton MPS
23	Linn Street Historic District	Linn Street Historic District	March 18, 1993 (#93000124)	Roughly, the 500 blocks of Richmond Rd. and Houston St. and the 100-200 blocks of Linn St. 29°18′56″N 96°05′59″W	Wharton	Historic and Architectural Resources of Wharton MPS
24	Merrell-Roten House	Merrell-Roten House	March 18, 1993 (#93000113)	520 Ave. A 29°18′56″N 96°05′34″W	Wharton	Historic and Architectural Resources of Wharton MPS
25	Moran-Moore House	Moran-Moore House	March 18, 1993 (#93000120)	501 N. Walnut; 29°18′51″N 96°05′40″W	Wharton	Historic and Architectural Resources of Wharton MPS
26	J. H. Speaker House	J. H. Speaker House	March 18, 1993 (#93000109)	414 E. Alabama; 29°18′45″N 96°05′42″W	Wharton	Historic and Architectural Resources of Wharton MPS
27	St. John's Evangelical Lutheran Church	St. John's Evangelical Lutheran Church	March 18, 1993 (#93000100)	612 N. Pecan; 29°18′55″N 96°05′40″W	Wharton	Historic and Architectural Resources of Wharton MPS
28	Texas and New Orleans Railroad Bridge	Texas and New Orleans Railroad Bridge	March 18, 1993 (#93000123)	Southern Pacific RR tracks, 0.25 mi (0.40 km). W of Old US 59, over the Colorado R. 29°18′26″N 96°06′23″W	Wharton	Historic and Architectural Resources of Wharton MPS
29	Texas and New Orleans Railroad Depot	Texas and New Orleans Railroad Depot	March 18, 1993 (#93000119)	100 block of N. Sunset; 29°18′49″N 96°06′23″W	Wharton	Historic and Architectural Resources of Wharton MPS
30	West Milam Street Mercantile Historic District	West Milam Street Mercantile Historic District	March 18, 1993 (#93000125)	Roughly 637-668 W. Milam St. 29°18′46″N 96°06′23″W	Wharton	Historic and Architectural Resources of Wharton MPS
31	Wharton County Courthouse Historic Commercial District	Wharton County Courthouse Historic Commercial District	November 5, 1991 (#91001624)	Roughly bounded by the alley N of Milam St., Rusk St., Elm St. and Richmond St. 29°18′38″N 96°06′03″W	Wharton	Includes State Antiquities Landmarks, Recorded Texas Historic Landmark
32	Louis F. Worthing House	Louis F. Worthing House	March 18, 1993 (#93000121)	620 N. Walnut; 29°18′55″N 96°05′36″W	Wharton	Historic and Architectural Resources of Wharton MPS
