= National Register of Historic Places listings in Galveston County, Texas =

Location of Galveston County in Texas

This is intended to be a complete list of properties and districts listed on the National Register of Historic Places in Galveston County, Texas. There are 10 districts, 75 individual properties, and four former properties listed on the National Register in the county. Two districts and one individually listed property are National Historic Landmarks. One district and six individually listed properties are State Antiquities Landmarks. Seventy-two properties are Recorded Texas Historic Landmarks including one property that contains two while four districts contain many more.

Many of the below locations survived the Galveston hurricane of 1900 while all former listings were victims of later hurricanes.

This National Park Service list is complete through NPS recent listings posted June 19, 2026.

== Current listings ==
The publicly disclosed locations of National Register properties and districts may be seen in a mapping service provided.

	Name on the Register	Image	Date listed	Location	City or town	Description
1	American National Insurance Company (ANICO)	American National Insurance Company (ANICO)	May 20, 2021 (#100006539)	1 Moody Ave. (1902 Market St.); 29°18′24″N 94°47′24″W	Galveston	AKA One Moody Plaza.
2	Ashton Villa	Ashton Villa	October 28, 1969 (#69000204)	2328 Broadway; 29°17′59″N 94°47′33″W	Galveston	Recorded Texas Historic Landmark
3	Bayou Brae Historic District		May 24, 2021 (#100006547)	All properties on Bayou Dr., Brae Ln., Coryell St., Oboe Trail, Woodwind Way, and Viola Dr. 29°31′36″N 95°04′35″W	League City	
4	Henry Beissner House	Henry Beissner House	April 3, 1978 (#78002929)	2818 Ball Ave. 29°18′01″N 94°47′56″W	Galveston	
5	Bishop's Palace	Bishop's Palace	August 25, 1970 (#70000746)	1402 Ave. J (Broadway); 29°18′17″N 94°46′55″W	Galveston	Recorded Texas Historic Landmark, part of East End Historic District
6	Broadway Cemetery Historic District	Broadway Cemetery Historic District	June 13, 2014 (#14000340)	6 blocks between Broadway Ave., Ave. L, 43rd & 40th Sts. 29°17′37″N 94°48′46″W	Galveston	
7	Wegner Brothers Building	Wegner Brothers Building	August 14, 1984 (#84001671)	1921–1921 1/2 Ave. D 29°18′21″N 94°47′23″W	Galveston	Historic Resources of the Galveston Central Business District MRA
8	Building at 1925–1927 Market Street	Building at 1925–1927 Market Street	August 14, 1984 (#84001668)	1925–1927 Market St. 29°18′25″N 94°47′29″W	Galveston	Historic Resources of the Galveston Central Business District MRA
9	Cedar Lawn Historic District	Cedar Lawn Historic District	December 20, 2002 (#02001570)	Bounded by 45th. St., 48th St., Ave. L, and Ave. N, 29°17′23″N 94°49′04″W	Galveston	
10	Christensen Castle		June 4, 2025 (#100011883)	12902 Hwy. 6; 29°22′32″N 95°05′48″W	Santa Fe	
11	City Hall	City Hall	August 14, 1984 (#84001676)	823 25th St. 29°18′01″N 94°47′43″W	Galveston	Historic Resources of the Galveston Central Business District MRA
12	City National Bank	City National Bank	August 14, 1984 (#84001680)	2219 Market St; 29°18′20″N 94°47′36″W	Galveston	Historic Resources of the Galveston Central Business District MRA
13	Congregation Beth Jacob	Congregation Beth Jacob	January 4, 2024 (#100009737)	2401 Avenue K 29°17′55″N 94°47′34″W	Galveston	
14	Frank B. Davison House	Frank B. Davison House	June 29, 1976 (#76002033)	109 3rd Ave. 29°23′13″N 94°53′42″W	Texas City	State Antiquities Landmark, Recorded Texas Historic Landmark
15	Denver Court Historic District	Denver Court Historic District	January 14, 2002 (#01001471)	Roughly bounded by Aves. S1/2 and U1/2, 43rd and 52nd Sts. 29°16′39″N 94°48′54″W	Galveston	
16	East End Historic District	East End Historic District	May 30, 1975 (#75001979)	Irregular pattern including both sides of Broadway and Market Sts. 29°18′16″N 94°46′58″W	Galveston	Includes Recorded Texas Historic Landmarks
17	Eiband's	Eiband's	August 14, 1984 (#84001683)	2001 Central Plaza; 29°18′16″N 94°47′32″W	Galveston	Historic Resources of the Galveston Central Business District MRA
18	ELISSA	ELISSA	March 21, 1978 (#78002930)	Pier 21, 21st Street and Harborside Drive; 29°18′34″N 94°47′37″W	Galveston	
19	Falstaff Brewery	Falstaff Brewery	August 29, 2018 (#100002841)	3302 Church St. (Ave. F); 29°18′03″N 94°48′22″W	Galveston	This structure is currently abandoned
20	First Evangelical Lutheran Church	First Evangelical Lutheran Church	August 14, 1984 (#84001688)	2401 Ave. G 29°18′09″N 94°47′39″W	Galveston	Recorded Texas Historic Landmark; Historic Resources of the Galveston Central Business District MRA
21	First Presbyterian Church	First Presbyterian Church	January 29, 1979 (#79002942)	1903 Church St. 29°18′15″N 94°47′19″W	Galveston	Recorded Texas Historic Landmark
22	Fort Travis	Fort Travis	March 30, 2005 (#05000247)	TX 87 at Loop 108; 29°21′53″N 94°45′29″W	Port Bolivar	State Antiquities Landmark
23	Galveston Causeway	Galveston Causeway	December 12, 1976 (#76002028)	Spans Galveston Bay from Virginia Point to Galveston Island; 29°17′51″N 94°53′12″W	Galveston	State Antiquities Landmark
24	Galveston, Houston & Henderson (GH&H) Freight Depot	Galveston, Houston & Henderson (GH&H) Freight Depot	January 10, 2020 (#100004866)	325 33rd St. 29°18′09″N 94°48′20″W	Galveston	
25	Galveston Orphans Home	Galveston Orphans Home	March 21, 1979 (#79002943)	1315 21st St. 29°17′50″N 94°47′19″W	Galveston	Recorded Texas Historic Landmark
26	Galveston Seawall	Galveston Seawall	August 18, 1977 (#77001443)	Seawall Blvd. 29°18′09″N 94°46′27″W	Galveston	State Antiquities Landmark
27	Galveston US Post Office, Custom House and Courthouse	Galveston US Post Office, Custom House and Courthouse	April 25, 2001 (#01000438)	601 25th St. (Rosenberg St.); 29°18′08″N 94°47′45″W	Galveston	
28	Galvez Hotel	Galvez Hotel	April 4, 1979 (#79002944)	2024 Seawall Blvd. 29°17′32″N 94°47′08″W	Galveston	Recorded Texas Historic Landmark
29	Garten Verein Pavilion	Garten Verein Pavilion	July 20, 1977 (#77001444)	27th St. and Avenue O (Kempner Park); 29°17′34″N 94°47′41″W	Galveston	State Antiquities Landmark, Recorded Texas Historic Landmark
30	Grace Episcopal Church	Grace Episcopal Church	April 3, 1975 (#75001980)	1115 36th St. 29°17′39″N 94°48′23″W	Galveston	Recorded Texas Historic Landmark
31	Grand Opera House	Grand Opera House	January 2, 1974 (#74002071)	2012–2020 Ave. E 29°17′47″N 94°47′26″W	Galveston	Recorded Texas Historic Landmark
32	John Hagemann House	John Hagemann House	June 1, 1982 (#82004505)	3301 Ave. L 29°17′40″N 94°48′47″W	Galveston	Recorded Texas Historic Landmark
33	House at 2017–2023 Avenue I	House at 2017–2023 Avenue I	August 14, 1984 (#84001698)	2017–2023 Ave. I 29°18′05″N 94°47′07″W	Galveston	Historic Resources of the Galveston Central Business District MRA
34	House at 2528 Postoffice St.	House at 2528 Postoffice St.	August 14, 1984 (#84001700)	2528 Postoffice St. 29°18′13″N 94°47′49″W	Galveston	Historic Resources of the Galveston Central Business District MRA
35	Sealy Hutchings House	Sealy Hutchings House	July 29, 1994 (#94000796)	2805 Ave. O 29°17′31″N 94°47′44″W	Galveston	
36	I.O.O.F. Lodge	I.O.O.F. Lodge	August 14, 1984 (#84001703)	505 20th St. 29°18′18″N 94°47′24″W	Galveston	Historic Resources of the Galveston Central Business District MRA
37	Illies Building-Justine Apartments	Illies Building-Justine Apartments	August 22, 1995 (#95001028)	503 21st St. 29°17′49″N 94°46′56″W	Galveston	Historic Resources of the Galveston Central Business District MRA
38	Daniel Webster Kempner House	Daniel Webster Kempner House	March 30, 1979 (#79002945)	2504 Ave. O 29°17′35″N 94°47′34″W	Galveston	Part of Silk Stocking Residential Historic District
39	Jean Lafitte Hotel	Jean Lafitte Hotel	August 14, 1984 (#84001705)	2105 Ave. F 29°18′14″N 94°47′27″W	Galveston	Historic Resources of the Galveston Central Business District MRA
40	Lasker Home for Homeless Children	Lasker Home for Homeless Children	April 14, 1983 (#83003140)	1019 16th St. 29°18′02″N 94°47′01″W	Galveston	Recorded Texas Historic Landmark; part of Lost Bayou Historic District
41	E.S. Levy Building	E.S. Levy Building	November 13, 2003 (#03001163)	2221–2225 Market St. 29°18′17″N 94°47′36″W	Galveston	Historic Resources of the Galveston Central Business District MRA
42	Lost Bayou Historic District	Lost Bayou Historic District	June 19, 2017 (#100001224)	Roughly bounded by Broadway, Ave. N, 14th & 21st Sts. 29°17′58″N 94°47′06″W	Galveston	Includes Recorded Texas Historic Landmarks
43	Marschner Building	Marschner Building	August 14, 1984 (#84001706)	1914–1916 Mechanic St. 29°18′26″N 94°47′23″W	Galveston	Recorded Texas Historic Landmark; Historic Resources of the Galveston Central Business District MRA
44	McKinney-McDonald House	McKinney-McDonald House	May 4, 1976 (#76002030)	926 Winnie St. 29°18′24″N 94°46′39″W	Galveston	
45	Melrose Apartment Building	Melrose Apartment Building	October 14, 1998 (#98001246)	2002 Post Office St. 29°18′19″N 94°47′26″W	Galveston	Historic Resources of the Galveston Central Business District MRA
46	Michel B. Menard House	Michel B. Menard House	December 12, 1976 (#76002031)	1605 33rd St. 29°17′27″N 94°48′06″W	Galveston	
47	Merimax Building	Merimax Building	January 24, 1985 (#85000121)	521 22nd St. 29°18′15″N 94°47′32″W	Galveston	Historic Resources of the Galveston Central Business District MRA
48	Model Laundry	Model Laundry	August 14, 1984 (#84001707)	513–523 25th St. 29°18′10″N 94°47′45″W	Galveston	Historic Resources of the Galveston Central Business District MRA
49	Col. Hugh B. and Helen Moore House	Col. Hugh B. and Helen Moore House	October 28, 1994 (#94001241)	8 Ninth Ave., N. 29°23′38″N 94°54′10″W	Texas City	Recorded Texas Historic Landmark
50	Mosquito Fleet Berth, Pier 19	Mosquito Fleet Berth, Pier 19	April 21, 1975 (#75001981)	N end of 20th St., Pier 19; 29°18′39″N 94°47′25″W	Galveston	State Antiquities Landmark
51	Old Galveston Customhouse	Old Galveston Customhouse	August 25, 1970 (#70000747)	Southeast corner 20th and Post Office (Ave. E) Sts. 29°18′18″N 94°47′23″W	Galveston	
52	Parkland Apartments		January 7, 2022 (#100007354)	3916 Winnie St. (Ave. G); 29°17′52″N 94°48′43″W	Galveston	
53	Pix Building	Pix Building	August 14, 1984 (#84001713)	2128 Postoffice St. 29°18′18″N 94°47′32″W	Galveston	Historic Resources of the Galveston Central Business District MRA
54	Point Bolivar Lighthouse	Point Bolivar Lighthouse	August 18, 1977 (#77001445)	TX 87; 29°22′00″N 94°46′00″W	Port Bolivar	
55	Powhatan House	Powhatan House	October 6, 1975 (#75001982)	3427 Ave. O 29°17′24″N 94°48′11″W	Galveston	Recorded Texas Historic Landmark
56	Quigg-Baulard House	Quigg-Baulard House	September 17, 2015 (#15000618)	2628 Broadway; 29°17′57″N 94°47′48″W	Galveston	Recorded Texas Historic Landmark
57	Reedy Chapel-AME Church	Reedy Chapel-AME Church	September 14, 1984 (#84001717)	2013 Broadway; 29°18′00″N 94°47′19″W	Galveston	Recorded Texas Historic Landmark
58	Robinson Building	Robinson Building	August 14, 1984 (#84001720)	2009–2011 Postoffice St. 29°18′17″N 94°47′26″W	Galveston	Historic Resources of the Galveston Central Business District MRA
59	Rosenberg Library	Rosenberg Library	August 14, 1984 (#84001722)	2310 Sealy St. 29°18′03″N 94°47′34″W	Galveston	Historic Resources of the Galveston Central Business District MRA
60	Rosewood Cemetery		February 9, 2024 (#100009946)	2825 63rd Street; 29°16′24″N 94°49′56″W	Galveston	
61	St. Augustine of Hippo Episcopal Church		June 24, 2026 (#100012718)	1402 41st Street; 29°17′27″N 94°48′41″W	Galveston	
62	Scottish Rite Cathedral	Scottish Rite Cathedral	August 14, 1984 (#84001724)	2128 Church St. 29°18′14″N 94°47′30″W	Galveston	Historic Resources of the Galveston Central Business District MRA
63	George Sealy House	George Sealy House	October 28, 1969 (#69000205)	2424 Broadway; 29°17′59″N 94°47′37″W	Galveston	Recorded Texas Historic Landmark
64	The Settlement Historic District	The Settlement Historic District	May 17, 2010 (#10000268)	Centered on the intersection of N Bell Dr and the 100 block of S Bell Dr with cross-streets Carver Ave and Eunice St; 29°22′58″N 94°58′38″W	Texas City	
65	M. W. Shaw Building	M. W. Shaw Building	August 14, 1984 (#84001728)	2427 Ave. D 29°18′16″N 94°47′45″W	Galveston	Historic Resources of the Galveston Central Business District MRA
66	Silk Stocking Residential Historic District	Silk Stocking Residential Historic District	May 10, 1996 (#96000539)	Roughly bounded by Ave. K, 23rd St., Ave. P, and 26th St. 29°17′42″N 94°47′30″W	Galveston	Includes Recorded Texas Historic Landmarks
67	Ashbel Smith Building	Ashbel Smith Building	October 28, 1969 (#69000203)	914–916 Ave. B 29°18′48″N 94°46′44″W	Galveston	State Antiquities Landmark, Recorded Texas Historic Landmark
68	SS SELMA (steamship)	SS SELMA (steamship)	January 5, 1994 (#93001449)	Within the channel between Galveston and Port Bolivar; 29°20′39″N 94°47′11″W	Galveston	
69	St. Joseph's Church	St. Joseph's Church	December 12, 1976 (#76002032)	2202 Ave. K 29°17′57″N 94°47′26″W	Galveston	Recorded Texas Historic Landmark
70	St. Mary's Cathedral	St. Mary's Cathedral	June 4, 1973 (#73001964)	2011 Church Ave. 29°18′14″N 94°47′24″W	Galveston	Recorded Texas Historic Landmark
71	Star Drug Store	Star Drug Store	August 14, 1984 (#84001731)	510 23rd St. 29°18′14″N 94°47′35″W	Galveston	Historic Resources of the Galveston Central Business District MRA
72	Steffens-Drewa House Complex	Steffens-Drewa House Complex	December 1, 1988 (#88002671)	2701, 2705, and 2709 Ave. O 29°17′32″N 94°47′40″W	Galveston	
73	The Strand Historic District	The Strand Historic District	January 26, 1970 (#70000748)	Roughly bounded by Ave. A, 20th St., alley between Aves. C and D, and railroad depot 29°18′23″N 94°47′37″W	Galveston	Includes Recorded Texas Historic Landmarks
74	Stringfellow Orchards	Stringfellow Orchards	February 27, 2013 (#13000043)	7902 TX 6; 29°21′00″N 95°01′01″W	Hitchcock	
75	Sweeney-Royston House	Sweeney-Royston House	September 1, 1978 (#78002931)	2402 Ave. L 29°17′52″N 94°47′32″W	Galveston	Recorded Texas Historic Landmark; part of Silk Stocking Residential Historic District
76	Texas Building	Texas Building	August 14, 1984 (#84001734)	2200 Central Plaza; 29°18′18″N 94°47′33″W	Galveston	Historic Resources of the Galveston Central Business District MRA
77	Texas Heroes Monument	Texas Heroes Monument	August 14, 1984 (#84001737)	25th and Broadway; 29°17′57″N 94°47′39″W	Galveston	Historic Resources of the Galveston Central Business District MRA
78	Trinity Protestant Episcopal Church	Trinity Protestant Episcopal Church	September 4, 1979 (#79002946)	22nd St. and Ave. G 29°18′08″N 94°47′31″W	Galveston	Includes Recorded Texas Historic Landmarks
79	Trueheart-Adriance Building	Trueheart-Adriance Building	July 14, 1971 (#71000933)	212 22nd St. 29°18′24″N 94°47′33″W	Galveston	Recorded Texas Historic Landmark; part of The Strand Historic District
80	U.S. National Bank	U.S. National Bank	August 14, 1984 (#84001739)	2201 Ave. D 29°18′19″N 94°47′34″W	Galveston	Historic Resources of the Galveston Central Business District MRA
81	USS CAVALLA (submarine)	USS CAVALLA (submarine)	May 27, 2008 (#08000477)	East End of Seawolf Park; 29°20′09″N 94°46′46″W	Galveston	
82	USS HATTERAS (41GV68)	USS HATTERAS (41GV68)	January 28, 1977 (#77001567)	Address restricted	Galveston	Sunk 20 miles (32 km) off the Galveston coast during the Civil War.
83	USS STEWART	USS STEWART	July 12, 2007 (#07000689)	East End of Seawolf Park; 29°20′09″N 94°46′46″W	Galveston	
84	Samuel May Williams House	Samuel May Williams House	July 14, 1971 (#71000934)	3601 Ave. P 29°17′16″N 94°48′15″W	Galveston	Recorded Texas Historic Landmark
85	Willis-Moody Mansion	Willis-Moody Mansion	May 13, 1994 (#94000410)	2618 Broadway; 29°17′57″N 94°47′46″W	Galveston	Recorded Texas Historic Landmark

== Former listings ==
Four sites have been removed from the Register in Galveston County, three of which are due to being destroyed by Hurricane Ike in 2008.

	Name on the Register	Image	Date listed	Date removed	Location	City or town	Description
1	Balinese Room	Balinese Room	April 2, 1997 (#97000258)	January 8, 2009	2107 Seawall Blvd. 29°17′23″N 94°47′07″W	Galveston	Destroyed by Hurricane Ike on September 12, 2008.
2	The Breakers		October 10, 1998 (#98001225)	January 8, 2009	TX 87 W. of Gilchrist; 29°29′47″N 94°31′44″W	Caplen	Destroyed by Hurricane Ike on September 13, 2008
3	Moser House	Moser House	August 14, 1984 (#84001711)	January 8, 2009	509 19th St. 29°18′18″N 94°47′21″W	Caplen	Destroyed by fire during Hurricane Ike on September 12, 2008.
4	Ursuline Academy	Ursuline Academy	January 7, 1972 (#72001546)	September 17, 1973	2601 Ave. N 29°17′39″N 94°47′40″W	Galveston	Critically damaged by Hurricane Carla; demolished in 1974

== See also ==
- National Register of Historic Places listings in Texas
- Recorded Texas Historic Landmarks in Galveston County
