= Jean Lafitte (disambiguation) =

Jean Lafitte was a French pirate and privateer. The name may also refer to:

- Jean Lafitte, Louisiana, United States, a town
- Jean Lafitte Hotel, Galveston, Texas, United States, on the National Register of Historic Places
- SS Jean Lafitte (1942), transferred to the United States Navy as the attack transport USS Warren, later a container ship
- SS Jean Lafitte (1943), a War Shipping Administration troop transport (1943–1946)

== See also ==
- Jean Lafitte National Historical Park and Preserve, Louisiana
- Jean Laffitte (born 1952), French Catholic prelate and bishop
