= City National Bank (Galveston, Texas) =

- U.S. National Register of Historic Places
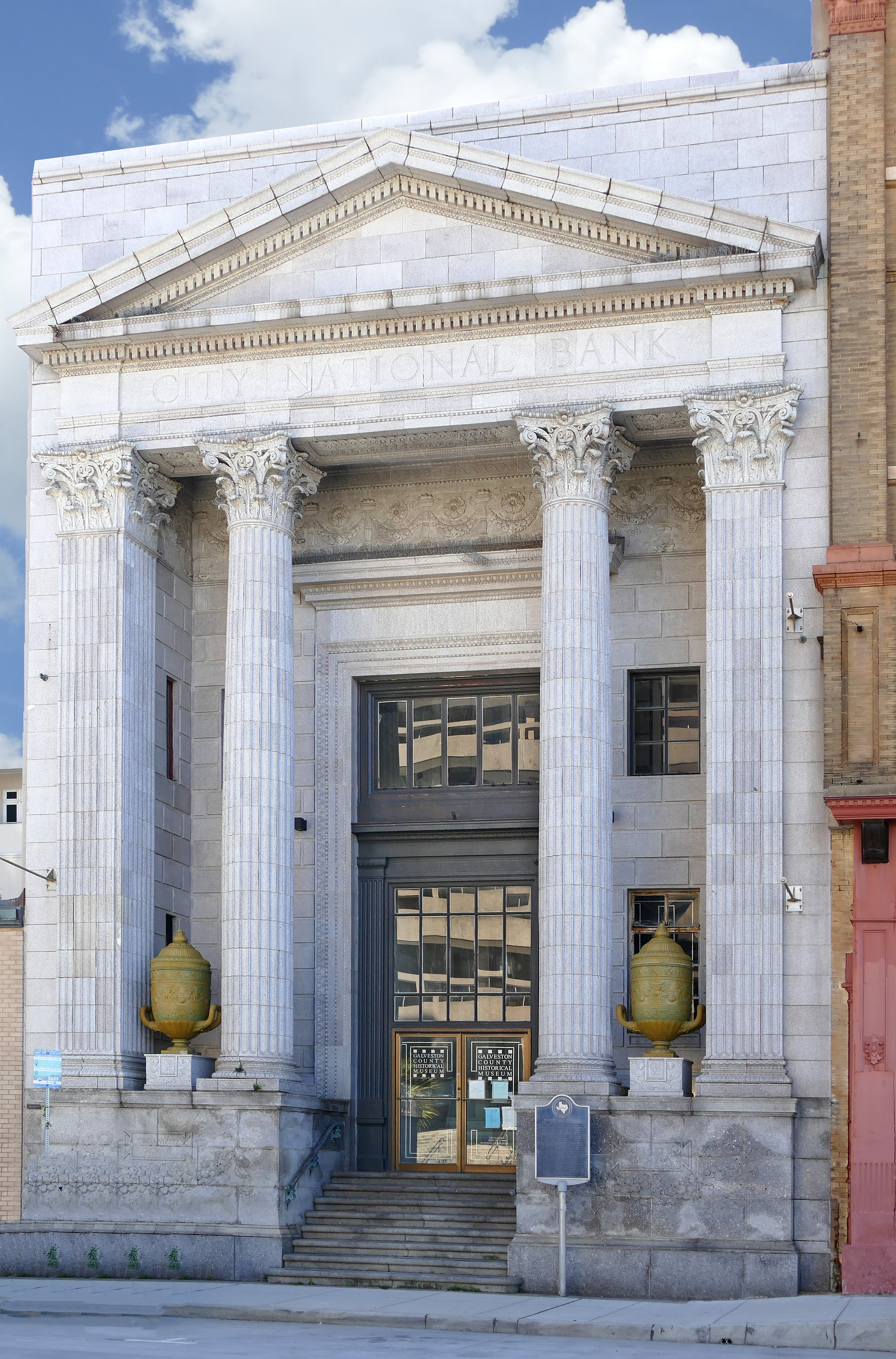
- City National Bank

- Location within Texas Location within the United States
- Location: 2219 Market St. Galveston, Texas
- Coordinates: 29°18′18″N 94°47′36″W
- Area: less than one acre
- Built: 1920
- Architect: Weary & Alford Company
- Architectural style: Classical Revival
- MPS: Central Business District MRACentral Business District MRA
- NRHP reference No.: 84001680
- Added to NRHP: August 14, 1984

The City National Bank (CNB) was a bank, and the name of the historic building in Galveston, Texas, United States and is listed on the National Register of Historic Places NRHP). The bank was founded in December 1907 by William Lewis Moody Jr. (1866–1954) and the building was completed in 1920. City National Bank renamed itself the Moody National Bank in 1953 to honor the founder. The downtown building served as the Galveston County Historical Museum until 2008 when it was badly damaged by Hurricane Ike, after which the museum's assets were moved to the Galveston County Courthouse. Since then the former CNB building has been unused.

== History ==
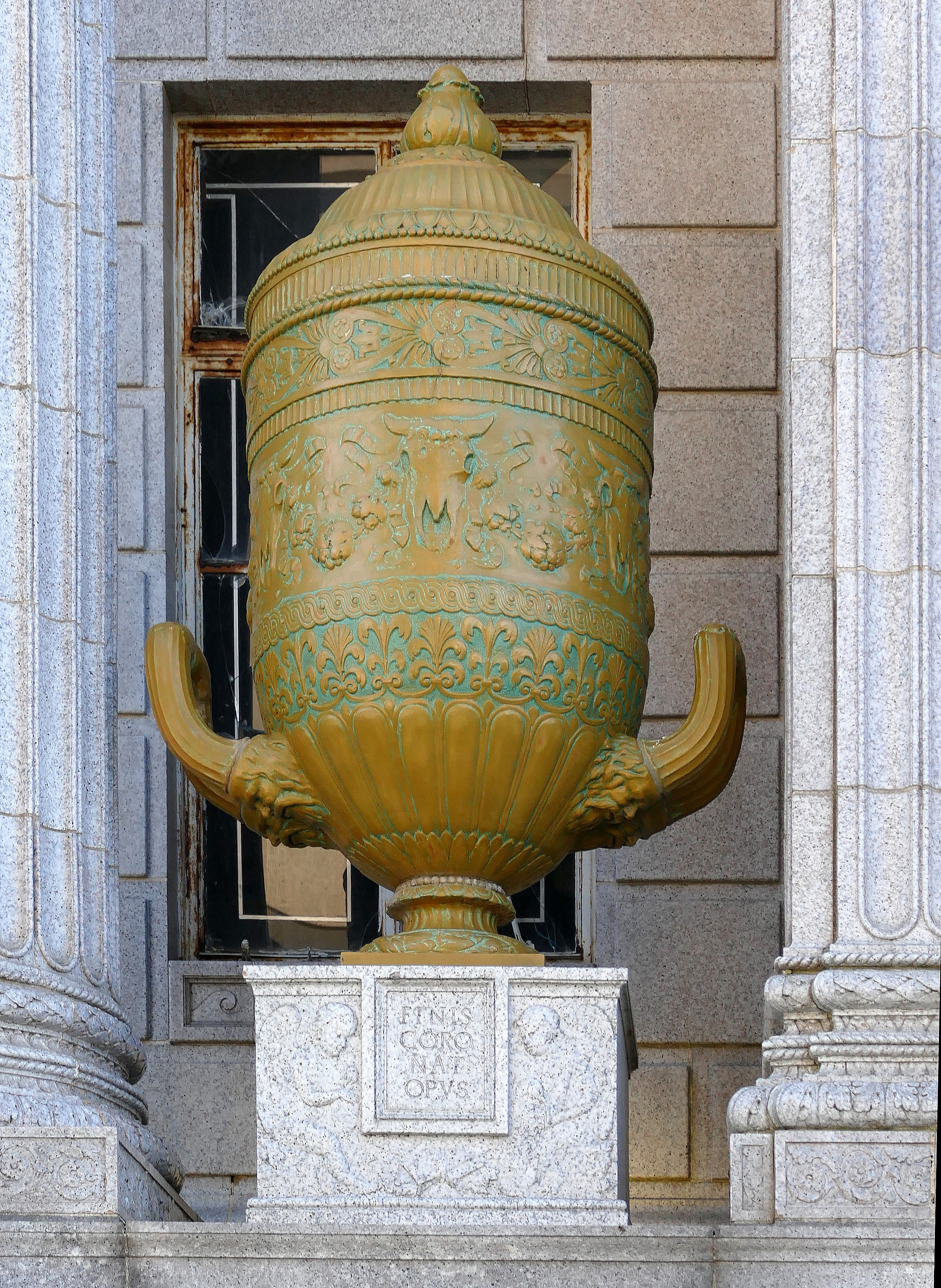
City National Bank, Galveston -- closeup of giant urns beside entryway

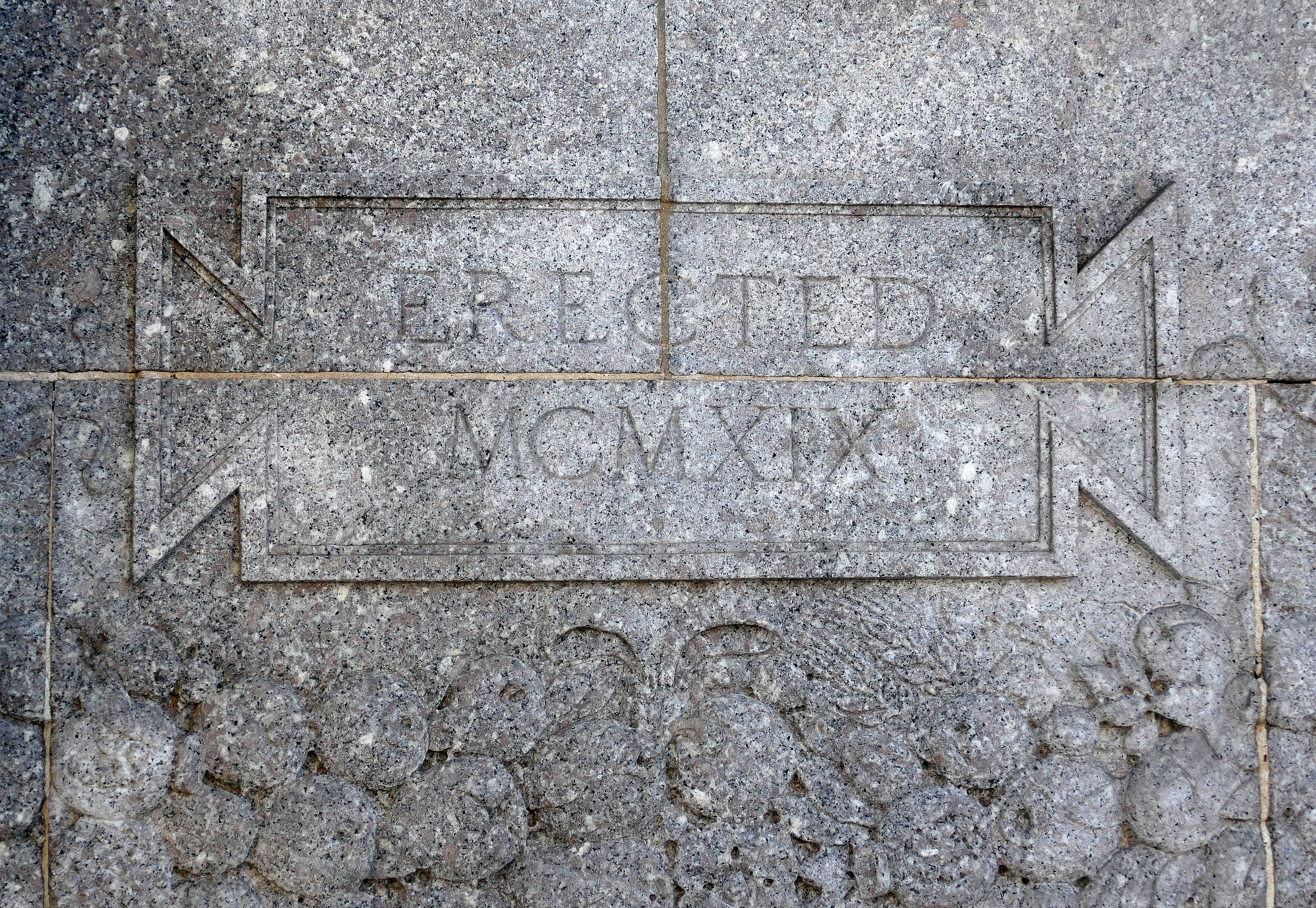
City National Bank -- stone carving of erection date on outer wall

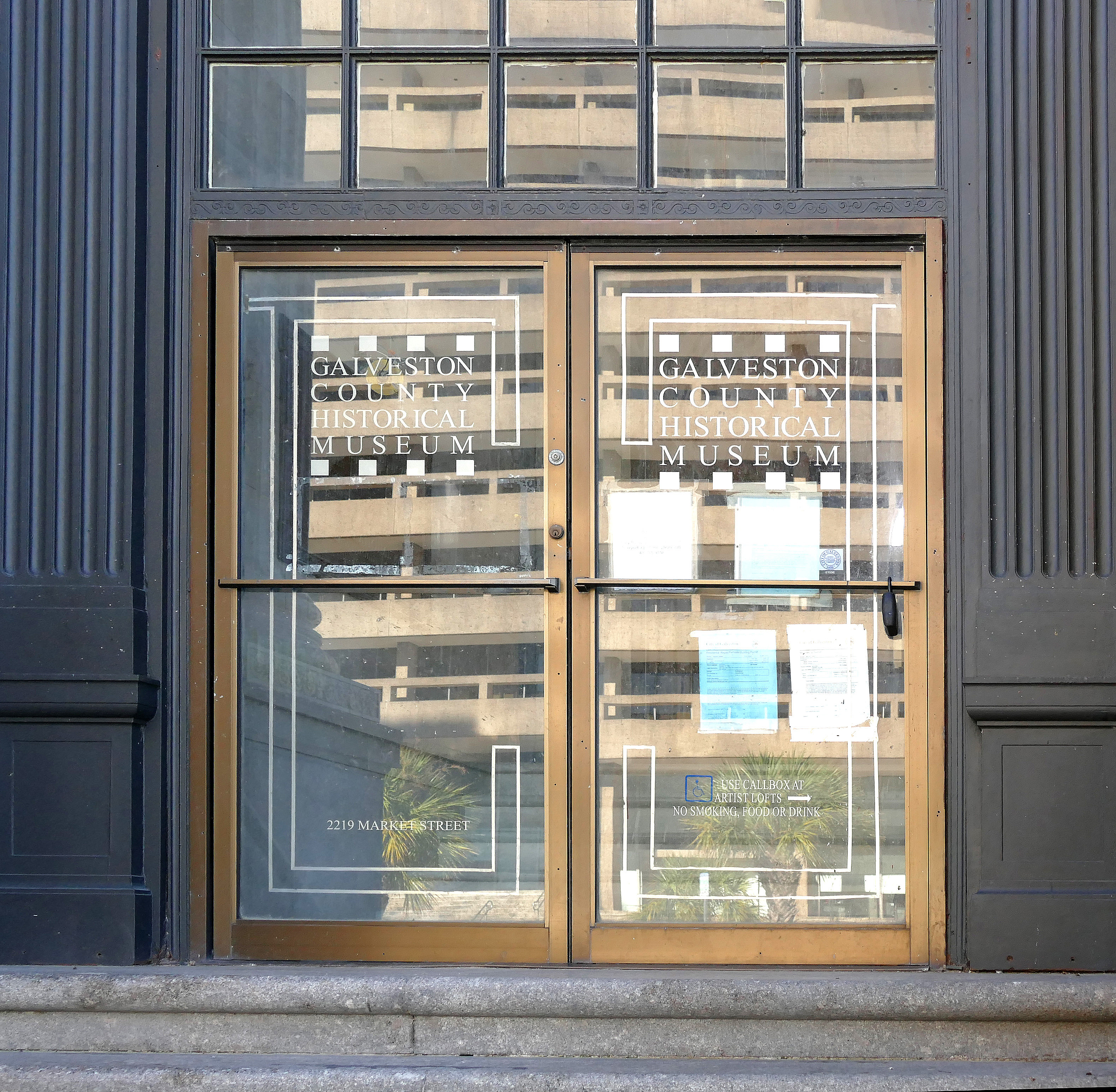
City National Bank, after that old Galveston Historical Museum

The bank began operating in a space leased in the Trust Building at 2228 Avenue E, but soon moved to another building at the intersection of Tremont and Market Streets, where it remained until 1920. William Lewis Moody Jr. commissioned a new bank building which was constructed in 1919–20. The building was a $200,000 structure built specifically for City National Bank at 2219 Avenue D (aka Market Street) in downtown Galveston. Its exterior has a pedimented portico with Corinthian columns and it has a barrel-vaulted interior.

The Moody family also built the Medical Arts Building (1927–29), and the Jean Lafitte Hotel (1927), among the biggest structures in Galveston. The hotel, in the Strand Historic District, is also NRHP-listed. And in the same block as the City National Bank is the U.S. National Bank (1923–25), an Italian Renaissance 11-story skyscraper building that is an "interesting contrast" architecturally, and was also listed in the study.

William Lewis Moody Jr. died on July 21, 1954. His will conveyed his estate to Mary Moody Northen (1892–1986), who was also the administrator. Northen assumed financial control of the Moody National Bank and was named its president in 1954. She donated the building to Galveston County in 1972, and in 1978, it opened as the Galveston County Historical Museum. The building suffered major destruction to its air and electrical systems caused by Hurricane Ike in 2008, after which the exhibits and artifacts were moved to the Galveston County Courthouse.

Moody National Bank's growth showed a need for more office space, so the organization had a new facility constructed at 2302 Post Office Street, where it remains at present. It vacated the 1920 structure, which was later donated to Galveston County.

The building was listed on the National Register as part of a collection covered in a study of the city's historic resources. The building was listed on the National Register of Historic Places in 1984.

== See also ==
- National Register of Historic Places listings in Galveston County, Texas
