= Scottish Rite Cathedral (Galveston, Texas) =

- U.S. National Register of Historic Places
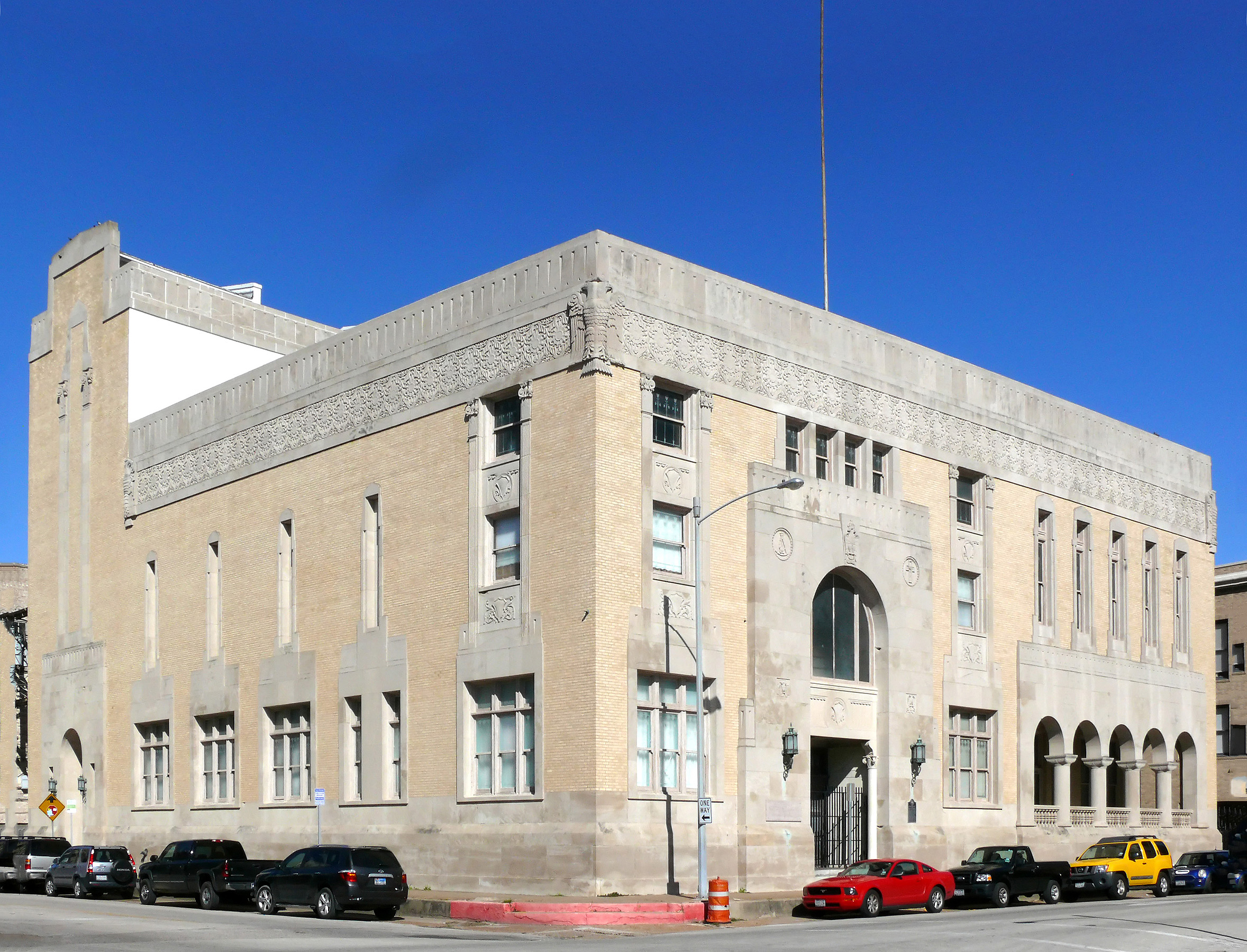
- Scottish Rite Cathedral in 2012

- Location within Texas Location within the United States
- Location: 2128 Church St., Galveston, Texas
- Coordinates: 29°18′14″N 94°47′30″W
- Area: less than one acre
- Built: 1928
- Architect: A.C. Finn
- Architectural style: Art Deco
- MPS: Central Business District MRACentral Business District MRA
- NRHP reference No.: 84001724
- Added to NRHP: August 14, 1984

The Scottish Rite Cathedral is a historic Scottish Rite Masonic building located at 2128 Church Street in Galveston, Texas. It was built in 1928 and added to the National Register of Historic Places in 1984.

== History ==
The Scottish Rite Masons previously occupied Harmony Hall, a building designed by noted architect Nicholas J. Clayton for the Harmony Club. Harmony Hall was destroyed by fire in 1928, prompting the Masons to commission a new structure.

The firm of Alfred C. Finn was selected for the project, with H. Jordan MacKenzie serving as the lead designer. The resulting building is an example of Art Deco architecture, clad in brick and stone, with a prominent loggia facing Church Street. Window placements were arranged to reflect the internal layout of the building. Decorative elements include copper doors and stone relief sculptures, adding to its architectural significance.

The cathedral has served as a meeting place for Scottish Rite Masons for nearly a century and remains a notable landmark in Galveston’s historic downtown district.

== See also ==
- National Register of Historic Places listings in Galveston County, Texas

== Bibliography ==
- Beasley, Ellen; Fox, Stephen (1996). Galveston Architectural Guidebook. Houston: Rice University Press. ISBN 0-89263-345-X.
