= Star Drug Store =

Historic building in Galveston, Texas, U.S.

- U.S. National Register of Historic Places
- Texas State Antiquities Landmark
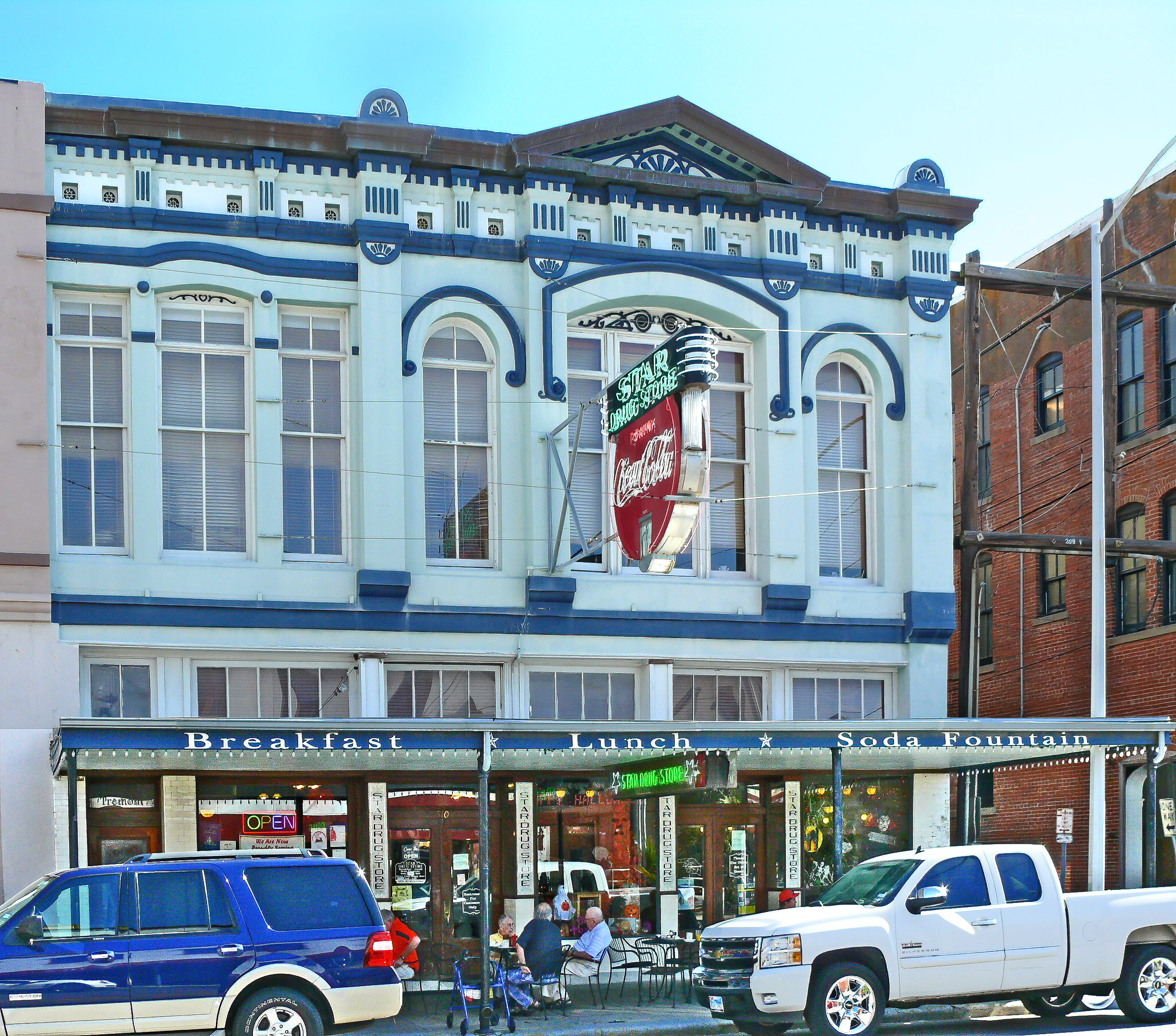
- Star Drug Store

- Location within Texas Location within the United States
- Location: 510 23rd Street, Galveston, Texas
- Coordinates: 29°18′14″N 94°47′35″W
- Area: Less than 1 acre
- Built: 1909
- Architect: Nicholas J. Clayton
- Architectural style: Victorian
- NRHP reference No.: 84001731
- TSAL No.
- Added to NRHP: August 14, 1984

Star Drug Star is a National Register of Historic Places-listed property in Galveston, Texas.

== History ==
The Star Drug Store building dates to the late 1880s, when the property was owned by Olympia Freybe. C. J. Michaelis, a drug store owner, moved his business to 510 23rd Street in 1906.

The owner of the property was the Scanlan family and managed by Kate Scanlan of Houston, who commissioned Nicholas J. Clayton to design the remodeling of the building around 1909. Clayton designed the adjacent Victorian building about decades earlier, and harmonized the facade of the two buildings with similar Neo-Greek ornaments in his treatment of the Star Drug Store.

Star Drug installed a U-shaped food and drink counter in 1917. A diner serving breakfast, lunch, and sodas persisted even after the drug business closed in the 1980s. In 1998, a fire in a neighboring building destroyed Star Drug. Natili Monsrud and her parents acquired the property in 2001 and embarked on a long-term restoration project that culminated in the re-opening of the diner in 2007. As of 2024, Star Drug operates as a diner and a gift shop.

== Gallery ==

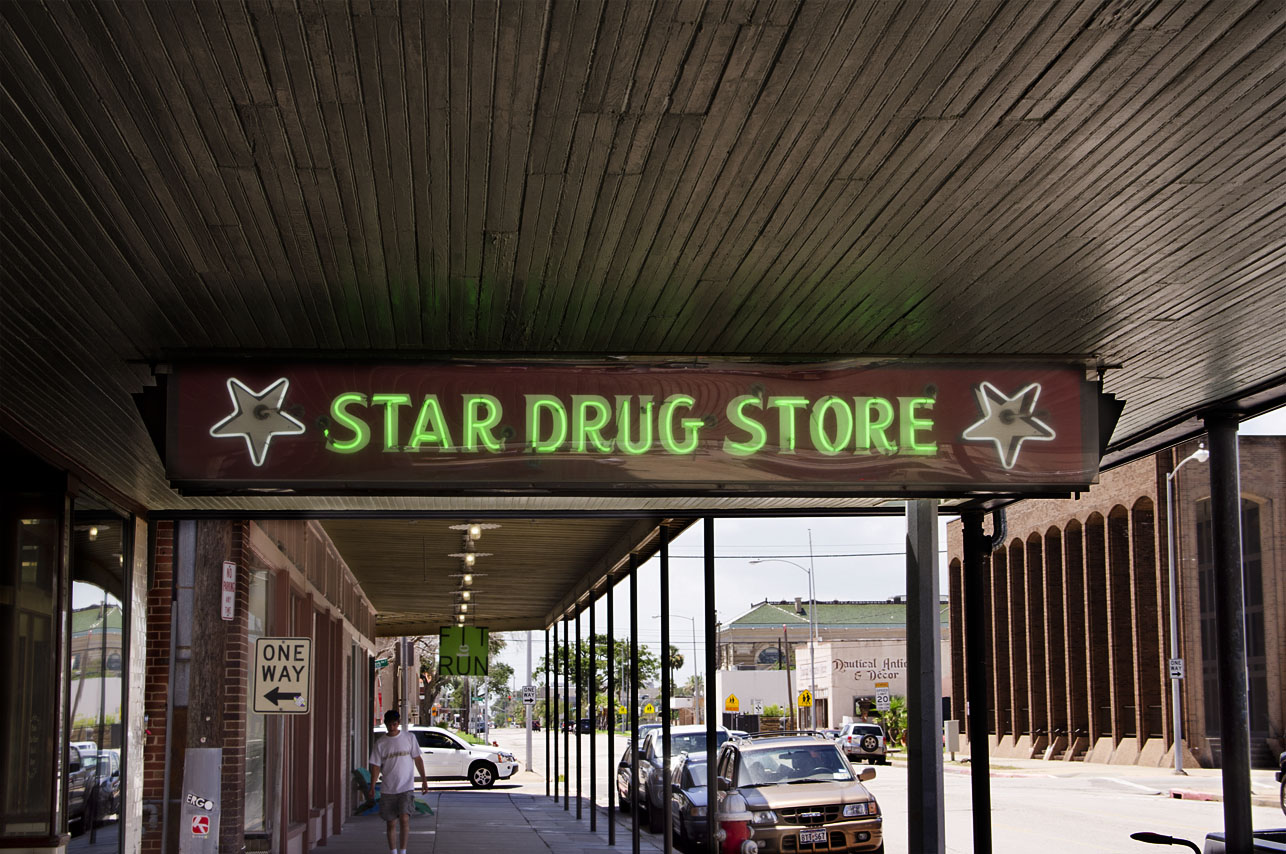

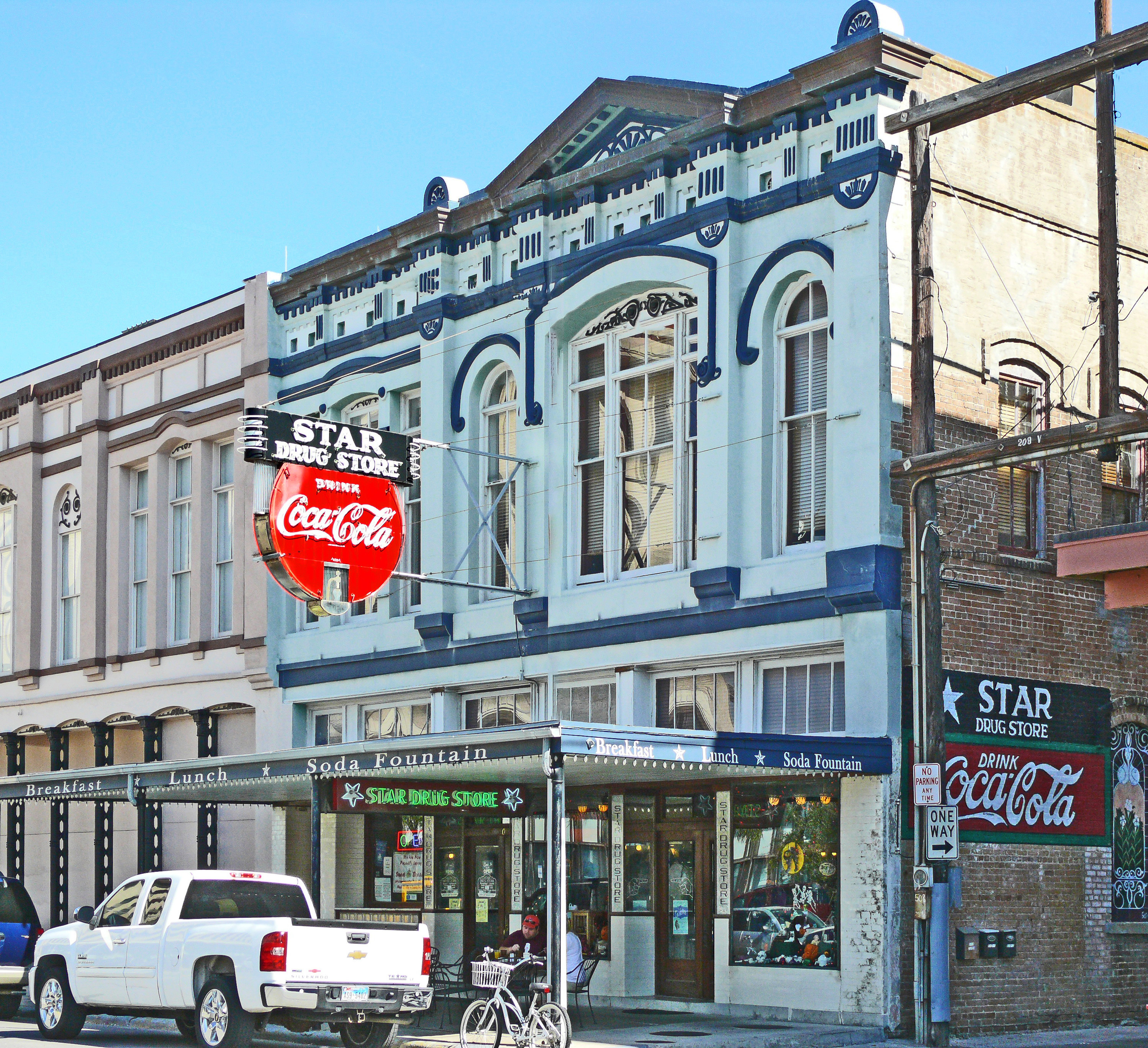

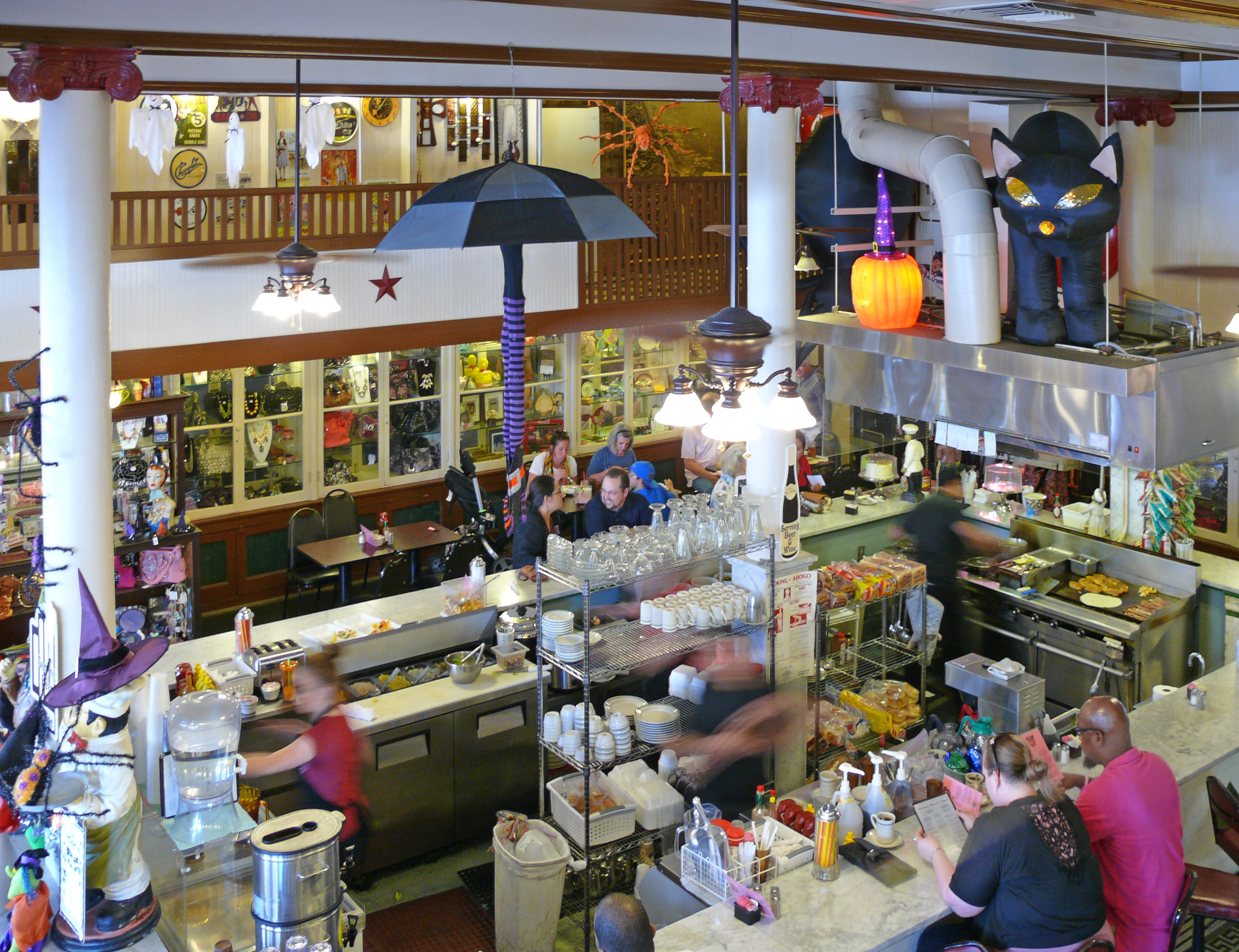

== See also ==
- National Register of Historic Places listings in Galveston County, Texas
- Recorded Texas Historic Landmarks in Galveston County

== Bibliography ==
- Beasley, Ellen; Fox, Stephen (1996). Galveston Architectural Guidebook. Houston: Rice University Press. ISBN 0-89263-345-X.
