= Garten Verein Pavilion =

Historic building in Galveston, Texas, USA

- U.S. National Register of Historic Places
- Recorded Texas Historic Landmark
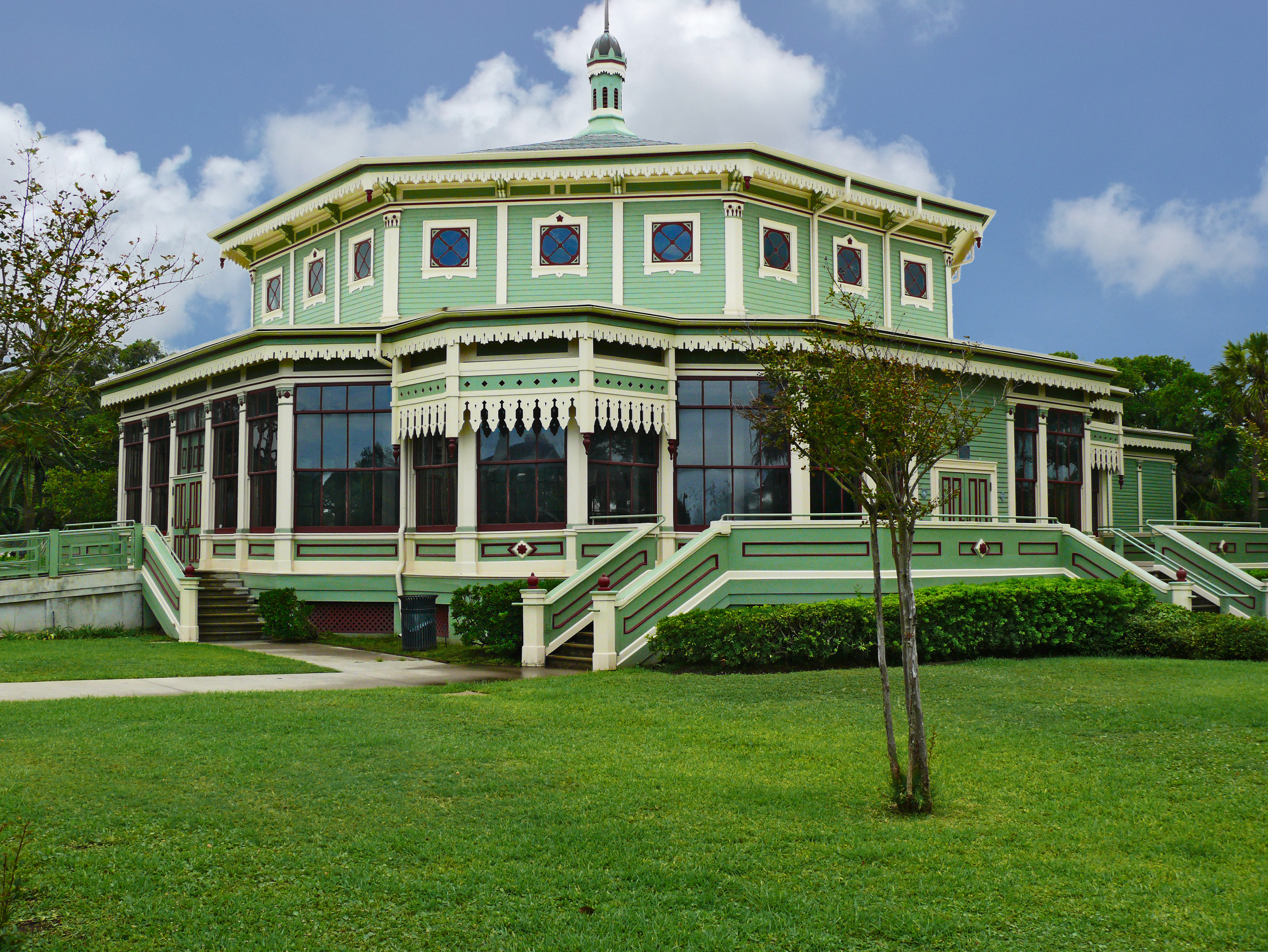
- Garten Verein Pavilion

- Location within Texas Location within the United States
- Location: 2704 Avenue O, Kempner Park, Galveston, Texas
- Coordinates: 29°17′34″N 94°47′41″W
- NRHP reference No.: 77001444
- Designated RTHL: July 27, 1977

The Garten Verein Pavilion is a National Register of Historic Places-listed property in Galveston, Texas.

== History ==
The Garten Verein Pavilion site was originally the homestead of Robert Mills, a leading financier of Texas before the Civil War. Financially ruined as a result of the Panic of 1873, the Galveston Garten-Verein, a German social club, acquired the Mills homestead in 1876. They converted the house to use as a club meeting hall, which included a bowling alley. They added a dance pavilion to the property in 1879, possibly designed by John Moser, a local German architect.

By 1895, the Garten Verein landscaped the area around the pavilion with lawns and lines of trees. In addition to the dance pavilion and bowling, entertainment included tennis and croquet.

== See also ==
- List of National Historic Landmarks in Texas
- National Register of Historic Places listings in Galveston County, Texas

== Bibliography ==
- Beasley, Ellen; Fox, Stephen (1996). Galveston Architectural Guidebook. Houston: Rice University Press. ISBN 0-89263-345-X.
