= Henry Beissner House =

Historic home in Galveston, Texas, USA

- U.S. National Register of Historic Places
- Recorded Texas Historic Landmark
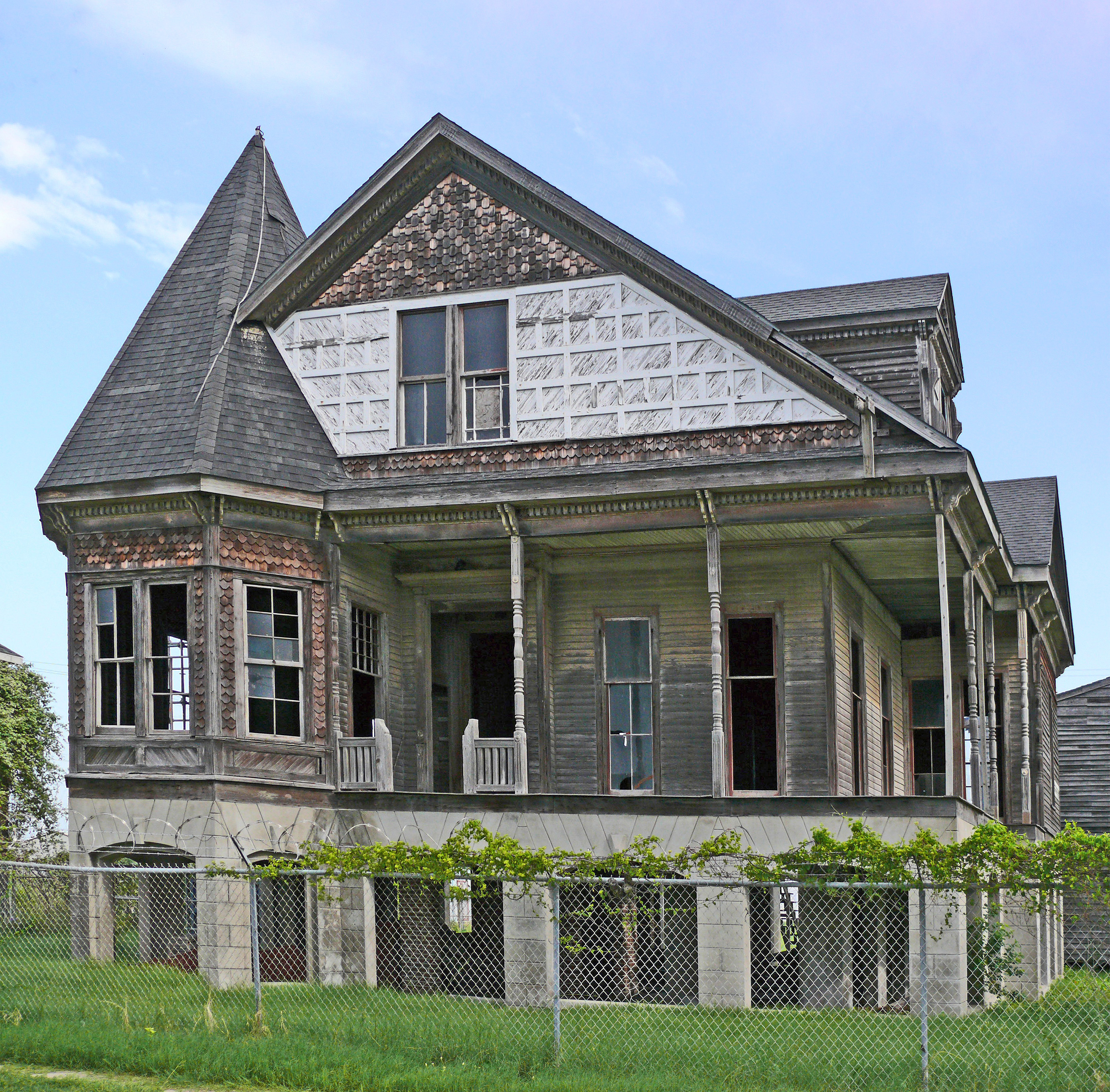
- Front view of the Henry Beissner House

- Location within Texas Location within the United States
- Location: 2818 Ball Avenue, Galveston, Texas
- Coordinates: 29.3003°N 94.7989°W
- Built: 1891
- Architectural style: Eastlake, Stick style, Queen Anne
- NRHP reference No.: 78002929

Significant dates
- Added to NRHP: April 3, 1978
- Designated RTHL: 1978

The Henry Beissner House is a historic residence located at 2818 Ball Avenue in Galveston, Texas. It is listed on the National Register of Historic Places and recognized as a Recorded Texas Historic Landmark.

== History ==
The house was built in 1891 by Galveston lumberman Henry Beissner. Its design stands out in the neighborhood for its elaborate architectural details, combining elements of Eastlake, Stick style, and Queen Anne architecture. The structure sits on a stone arch base, and its front gable features intricate woodwork uncommon in surrounding homes.

In 1996, a major renovation by Mardi J. Mitchell added a turret, further enhancing its distinctive appearance.

== See also ==
- List of National Historic Landmarks in Texas
- National Register of Historic Places listings in Galveston County, Texas

== Bibliography ==
- Beasley, Ellen; Fox, Stephen (1996). Galveston Architectural Guidebook. Houston: Rice University Press. ISBN 0-89263-345-X.
