= St. Joseph's Church (Galveston, Texas) =

Historic church in Texas, United States

- U.S. National Register of Historic Places
- Recorded Texas Historic Landmark
- Location within Texas Location within the United States
- Location: 2202 Ave. K, Galveston, Texas
- Coordinates: 29°17′57″N 94°47′26″W
- Area: 0.5 acres (0.20 ha)
- Built: 1860
- Architect: Joseph Bleicke
- Architectural style: Gothic
- NRHP reference No.: 76002032
- RTHL No.: 14117

Significant dates
- Added to NRHP: December 12, 1976
- Designated RTHL: 1978

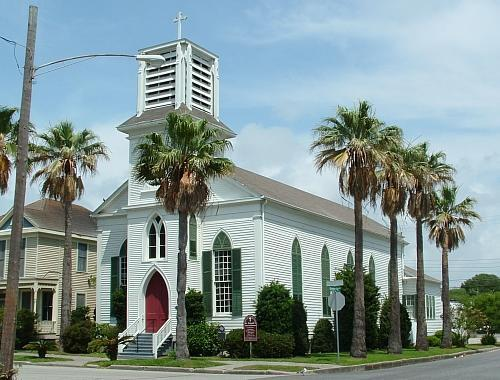
St. Joseph German Catholic Church Galveston.jpg

St. Joseph's Church is a historic church at 2202 Avenue K in Galveston, Texas. It is the oldest German Catholic church in Texas and one of the oldest buildings in Galveston.

== History ==
St. Joseph's Church was built upon the recommendation of Bishop John Odin in 1860 and dedicated to Saint Joseph. It was added to the National Register in 1976.

== See also ==
- National Register of Historic Places listings in Galveston County, Texas
- Recorded Texas Historic Landmarks in Galveston County
