= Reedy Chapel A.M.E. Church =

Historic church in Texas, United States

Coordinates: 29.300623°N 94.789009°W

- U.S. National Register of Historic Places
- Recorded Texas Historic Landmark
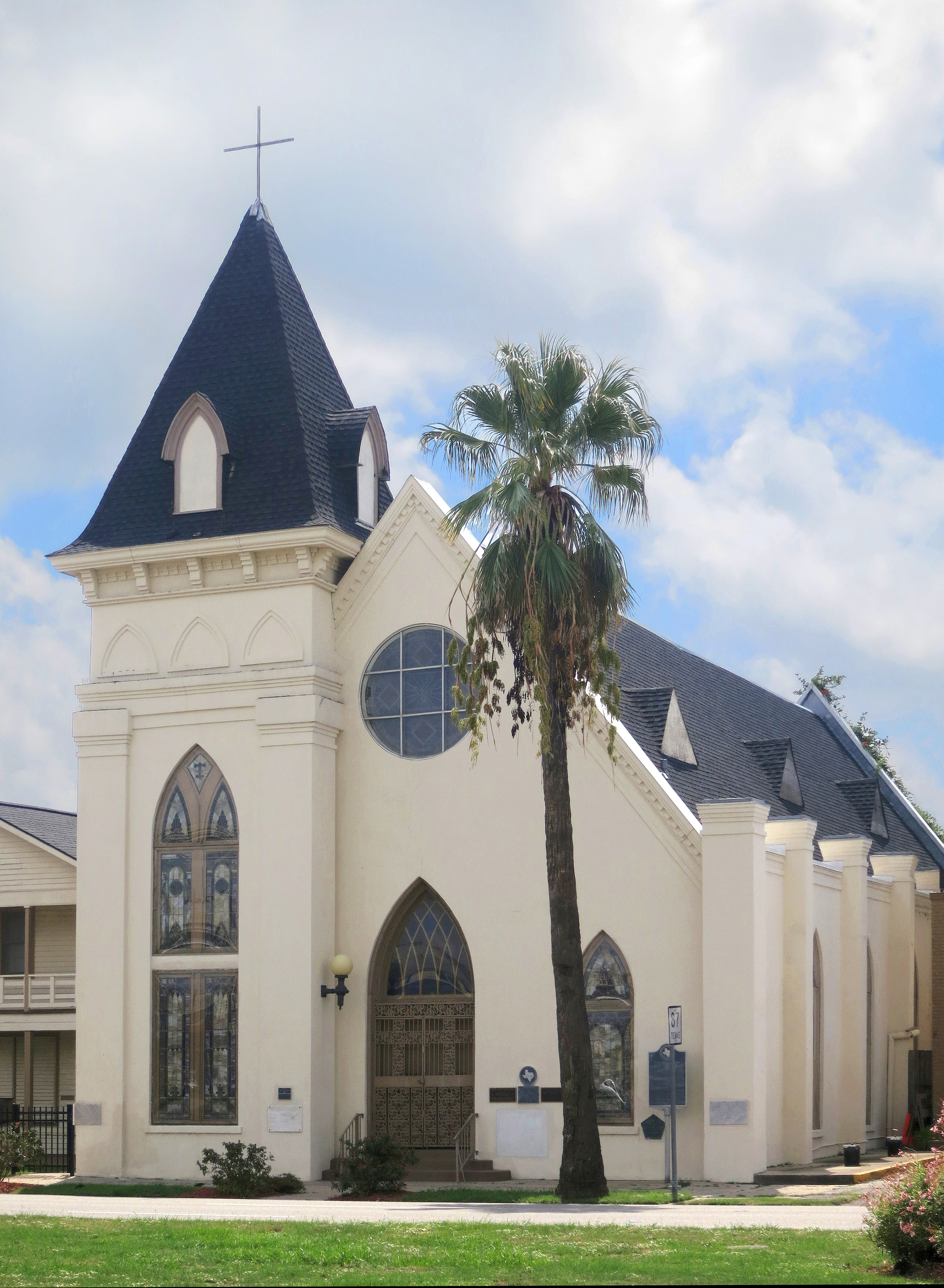
- Reedy Chapel A.M.E. Church in 2013

- Location within Texas Location within the United States
- Location: 2013 Broadway St., Galveston, Texas
- Area: less than one acre
- Built: 1886
- Architectural style: Late Gothic Revival
- NRHP reference No.: 84001717
- RTHL No.: 7548

Significant dates
- Added to NRHP: July 28, 1980 (updated August 4, 1984)
- Designated RTHL: 1975

Reedy Chapel A.M.E. Church is a historic African Methodist Episcopal (A.M.E.) church located at 2013 Broadway in Galveston, Texas. The church's congregation was founded in 1848 by enslaved African Americans and, following emancipation in 1865, the church was organized as Texas's first A.M.E. congregation in 1866. Reedy Chapel A.M.E. Church was one of locations of the public reading of General Order No. 3 by Union general Gordon Granger on June 19, 1865, which officially declared emancipation in Texas. The annual celebration of this declaration among African Americans continues today as the Juneteenth holiday.

The church's first permanent building was constructed in 1863, but it was destroyed in the 1885 Galveston Fire. The current church building was constructed in 1886 and was named for the congregation's second pastor, Reverend Houston Reedy, who hosted the church's first annual conferences starting in 1867. The church was listed as a Recorded Texas Historic Landmark in 1975 and listed on the National Register of Historic Places in 1980 (updated in 1984). The church is listed for both its significance to Black history as well as its significance as a notable example of 19th century Gothic Revival architecture. The building is a survivor of the 1900 Galveston hurricane.

== See also ==
- National Register of Historic Places listings in Galveston County, Texas
- Recorded Texas Historic Landmarks in Galveston County

== Bibliography ==
- Beasley, Ellen; Fox, Stephen (1996). Galveston Architectural Guidebook. Houston: Rice University Press. ISBN 0-89263-345-X.
