= E.S. Levy Building =

- U.S. National Register of Historic Places
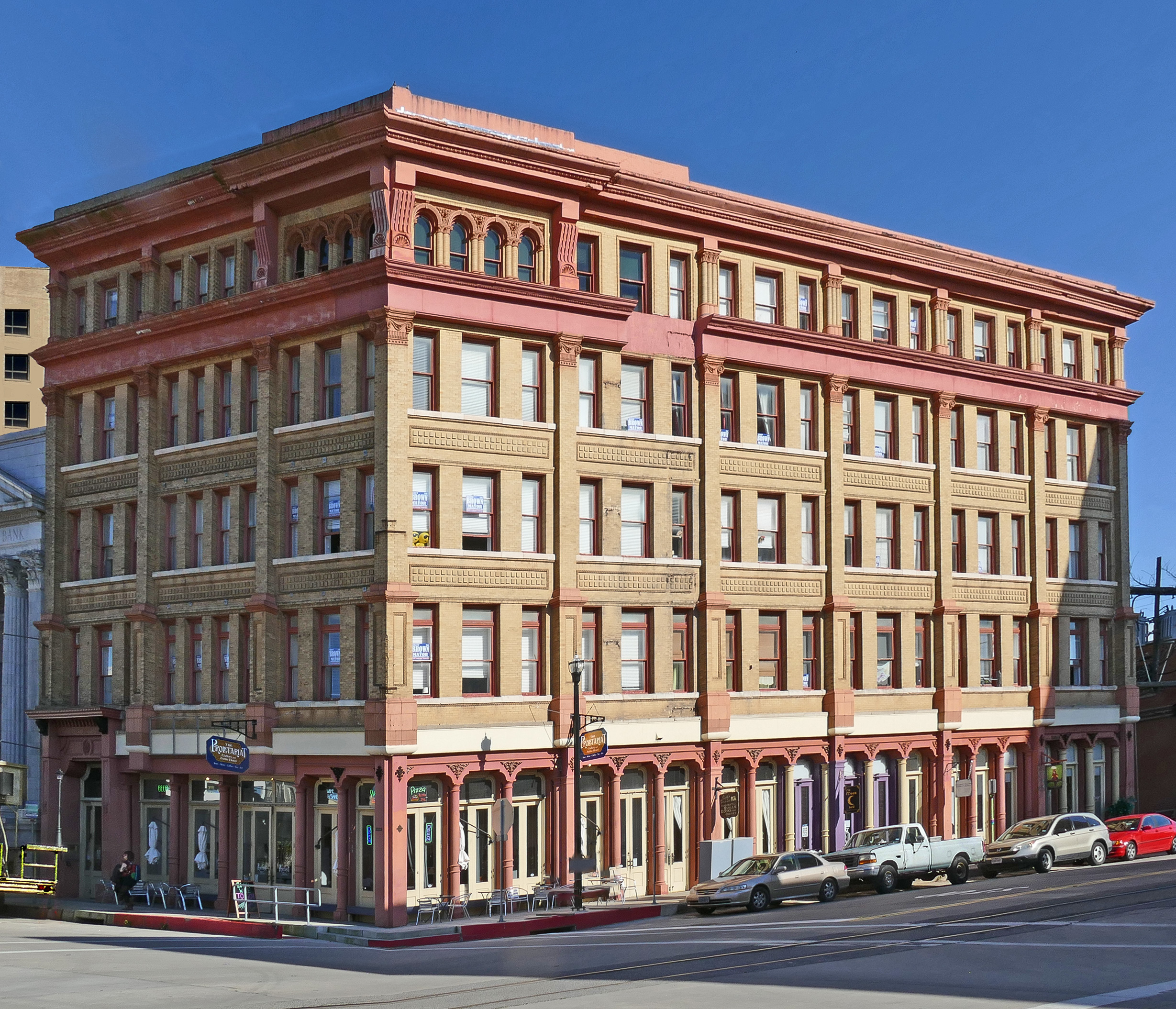

- Location within Texas Location within the United States
- Location: 2221-2225 Market St., Galveston, Texas
- Coordinates: 29°18′17″N 94°47′36″W
- Area: less than one acre
- Built: 1896
- Architect: Charles W. Bulger
- Architectural style: Early Commercial
- MPS: Galveston Central Business District MRA
- NRHP reference No.: 03001163
- Added to NRHP: November 13, 2003

The E.S. Levy Building, also known as the National Hotel Building, is a historic structure in Galveston, Texas.

== History ==
Originally the Tremont Opera house, some of the walls were retained when it was re-designed as the E.S. Levy department store in 1896.

The building was built for E.S. Levy & Co. and Ed S. Levy. It was added to the National Register of Historic Places on November 13, 2003. The building is located at 2221-2225 Market Street.

First working in Colorado, Charles Bulger moved his architecture practice to Galveston in the 1890s. The 1896 E.S. Levy Building was one of his first commissions in Galveston and marked a new direction for his choice of claddings from red to brown brick, which also marked a color change for buildings in downtown Galveston. Bulger added an additional floor to the building in 1908.

The E.S. Levy Building was redeveloped in 2001 with ground leases and studio spaces on the four upper floors. It was designated in 2020 for a Texas Preservation Trust Fund Grant Program (TPFT). The TPFT covered $30,000 of the re-development costs for preservation of the vintage windows and other repairs to address storm damage.

== See also ==
- National Register of Historic Places listings in Galveston County, Texas

== Bibliography ==
- Beasley, Ellen; Fox, Stephen (1996). Galveston Architectural Guidebook. Houston: Rice University Press. ISBN 0-89263-345-X.
- Ornish, Natalie (2011). Pioneer Jewish Texans (First Texas A&M University Press ed.). College Station, TX: Texas A&M University Press. ISBN 978-1-60344-423-1.
