= Eiband's =

United States historic building

- U.S. National Register of Historic Places
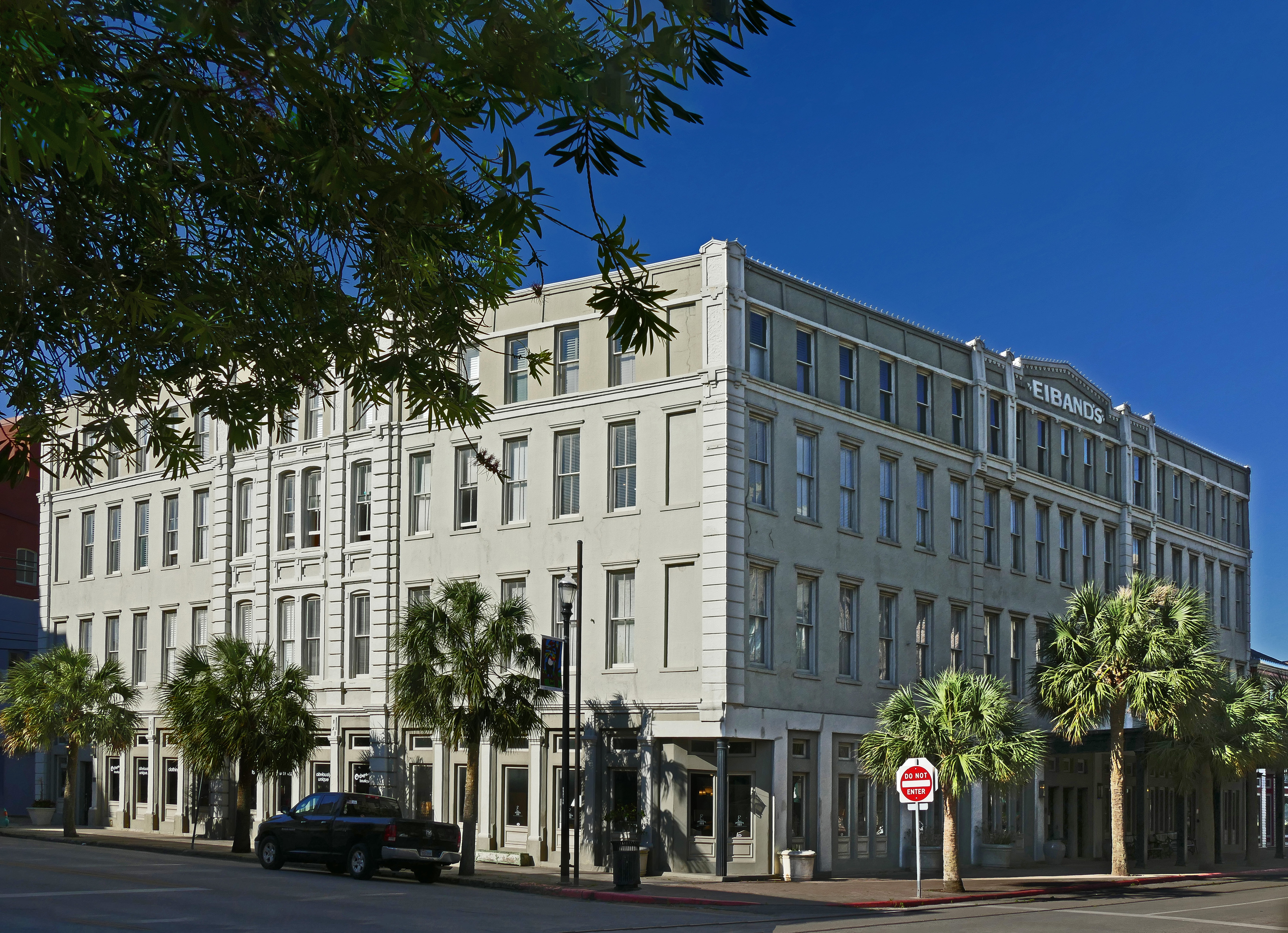
- Eiband's

- Location within Texas Location within the United States
- Location: 2201 Post Office Street; Galveston, Texas
- Coordinates: 29°18′16″N 94°47′32″W
- Built: 1914
- Architect: Green & Finger
- Architectural style: Classical Revival
- MPS: Central Business District MRACentral Business District MRA
- NRHP reference No.: 84001683
- Added to NRHP: June 27, 1984

Eiband's is a National Register of Historic Places-listed property at 2201 Post Office Street in Galveston, Texas.

== History ==
Eiband's was built for a clothing store of the same name in 1914 by Green & Finger. It is located at 2201 Post Office Street in Galveston, Texas and is listed on the National Register of Historic Places. Eiband's incorporated older buildings into a complex in 1914. Louis Sterling Green used existing the Ballinger & Jack Building (1870) as the centerpiece of the Post Office Street facade, which was previously used as a professional building and the home for the Texas Supreme Court. Green designed a much larger building absorbing the three-story Ballinger & Jack building. James B. Earthman and his wife refurbished Eiland's in 1995.

== See also ==
- National Register of Historic Places listings in Galveston County, Texas

== Bibliography ==
- Beasley, Ellen; Fox, Stephen (1996). Galveston Architecture Guidebook. Houston: Rice University Press. ISBN 0-89263-346-8.
