= The 1867 Settlement Historic District =

Coordinates: 29.382617°N 94.977500°W

- The Settlement Historic District
- U.S. National Register of Historic Places
- U.S. Historic district
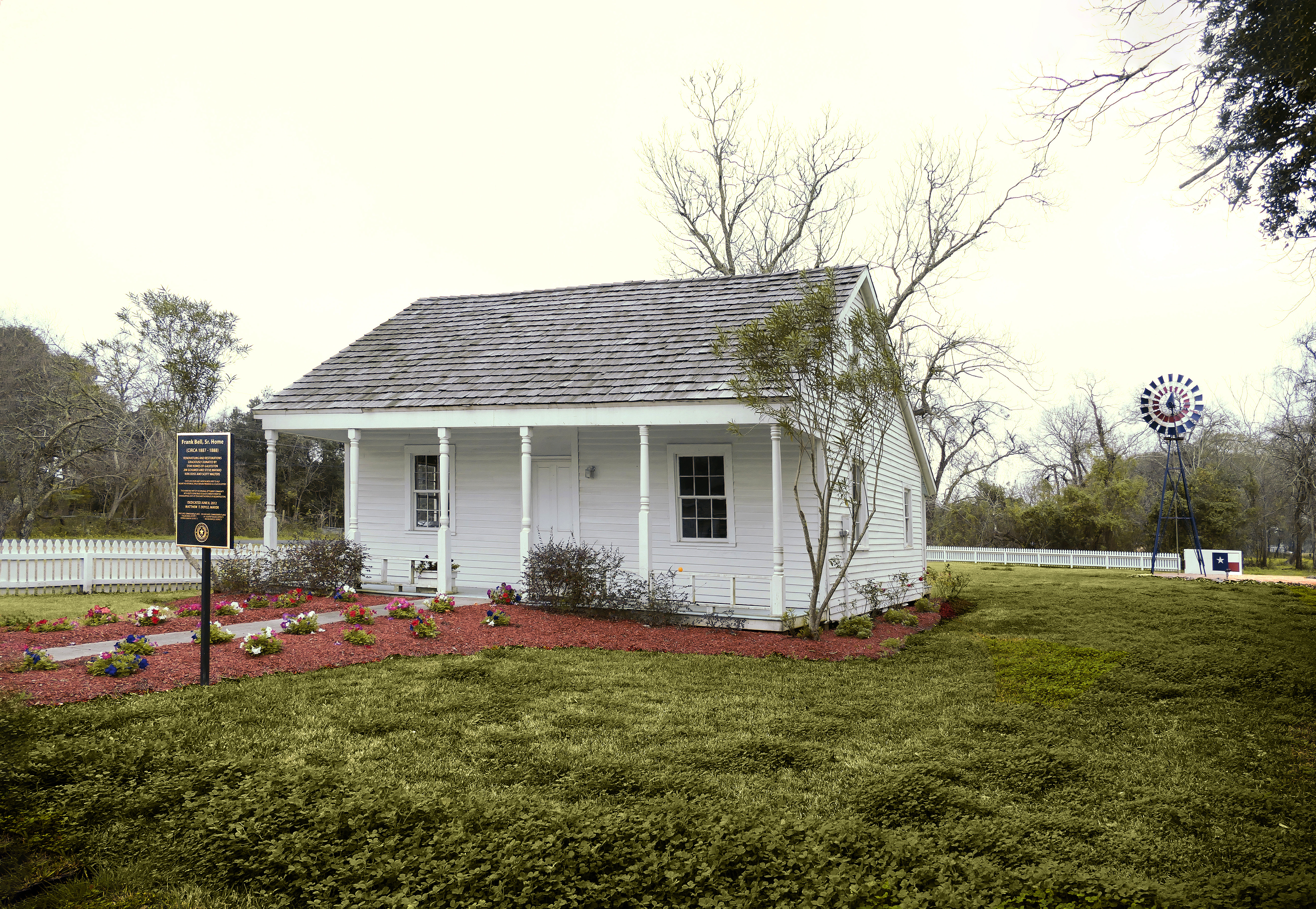

- Location within Texas Location within the United States
- Location: Texas City, Texas
- NRHP reference No.: 10000268
- Added to NRHP: May 17, 2010

The 1867 Settlement Historic District is a historic district located in Texas City, Texas, in Galveston County, Texas. It was listed on the National Register of Historic Places in 2010.

== History ==
The district was established in 1867 by formerly enslaved African Americans who purchased land from William Jefferson Jones of Virginia Point. Founding families included Kneeland and Sylvia Britton, Albert and Priscilla Phillips, Calvin Bell, Thomas Britton, and David Hobgood.

A church was organized in 1870 by Rev. Israel S. Campbell, and a sanctuary and school were built in 1871. Residents worked in ranching, agriculture, and later in railroad and industrial jobs. An interurban rail line and Highland Station were added in 1911. The area was known as Highlands and later La Marque before annexation into Texas City in the 1950s.

== Bell House ==
The Bell House, built in 1887 by Frank Sr. and Flavilla Bell, is the oldest surviving structure in the district. It is now a museum operated by the City of Texas City.
