= Trueheart-Adriance Building =

Historic building in Galveston, Texas, U.S.

- U.S. National Register of Historic Places
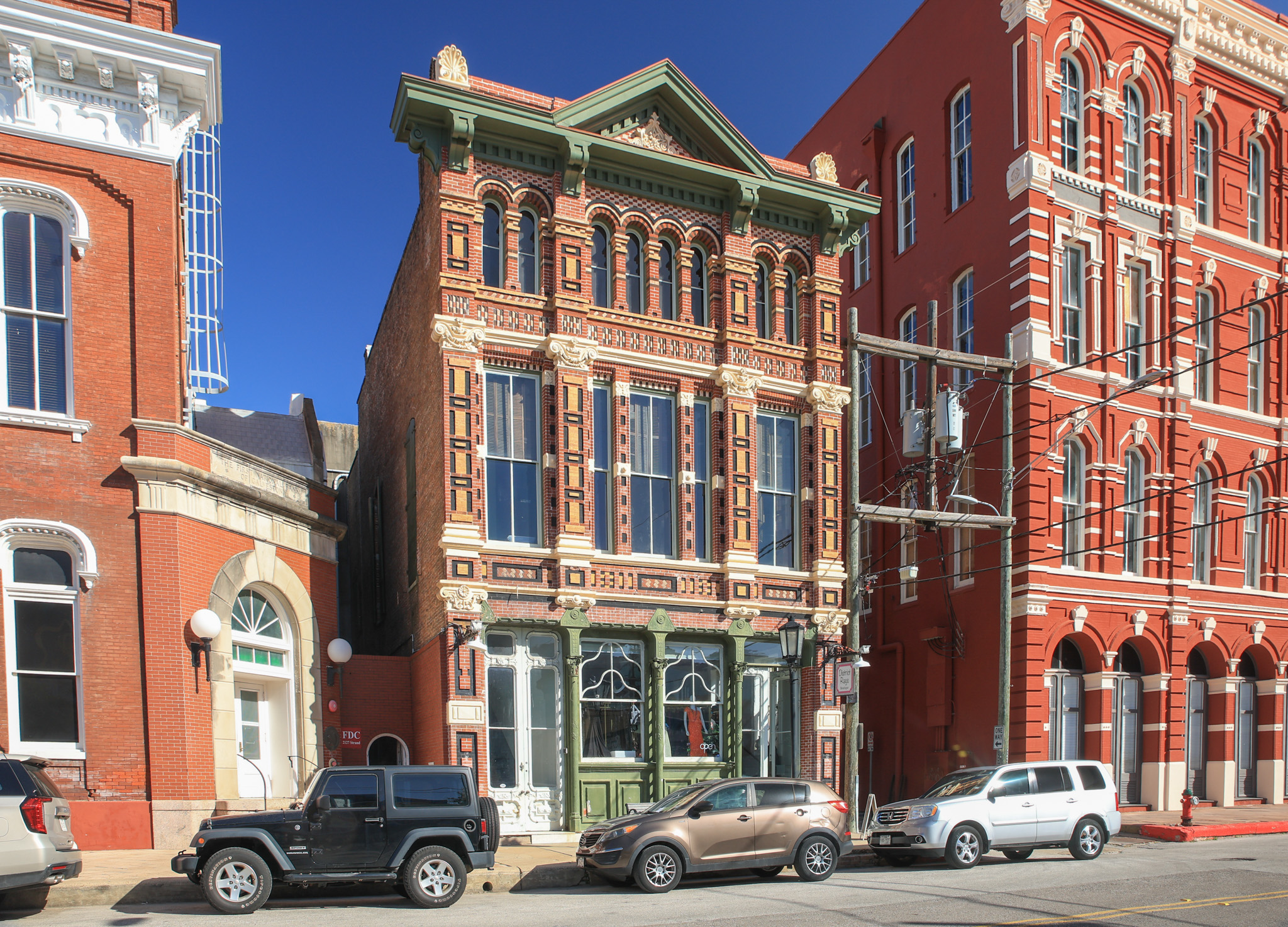
- Trueheart-Adriance Building

- Location within Texas Location within the United States
- Location: 212 22nd Street, Galveston, Texas
- Coordinates: 29°18′24″N 94°47′33″W
- Area: Less than 1 acre
- Built: 1882
- Architect: Nicholas J. Clayton
- Architectural style: Victorian
- NRHP reference No.: 71000933
- Added to NRHP: July 14, 1971

The Trueheart-Adriance Building is a NRHP-listed property in Galveston, TX. Nicholas J. Clayton completed the building in 1882.

== History ==
The building is named for H. M. Trueheart and John Adriance, who were partners in the oldest real estate firm in Texas. Trueheart acquired the firm from A. F. James in the late 1850s and took on Adriance as a junior partner in 1872. Adriance continued running the firm after Trueheart's death styled as John Adriance & Sons.

In 1966, the National Park Service sponsored a survey of the Strand district in Galveston. The Junior League of Galveston acquired the building in 1969 and restored it two years later, including refreshing the polychrome paint scheme. The result of this survey was a nomination of the Strand Historic District to be listed in the National Historic Register of Historic Places. After the initial submission of the nomination in 1970, an 1971 addendum included the Trueheart-Adriance Building as a contributing property. According to the nomination, the Trueheart-Adriance Building is a three-story High Victorian structure. The 26-foot facade is organized into three bays, with a dominant center bay.

== Bibliography ==
- Barnstone, Howard (1993). The Galveston that Was. College Station: Texas A&M University Press. ISBN 978-0890968871.
- Beasley, Ellen; Fox, Stephen (1996). Galveston Architecture Guidebook. Houston: Rice University Press. ISBN 0-89263-346-8.
