= Model Laundry =

Historic building in Galveston, Texas, USA

- Model Laundry and Dye Works Building
- U.S. National Register of Historic Places
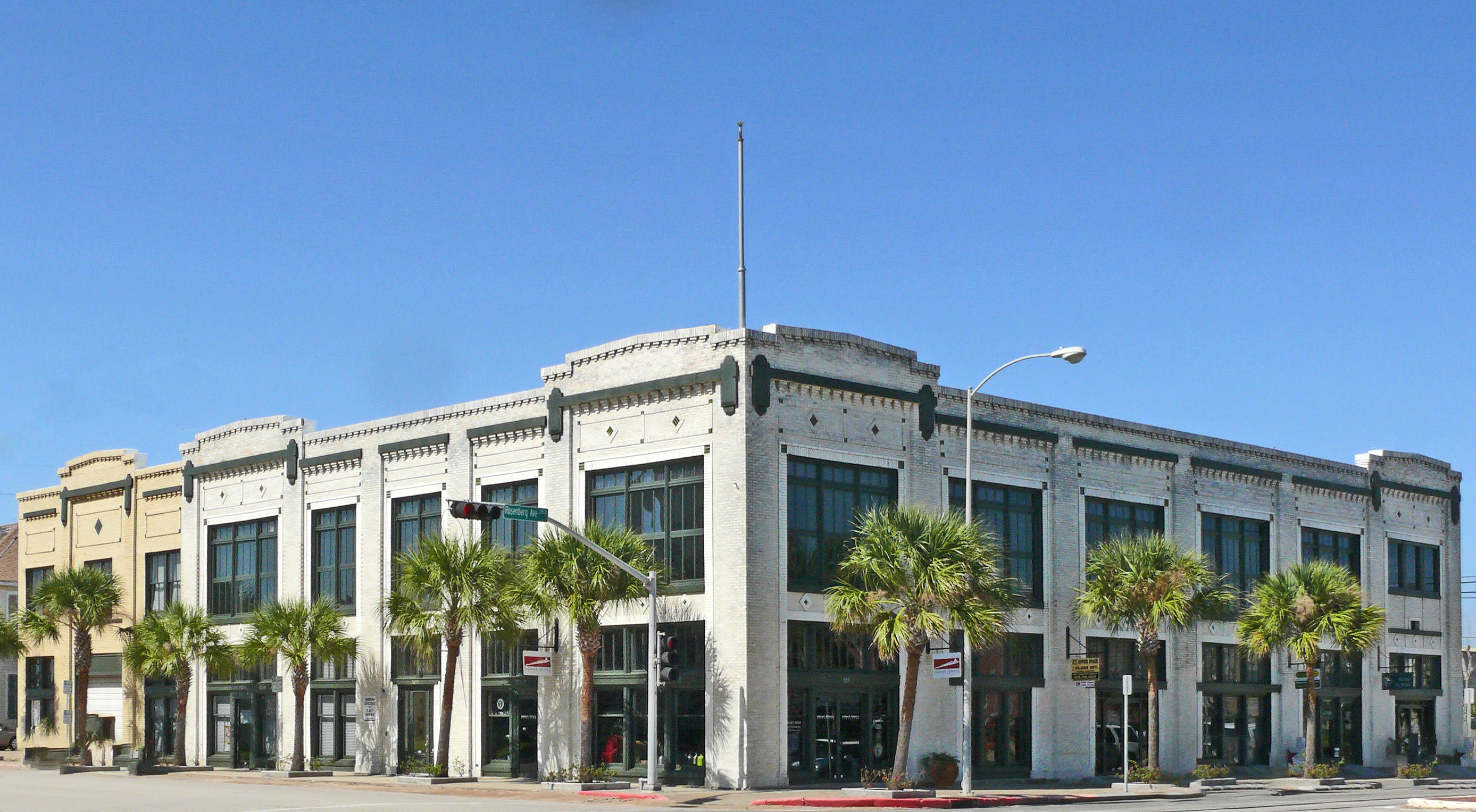
- Model Laundry and Dye Works Building

- Location within Texas Location within the United States
- Interactive map showing the location for []
- Location: 513−525 Rosenberg Avenue, Galveston, Texas
- Coordinates: 29°18′10″N 94°47′45″W
- Architect: Joseph Finger, Green and Finger
- NRHP reference No.: 84001717
- Added to NRHP: August 14, 1984

The Model Laundry & Dye Works Building is a National Register of Historic Places-listed building located at 513−525 Rosenberg Avenue in Galveston, Texas.

== History ==
When the Model Laundry & Dye Works opened on Rosenburg Avenue in 1913, it was the only steam laundry in Galveston. At that time, Rosenberg Avenue was already developing as a civic center corridor, while Joseph Finger framed the multiple bays of this two-story commercial building in white, glazed brick.

== Bibliography ==
- Beasley, Ellen; Fox, Stephen (1996). Galveston Architectural Guidebook. Houston: Rice University Press. ISBN 0-89263-345-X.
