= Jean Lafitte Hotel =

- U.S. National Register of Historic Places
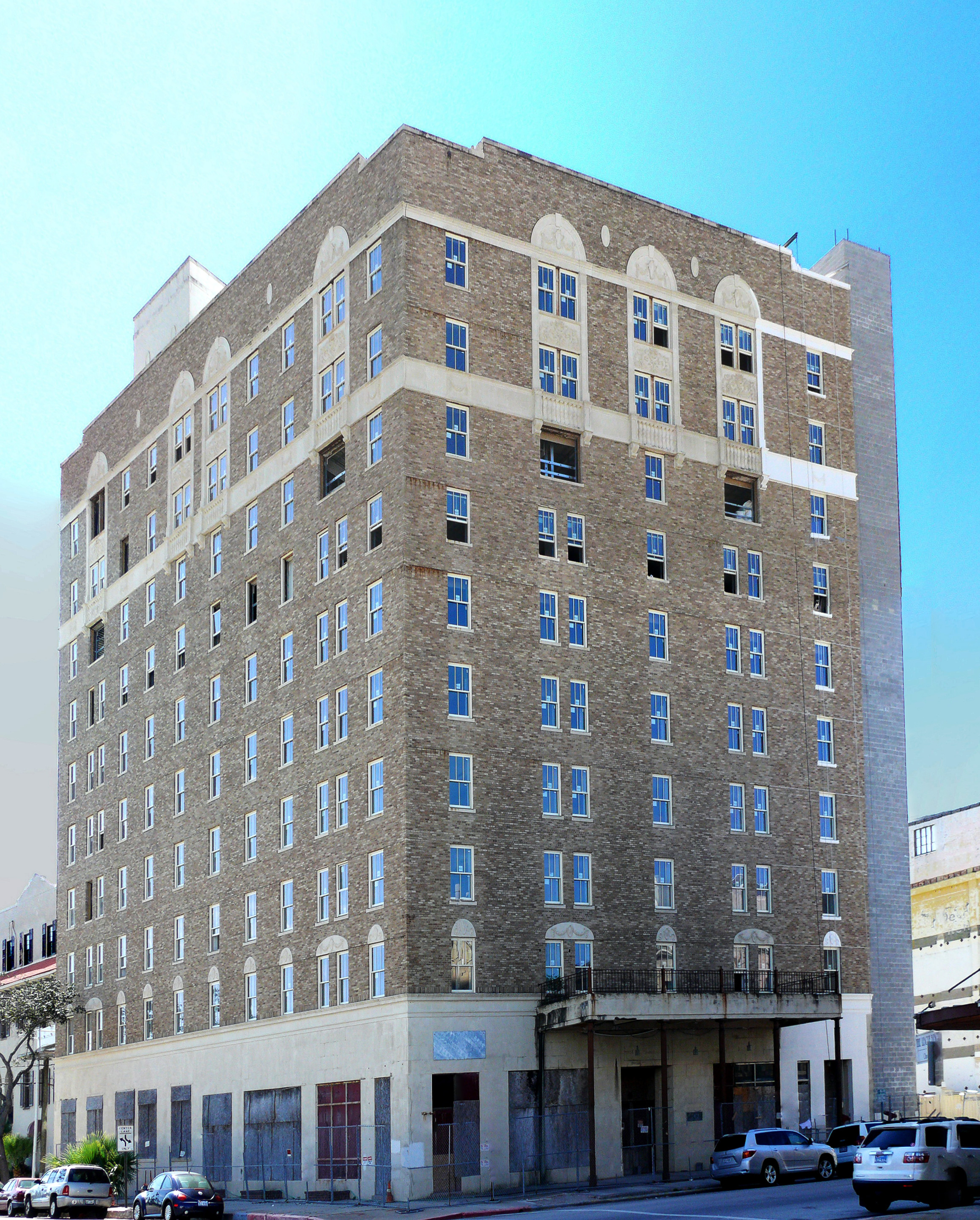
- Location: 2105 Church Street; Galveston, Texas
- Coordinates: 29.303889°N 94.790833°W
- Built: 1927
- Architect: Andrew Fraser
- NRHP reference No.: 84001705

The Jean Lafitte Hotel is a National Register of Historic Places-listed property located at 2105 Church Street in Galveston.

== History ==
The Jean Lafitte Hotel was marketed to business travelers, as were many hotels built in the 1920s in various settlements in Texas. This L-plan building was 10 stories in height, which was set on a base of stone and clad in brown brick.

== See also ==
- List of National Historic Landmarks in Texas
- National Register of Historic Places listings in Galveston County, Texas

== Bibliography ==
- Beasley, Ellen; Fox, Stephen (1996). Galveston Architectural Guidebook. Houston: Rice University Press. ISBN 0-89263-345-X.
