= Cathedral of Saint Mary (Austin, Texas) =

Catholic cathedral in Texas, US

Saint Mary Cathedral
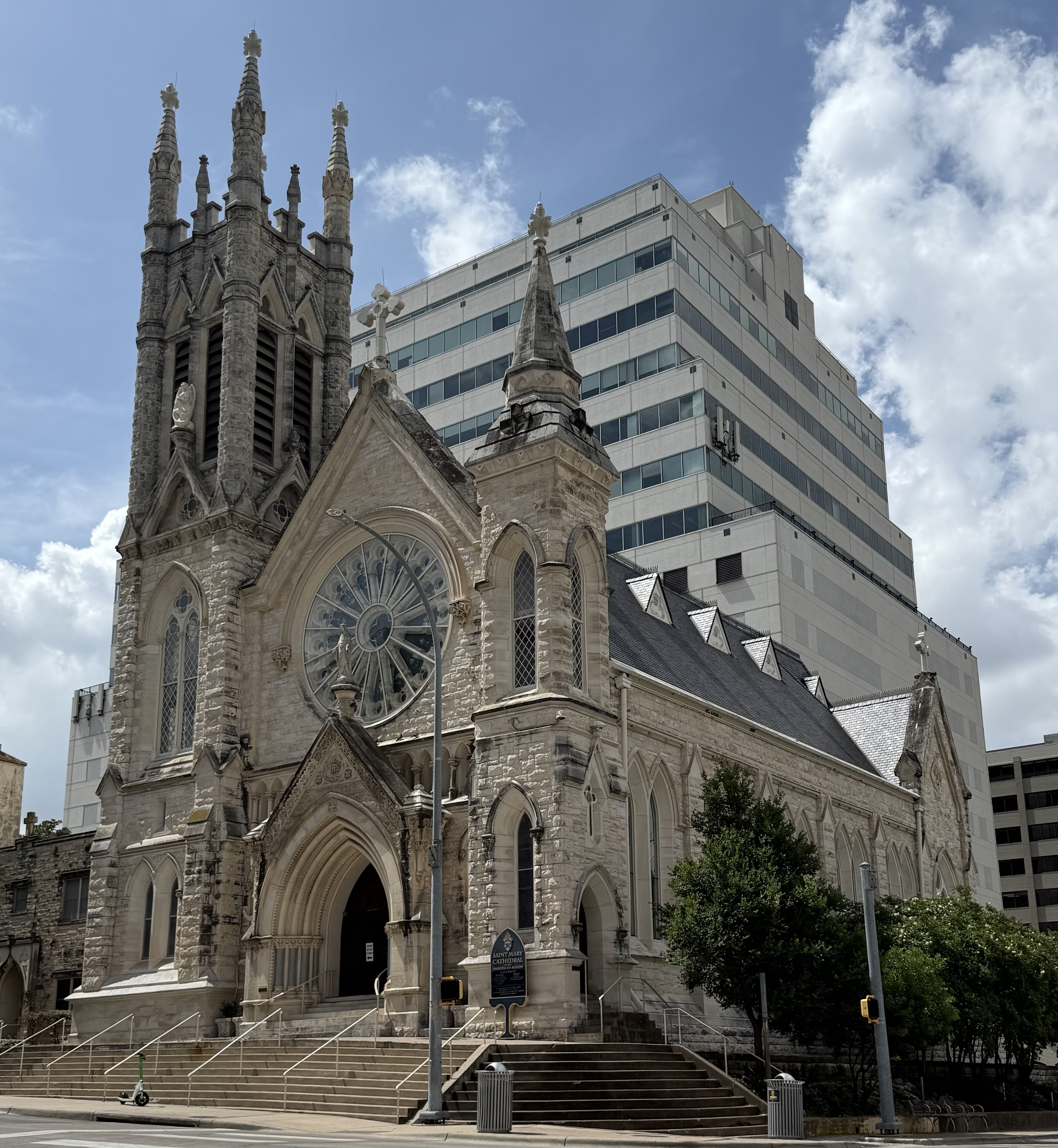
- Saint Mary’s Cathedral in 2025

- Location within Texas
- 30°16′16″N 97°44′24″W
- Location: 203 East 10th Street; Austin, Texas
- Country: United States
- Denomination: Catholic Church
- Sui iuris church: Latin Church
- Website: www.smcaustin.org

History
- Status: Cathedral
- Consecrated: 20 April 1884

Architecture
- Functional status: Active
- Architect: Nicholas J. Clayton
- Architectural type: Gothic Revival
- Style: Gothic Revival
- Groundbreaking: 1872
- Completed: 1884

Specifications
- Materials: Limestone

Administration
- Province: Galveston-Houston (Region X)
- Diocese: Austin

Clergy
- Bishop: Most Rev. Daniel E. Garcia
- Rector: Very Rev. Daniel Liu
- Vicar: Very Rev. Doug Jeffers
- St. Mary's Cathedral
- U.S. National Register of Historic Places
- Recorded Texas Historic Landmark
- NRHP reference No.: 73001981
- RTHL No.: 14676

Significant dates
- Added to NRHP: 2 April 1973
- Designated RTHL: 1977

Saint Mary Cathedral is the cathedral parish of the Catholic Diocese of Austin located in Austin, Texas, United States. It was listed on the National Register of Historic Places in 1973, as St. Mary's Cathedral.

== History ==
The origins of this church date to the 1850s when the largely Irish Catholic community in Austin, (originally called "Waterloo"), built a small stone church named St. Patrick's on the corner of 9th and Brazos Streets. It was built of locally quarried limestone. The parish continued to grow, due in no small part to the increase in German Catholics. In 1866, the parish decided they needed a new church and could afford masonry construction. While the Irish preferred that the church retain the name of St. Patrick, the German residents hoped the new church would be dedicated to a patron saint who reflected their heritage. Both sides compromised and agreed that the new church be named in honor of Mary. In 1872, after Austin was made the permanent capital of the state, the parish laid the cornerstone for a new church choosing a location one block north of the original building. At the time, Austin was part of the Diocese of Galveston. St. Mary's was finished in 1874 and dedicated in 1884. St. Patrick's was demolished around 1874.

When the Diocese of Austin was created in 1948, St. Mary's became the cathedral of the newly formed diocese.

In recognition of St. Mary's Irish roots, the Celtic Cultural Center of Texas holds an annual Christmas concert at the cathedral, highlighting traditional Irish and Scottish music played by noted artists. The show has sold out every year.

== Architecture ==
The new church was designed by Irish-born architect Nicholas J. Clayton in a Victorian design. It was his first independent commission. In 1872, he was in Galveston working as supervising architect for the construction of the First Presbyterian Church, designed by the Memphis, Tennessee, architects Jones and Baldwin. It may have been through the Holy Cross fathers that the bishop connected Nicholas Clayton with St. Mary's Austin. The neo-Gothic Revival towers and spires were completed in 1907. The original finials were removed in the 1950s, perhaps after being struck by lightning.

Additional stained-glass work was added in the 1890s. The cathedral's design evokes nature. The tree-like columns have their foliage-carved capitals; the murals contain tracery of vines and leaves. The pointed arches on doors and windows and the spires evoke the mountains. The ceiling and the blue dome spangled with stars reflect the sky and the heavens.

The cathedral's bell, donated by the family of Michael Butler, is one of the largest in the State of Texas.

In 1948, when the church was remodeled, many of its neo-Gothic decorations were removed, the neo-Gothic altars and altar rail were replaced with 20th-century marble and the baldachino with its cactus and bluebonnets, evocative of central Texas.

The cathedral underwent extensive restoration in 2013, due to some safety concerns. This included, among other work, cleaning the exterior, the replacing of some blocks and mortar, and the restoration of the large rose window in the front facade. The window's central design of the quincunx, in which four parts spin out of one, can be interpreted as a geometric representation of the four evangelists carrying the Word to the four corners of the world.

The building was listed in the National Register of Historic Places on April 2, 1973.

== Cathedral school ==
The Cathedral School of Saint Mary was established in 1866, and holds the distinction of being Austin's oldest school in continuous operation.

== Gallery ==
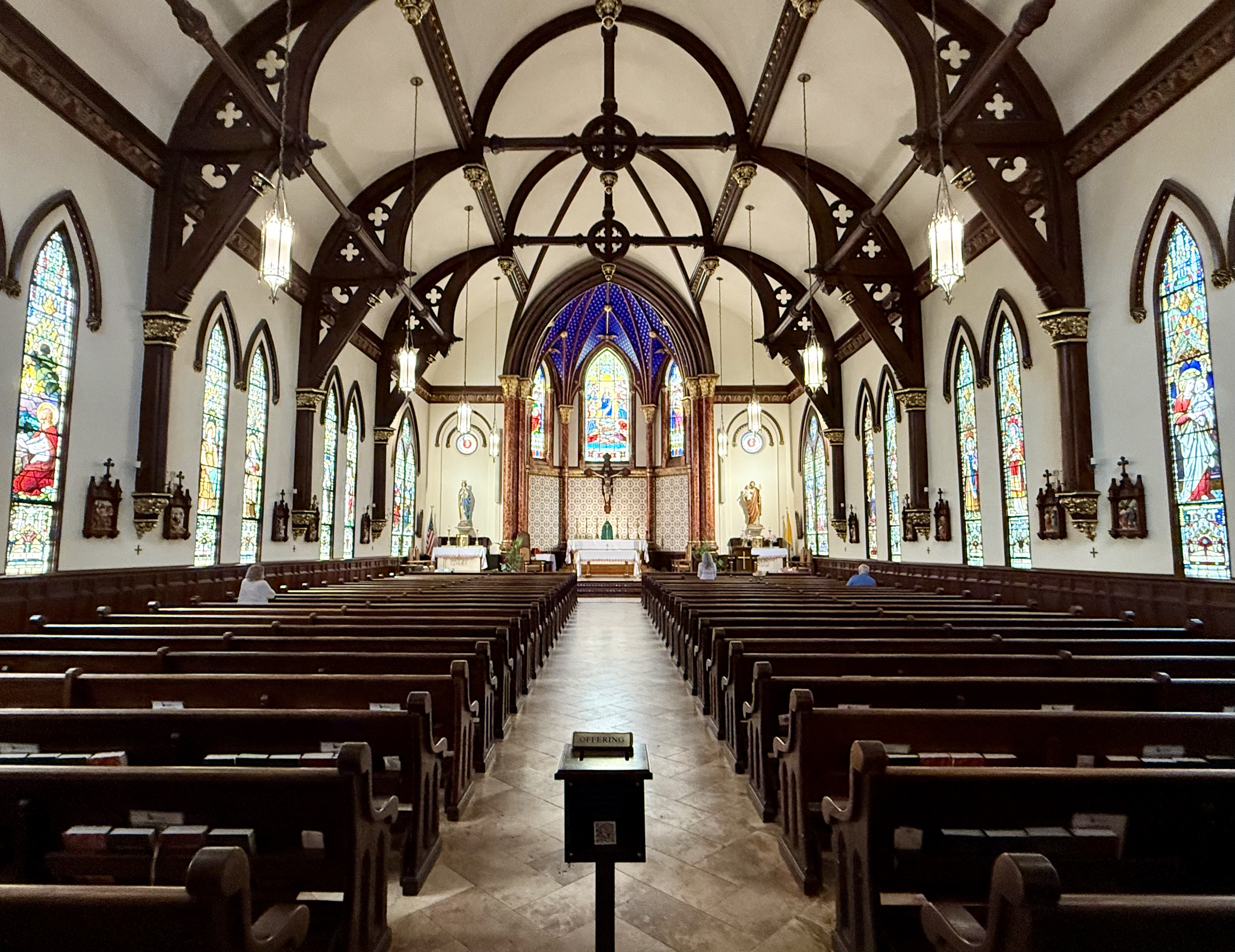
View up the nave toward the altar

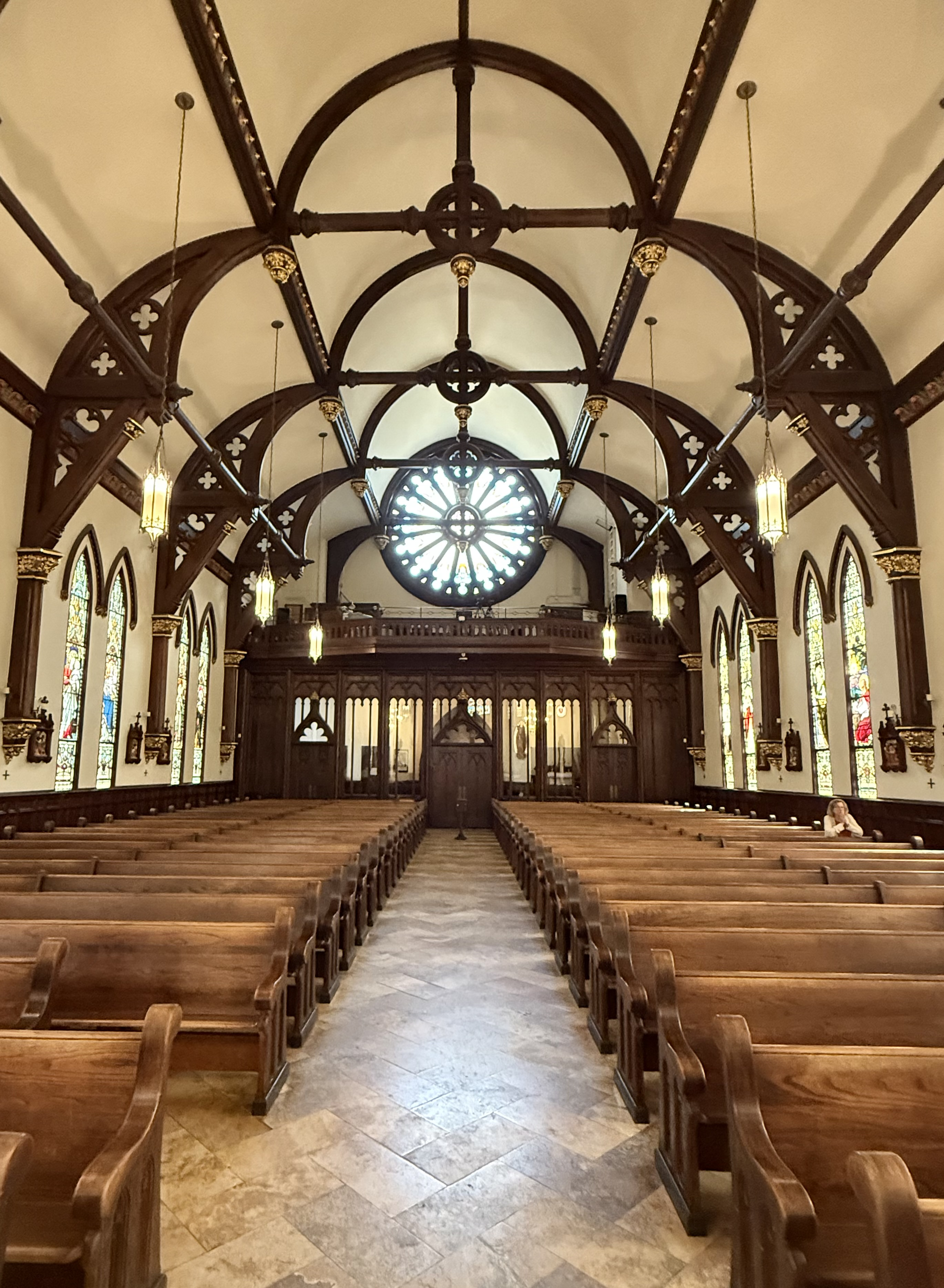
View down the nave toward gallery

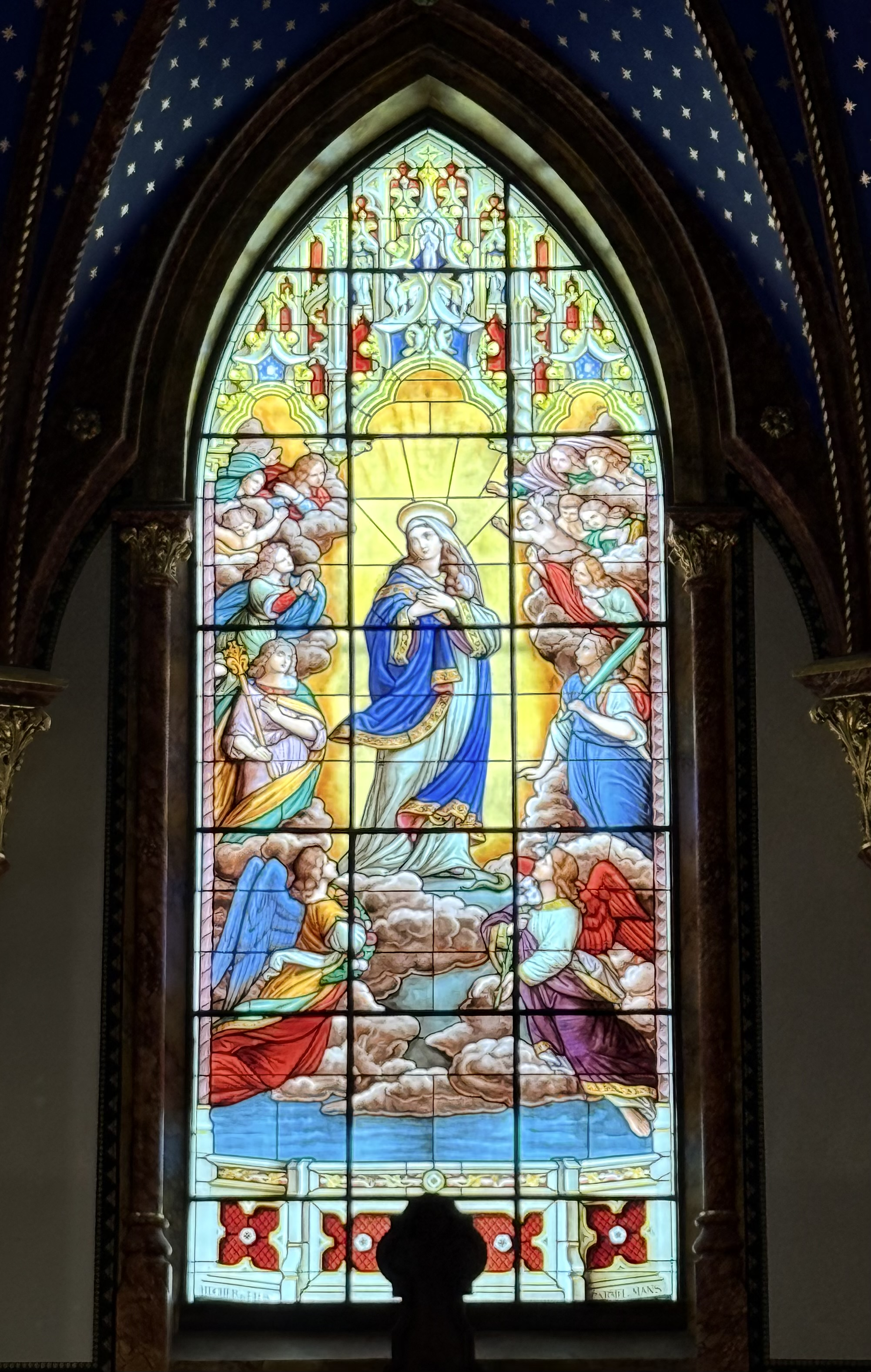
Stained glass window in the apse

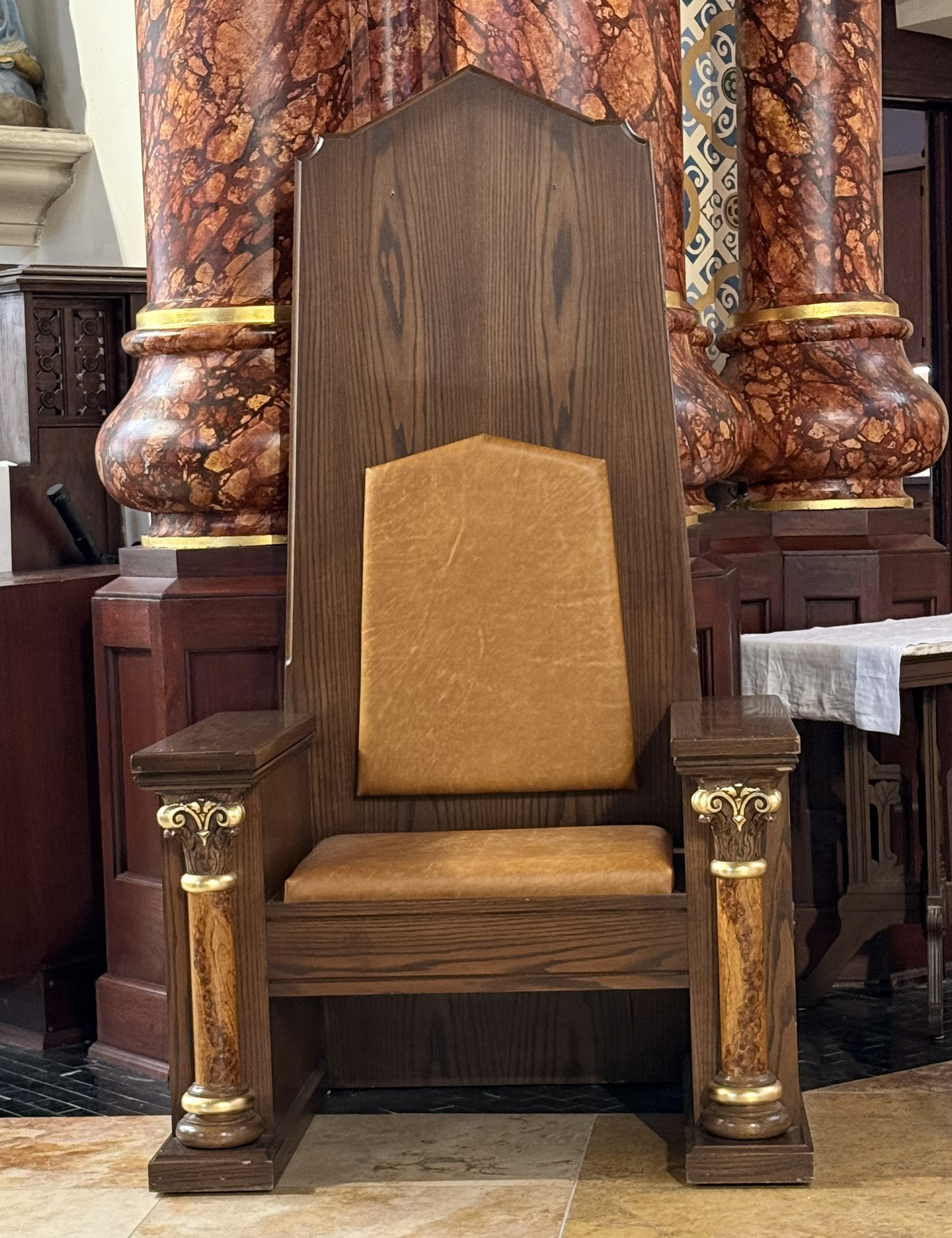
Cathedra

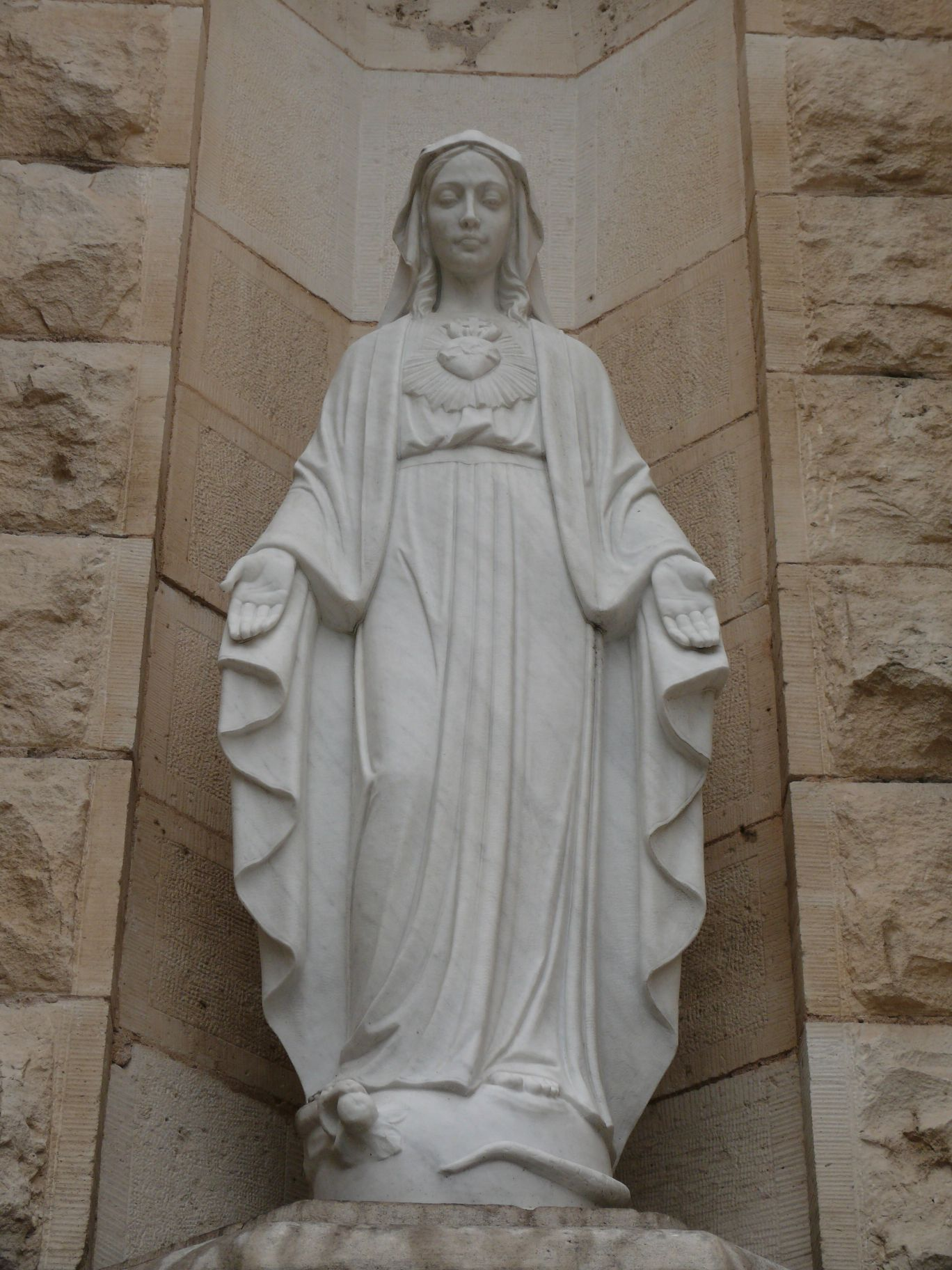
Statue of the Virgin Mary on the façade

== See also ==
- List of Catholic cathedrals in the United States
- List of cathedrals in the United States
- List of Recorded Texas Historic Landmarks in Travis County
- National Register of Historic Places listings in Travis County, Texas
