= Bishop's Palace (Galveston, Texas) =

Historic house in Texas, United States

- U.S. National Register of Historic Places
- U.S. National Historic Landmark District – Contributing property
- U.S. Historic district – Contributing property
- Recorded Texas Historic Landmark
- Bishop's Palace in 1967

- Location within Texas Location within the United States
- Interactive map showing the location of Bishop’s Palace
- Location: 1402 Broadway, Galveston, Texas
- Coordinates: 29°18′17″N 94°46′55″W
- Area: 0.4 acres (0.16 ha)
- Built: 1887-1892
- Architect: Nicholas J. Clayton
- Architectural style: Richardsonian Romanesque, Late Victorian, Eclectic
- Website: 1892 Bishop's Palace
- Part of: East End Historic District (ID75001979)
- NRHP reference No.: 70000746
- RTHL No.: 139

Significant dates
- Added to NRHP: August 25, 1970
- Designated NHLDCP: May 11, 1976
- Designated CP: May 30, 1975
- Designated RTHL: 1967

The Bishop's Palace, also known as Gresham's Castle, is an ornate 19,082 square feet (1,772.8 m^{2}) Victorian-style house, located on Broadway and 14th Street in the East End Historic District of Galveston, Texas. The building was designed by Nicholas J. Clayton for Walter Gresham and completed in 1892. The Archdiocese of Galveston purchased the property in 1923 and used it as its headquarters for four decades, after which they opened it up for tours. In 2013, the Galveston Historical Foundation (GHF) acquired the property. As of 2024, GHF continues to maintain the property and keep it open for public tours.

== History ==
=== Gresham's Castle ===
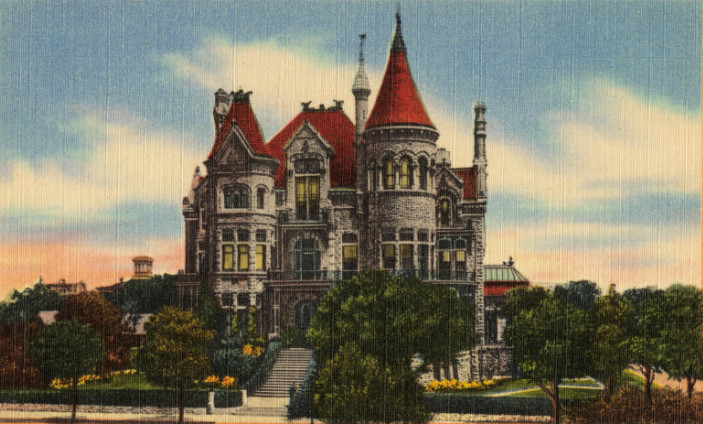
Postcard showing the Greshams' Residence around 1900

The house was built between 1887 and 1892 by Galveston architect Nicholas J. Clayton for lawyer and politician Walter Gresham, his wife Josephine, and their nine children.

Construction costs in 1892 are estimated at $250,000, while Clayton condensed many elaborate and eclectic design features onto a small homestead. Since Galveston experienced little population growth in the twentieth century, the high Victorian design of Bishop's Palace and other Clayton works from the 1890s characterize the town's architectural landscape. Clayton alternated medieval and Renaissance details onto the four towers, each rising four stories. In addition to these four towers, several chimneys combine to create an illusion of a cluster of houses or a village. Clayton constructed other exterior features from a variety of Texas stones, including granite and sandstone, all custom-cut on site.

The Gresham mansion was made all of stone, and was sturdy enough to withstand the great hurricane of 1900. The Greshams welcomed hundreds of survivors of the hurricane into their home.

=== Bishop's Palace ===
In 1923 the Roman Catholic Diocese of Galveston purchased the house, and, situated across the street from the Sacred Heart Church, it served as the residence for Bishop Christopher E. Byrne. After the diocesan offices were moved to Houston, the diocese opened the mansion to the public in 1963, with proceeds from tours being used to help fund the UT medical school's Newman Center, which operated in the basement.

Bishop's Palace attained Recorded Texas Historic Landmark status in 1967. It was listed with the National Register of Historic Places in 1970 and was added to the Galveston East End Historic District in 1975.

=== Galveston Historical Foundation ===
The Galveston Historical Foundation acquired Bishop's Palace from the archdiocese in 2013 for $3 million. Most of the purchase price was funded by two large grants, one from the Moody Foundation for $1.5 million and the other from the Harris and Eliza Kempner Fund for $350,000.

The Foundation began a multi-million dollar renovation of Bishop's Palace in 2020, with the first phase including restoration of copper roof sections and a renovation of the conservatory. The next phase of restoration took place in 2025, with the building's failing 1920s tile roof replaced by an exact replica manufactured by Ludowici. In addition to new tiles Ludowici produced ornamental figurines to cap the rooftop, replacing originals lost since 1983.

== Layout ==
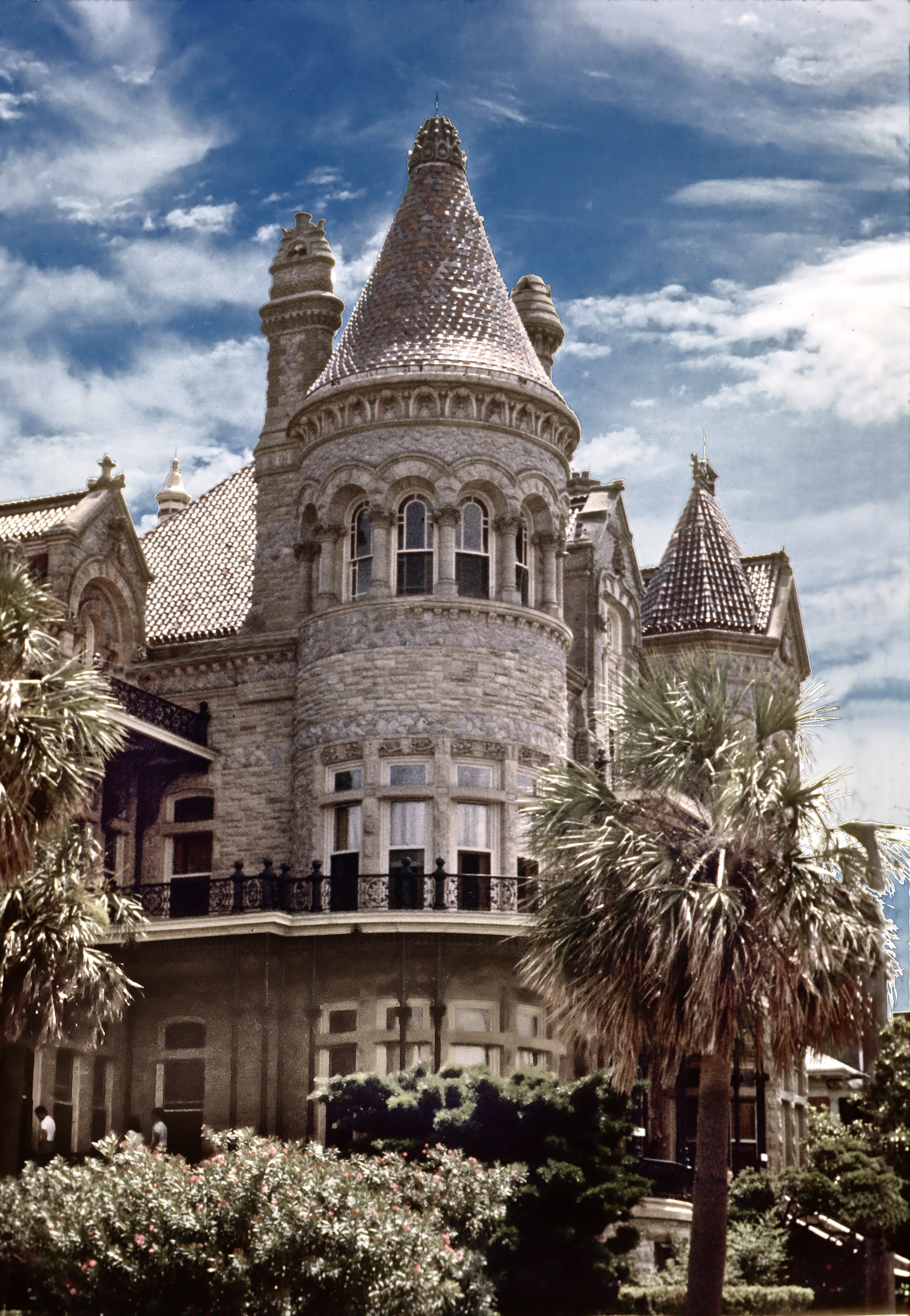
Circa 1970

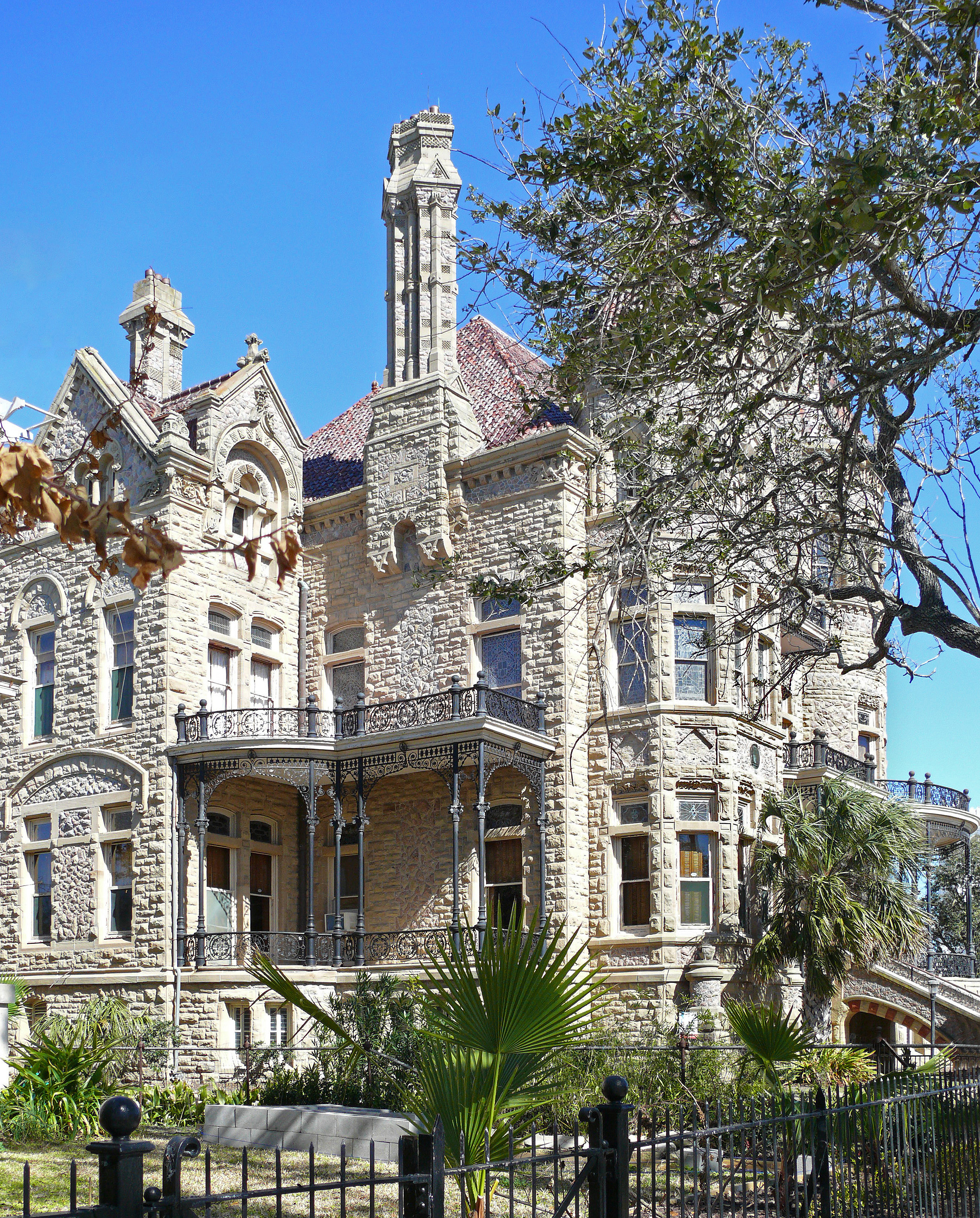
View from the West. An atypical view

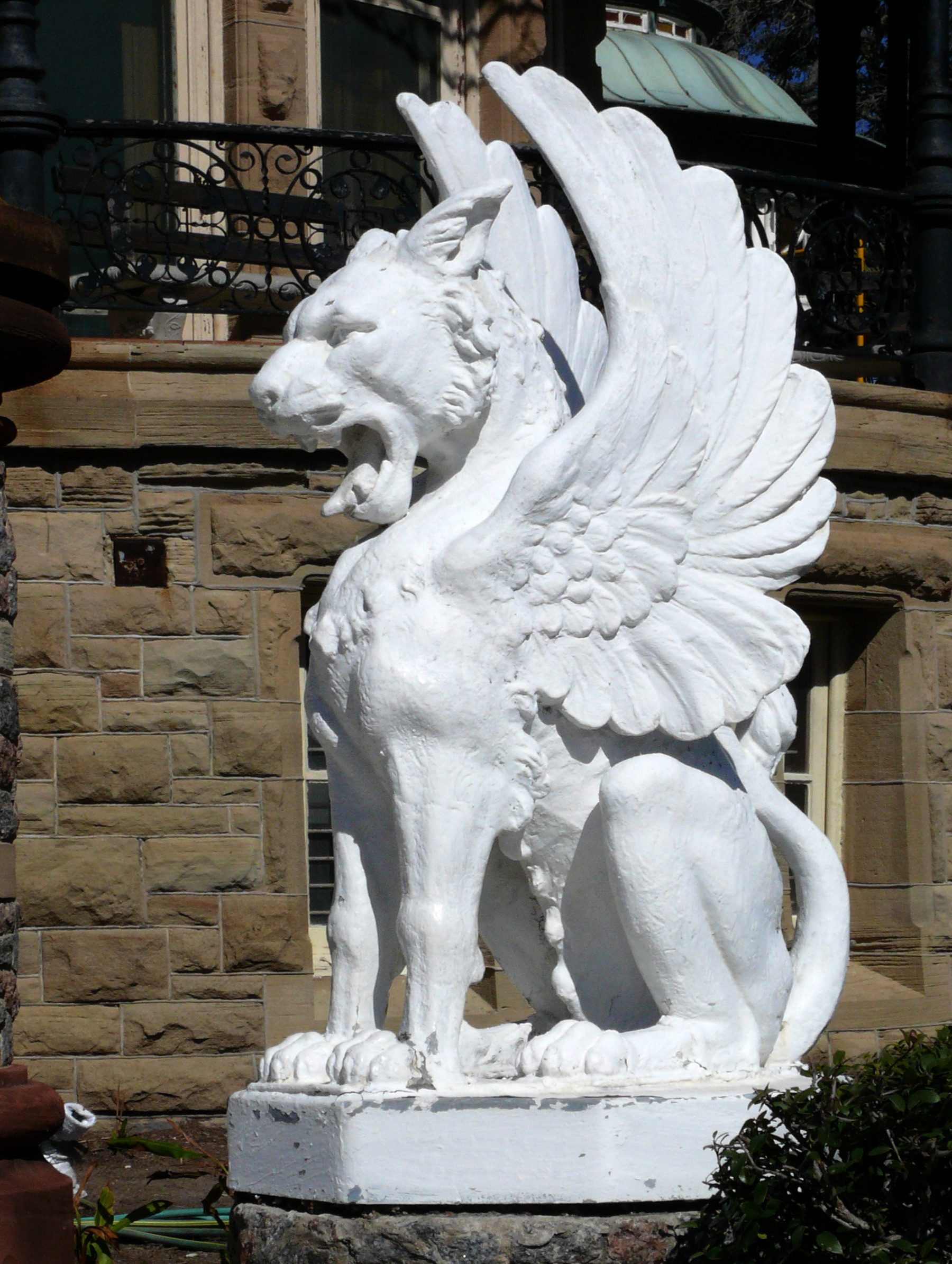
Lion of St Mark outside Bishop's Palace

Bishop's Palace has four floors. The raised basement which once housed the kitchen and servant's areas now contains the store. This basement is followed by three formal floors.

=== First floor ===
- Entryway - Leading to the entryway are stairs cut from blue granite, framed by granite balustrades, and leading to an archway. The large doors are made of oak.
- Main Hall - The entrance to the main hall is framed by marble pillars and two marble sculptures. Four polished marble pillars support the ceiling made of oak veneer. The main hall leads to four rooms. To the left, through carved double doors are two parlors. To the right, through another set of carved double doors, are the dining room and library.
- Parlor
- Music Room
- Rotunda Staircase
- Library/Office - The library is paneled in walnut and contains a marble fireplace and mantel.
- Dining Room - The Dining Room was surrounded by service rooms, with access from the kitchen, servant's hall, and butler's pantry.
- Conservatory
- Pantry
- Kitchen - This room was originally just a warming kitchen, but Bishop Byrne expanded the room.
- Servant's Hall - The servant's hall was located at the rear of the house, behind the kitchen. It has access to a service stairway, and an elevator, which replaced the dumbwaiter originally installed in the house.
- Coat Closet - The coat closet is tucked around the back side of the rotunda staircase and contains a Pullman sink from the famed Pullman railcars.

=== Second floor ===
- Living Room - The Gresham family often listened to music here during the hot summer months.
- Bishop's Bedroom - This was originally a bedroom of one of the Gresham daughters, but Bishop Byrne chose it for his own with its private balcony and lighting. He converted the closet into a bathroom.
- Chapel - This was also previously one of the Gresham daughter's bedrooms. When the Diocese moved in, the windows were replaced with stained-glass, and a fresco depicting the four gospel writers was painted on the ceiling. The room was also outfitted with an altar and six prayer kneelers.
- Mr. Gresham's Room
- Mrs. Gresham's Room
- Bathroom - The tub in this bathroom is of note for its three spigots: one for hot, one cold, and one for rainwater.
- Bedroom - This additional bedroom was for guests or the children's governess.

=== Third floor ===
- The boys' rooms
- Mrs. Gresham's art studio
- Additional storage

== See also ==
- List of National Historic Landmarks in Texas
- National Register of Historic Places listings in Galveston County, Texas
- Recorded Texas Historic Landmarks in Galveston County

== Bibliography ==
- Barnstone, Howard (1993). The Galveston that Was (Annotated reprint ed.). Houston: Rice University Press. ISBN 978-0890968871.
- Beasley, Ellen; Fox, Stephen (1996). Galveston Architectural Guidebook. Houston: Rice University Press. ISBN 0-89263-345-X.
- McComb, David G. (1986). Galveston: A History. Austin: University of Texas Press. ISBN 978-0-292-72053-4.
- Teague, Wells (2000). Calling Texas Home: A Lively Look at What It Means to Be a Texan. Berkeley, CA: Wildcat Canyon Press. ISBN 1-885171-38-2.
