= Nicholas J. Clayton =

Irish-American architect (1839 – 1916)

Nicholas Joseph Clayton FAIA
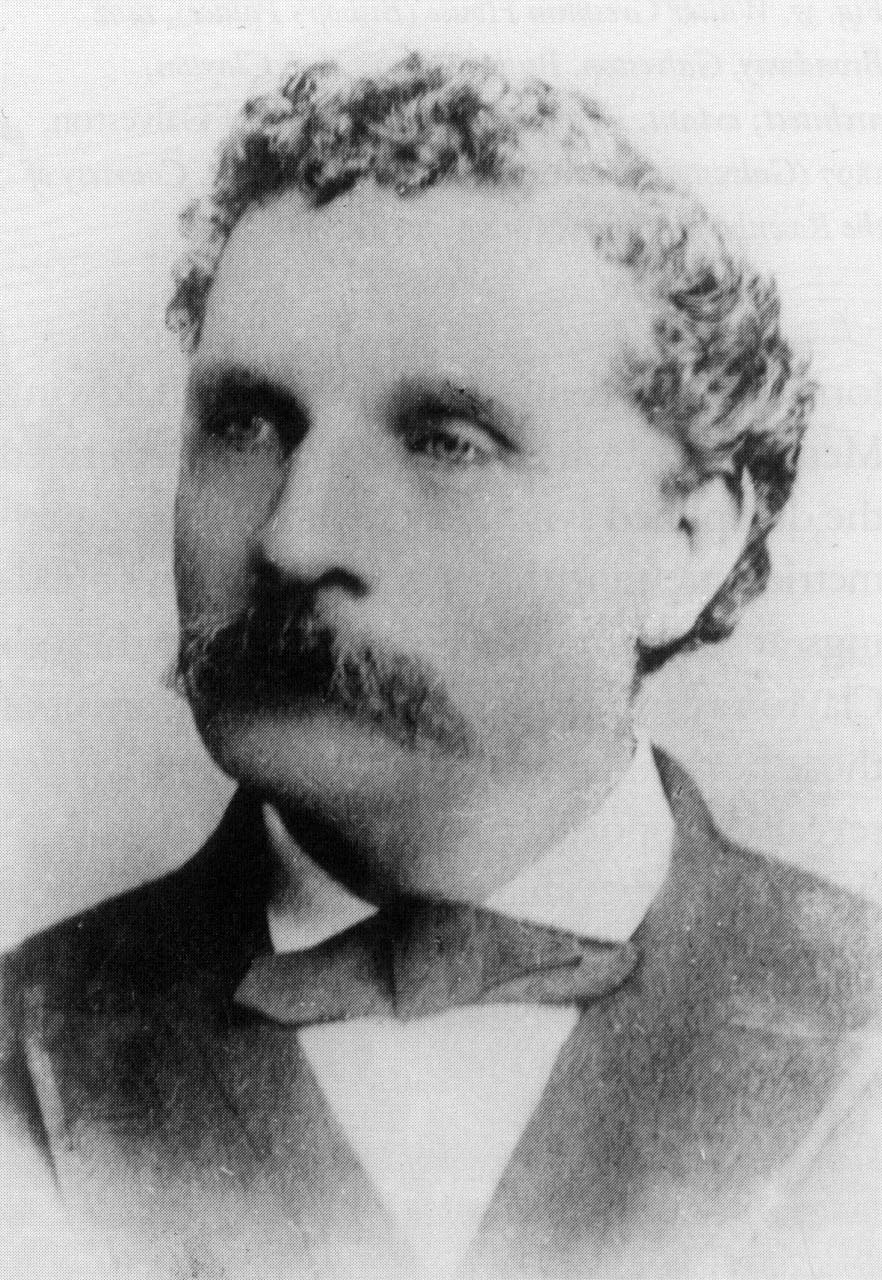
- Born: November 1, 1839; Cloyne, County Cork, United Kingdom of Great Britain and Ireland (present-day Republic of Ireland)
- Died: December 9, 1916 (aged 77); Galveston, Texas, U.S.
- Resting place: Calvary Catholic Cemetery, Galveston
- Occupation: Architect
- Years active: 1872-1916
- Spouse: Mary Lorena Ducie (m. 1891)
- Children: 5
- Practice: Jones & Baldwin; Clayton & Lynch; N.J. Clayton and Company
- Buildings: Bishop's Palace, Ashbel Smith Building, Main Building (St. Edward's University), St. Mary Cathedral, Holy Trinity Catholic Church, National Shrine Cathedral of Our Lady of Guadalupe, Stafford Opera House, Beach Hotel (destroyed), many buildings in Galveston's East End and Strand historic districts, and elsewhere
- Military career
- Allegiance: United States of America
- Branch: Navy
- Service years: 1862-1865
- Rank: Yeoman
- Conflict: American Civil War

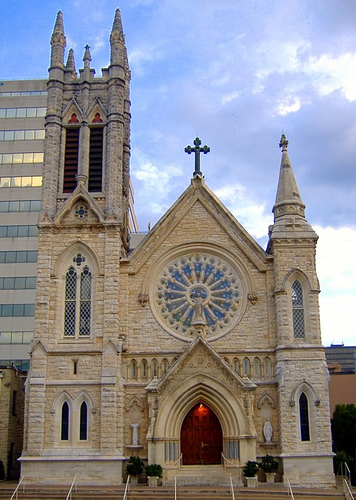
Saint Mary's Cathedral, Austin, TX

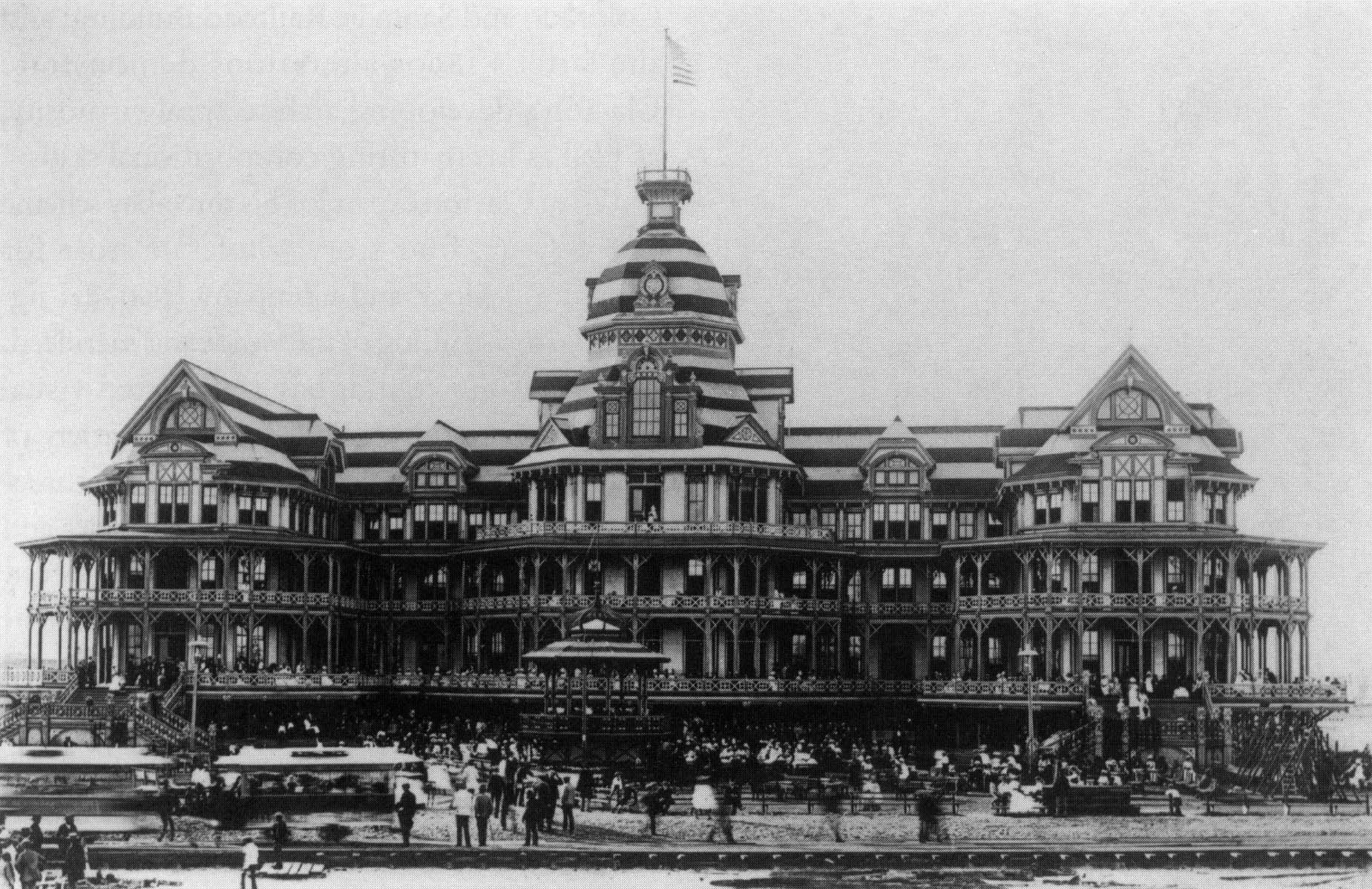
The Beach Hotel, Galveston

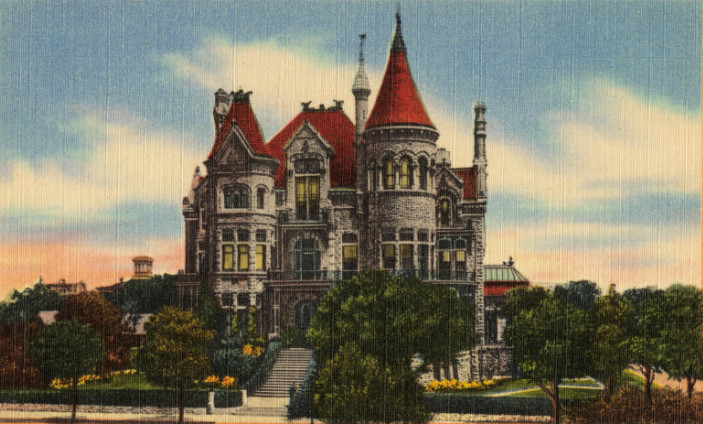
Bishop's Palace, postcard

Nicholas Joseph Clayton (November 1, 1840, in Cloyne, County Cork – December 9, 1916) was a prominent Victorian era architect in Galveston, Texas.

== Early life ==
Clayton was born on November 1, 1839, in Cloyne, County Cork, Ireland. His father, also named Nicholas Joseph Clayton, died in 1848. Margaret O'Mahoney Clayton, his mother, moved from Ireland to Cincinnati the same year. He served as a yeoman in the United States Navy during the Civil War. Following the war, he worked throughout the American South and Midwest as a craftsman and draftsman, finally settling in Galveston in 1872.

== Career ==
Clayton constructed many grand religious and public buildings in Galveston including the First Presbyterian Church (Galveston, Texas). He is also credited as the architect of Sacred Heart Catholic Church (Tampa, Florida) and of the Main Building of St. Edward's University in Austin, Texas. He also designed an addition to St. Mary Cathedral in Galveston. In 1887, Clayton was consulted in the design process of the fourth (and current) Texas State Capitol building in Austin, serving on an advisory board for the dome's construction and assisting with the selection of interior furnishings.

== Works ==
1873
- St. Mary's Church - Gothic Revival, Austin (1873)

1874

- Ball High School, Galveston (1884, demolished)
- St. Mary's Infirmary, 701 Market Street, Galveston (1874, demolished in 1965)
- Dallas Orphan Asylum

1875

- Seeligson House, 1208 Ball Avenue, Galveston (1875)
- Galveston County Courthouse (1875, demolished)

1876

- Burr House, 1228 Sealy Avenue, Galveston (1876)

1877

- Albert A. Van Alstyne house, 1216 Main Street, Houston (1877), demolished).
- Lovenberg House, 1412 Market Street, Galveston (1877)
- Bolton Estate Building, 2321–2323 Strand, Galveston (1877, Clayton & Lynch)
- Wallis, Landes and Company, 2411 Strand, Galveston (1877, Clayton & Lynch, only the storefront remains)
- St. Patrick's Church, 1013–1027 34th Street, Galveston (1877, Clayton & Lynch)

1878

- George Schneider and Company Building, 2101–2107 Strand Street, Galveston (1878, Clayton and Lynch)
- The John Stoddard Brown & Company Building, 2111 Strand Street, Galveston (1878, Clayton)

1879

- Eaton Memorial Chapel, Trinity Episcopal Church, 721 22nd Street, Galveston (1879, Clayton and Lynch)

1880

- Masonic Lodge Building, Galveston (c. 1880, demolished)

1882

- Ursuline Academy of Dallas (1882, central building only, demolished in 1949)
- Beach Hotel (Galveston), Tremont Street at the beach (1882, destroyed by fire in 1898)
- Electric Pavilion, Galveston (1882, burned 1883)
- Trueheart-Adriance Building, 212 22nd Street, Galveston (1882)
- Greenleve, Block & Co. Building, 2310–2314 Strand, (1882)

1883

- Harmony Hall, Galveston (1882–1883, burned, 1928)
- W. L. Moody Building (Strand Surplus Senter), 2202–2206 Strand, Galveston (1883)

1884

- Galveston News Building, 2108 Mechanic Street, Galveston (1884)
- Ball High School, Galveston (1884, demolished)
- Sacred Heart Church, Galveston (destroyed in 1900 hurricane)

1885

- Addition to Sydnor-Heidenheimer House, Galveston

1886

- Stafford Opera House, 425 Spring Street, Columbus, Texas (1886)

1887

- Sonnentheil House, 1826 Sealy Avenue, Galveston (1887)
- Temple B'nai Israel, 816 22nd Street, Galveston, (1887 and 1902 addition), later the Masonic Temple

1888

- Incarnate Word Academy (Houston), (1888–89 and 1899, demolished; 1905, extant)
- St. Matthews Catholic Church (Monroe, La.)
- St. Edward's University (Main Building and Holy Cross dormitory), Austin (1888)

1889

- Rudolph Kruger House, 1628 Postoffice Street, Galveston (1889)
- Morris Lasker House, Galveston

1890

- Sacred Heart Church, Palestine, Texas (1890–1893)
- Ursuline Convent (Dallas)
- John Sealy Hospital (demolished in 1962)
- Adoue & Lobit Bank, 2101 Strand, Galveston, aka Steele Building after 1919, aka Commerce Building after 1976

1891

- Ashbel Smith Building - Romanesque Revival (1891)

1892

- Bishop's Palace, Galveston, 1402 Broadway, Galveston, Victorian (1892)

1893

- League House, 1710 Broadway, Galveston (1893)
- Ursuline Academy, 2600 Avenue N Galveston (1891–1894, demolished in 1962)

1895

- St. Joseph's Infirmary, Houston (1892–94, 1895, demolished)
- Grace Episcopal Church, Galveston (1894)
- St. Francis Xavier Cathedral (Alexandria, Louisiana) - Gothic Revival (1895)
- Hutchings-Sealy Building (Galveston) (1895)

1896

- St. Patrick's Church, Denison (1896–1898)
- Sacred Heart Cathedral, Dallas - Gothic Revival (1896–1902)
- St. Patrick's Catholic Church, 1013–1027 34th Street, Galveston (reconstructed in 1902)

1905

- Sacred Heart Catholic Church (Tampa, Florida) - Romanesque Revival (1905)
- St. Matthew's Catholic Church, Monroe, Louisiana (1905)

1912

- the dome of the second Sacred Heart Church, Galveston (1912)

== Gallery ==
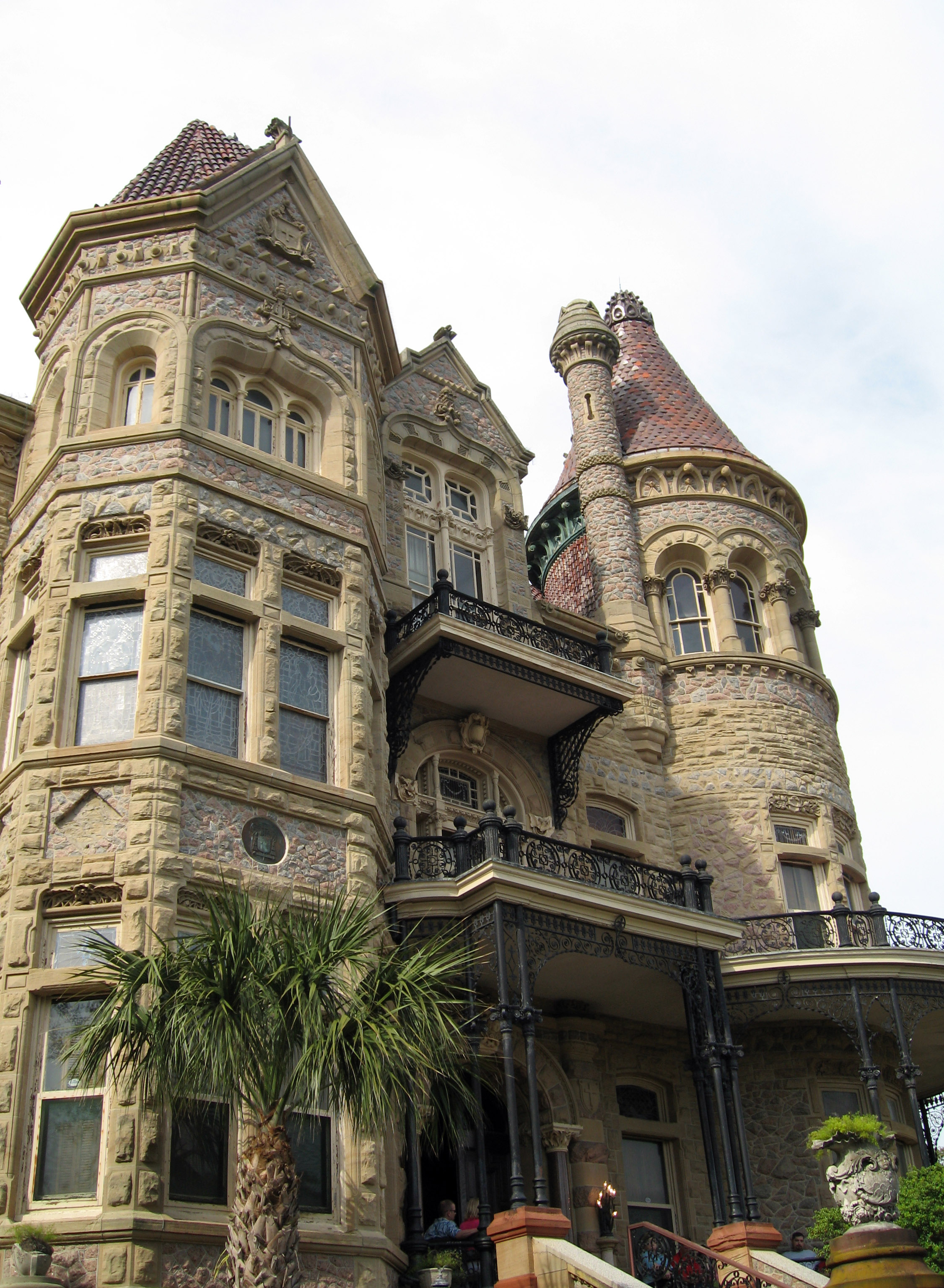
Bishop's Palace, Galveston

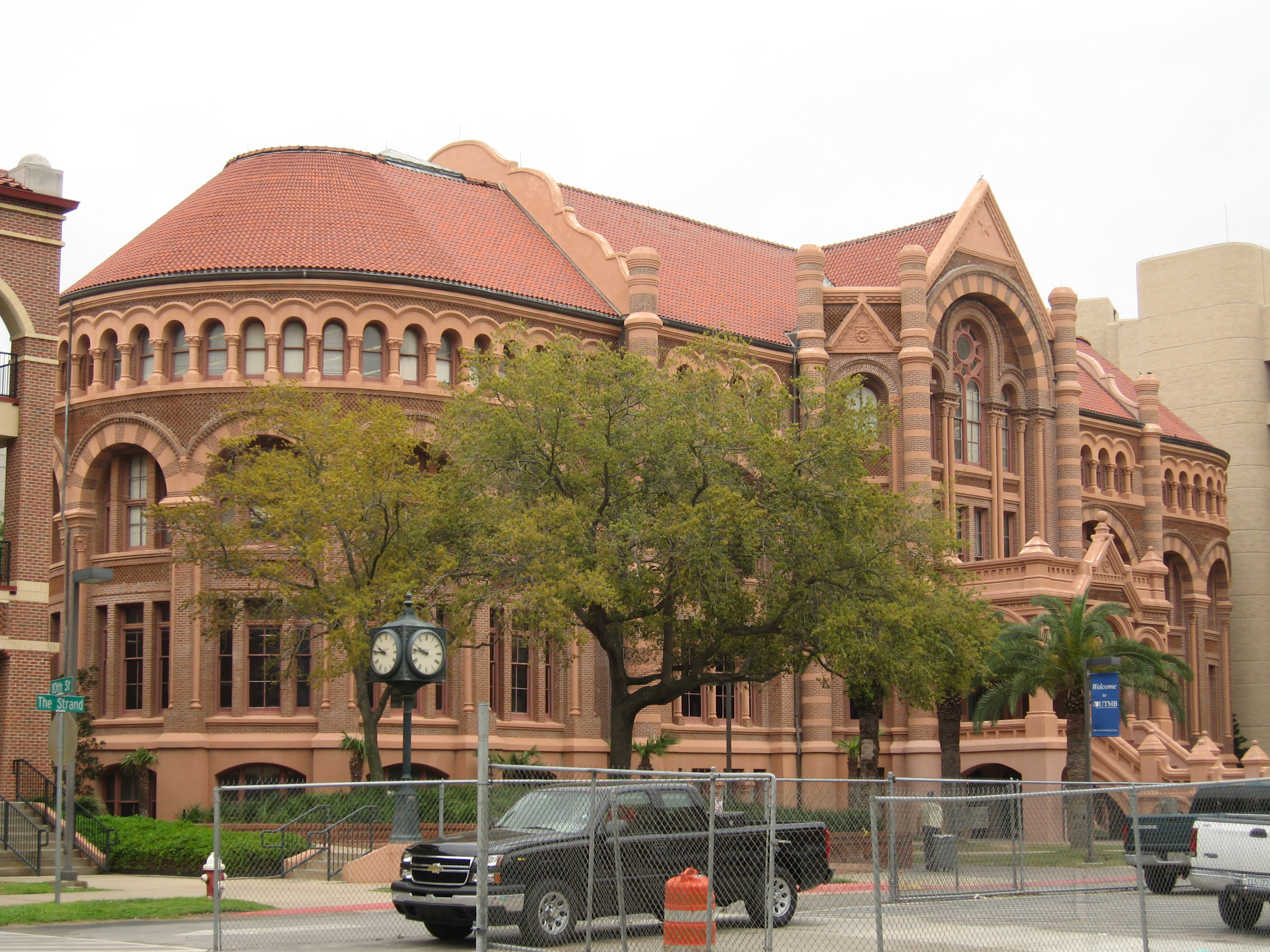
Ashbel Smith Building, also known as "Old Red Building," University of Texas Medical Branch, Galveston

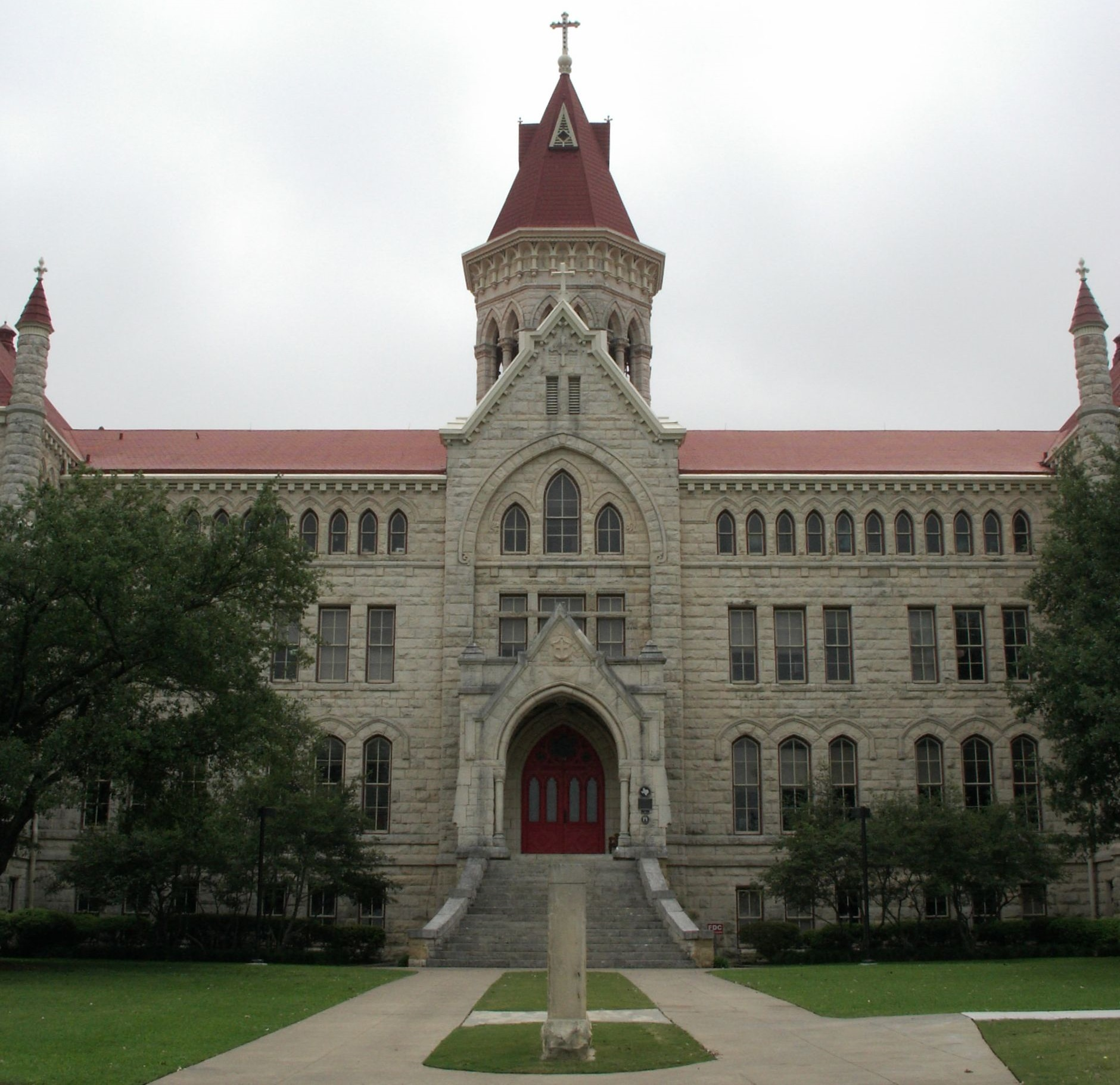
Main Building, St. Edward's University, Austin

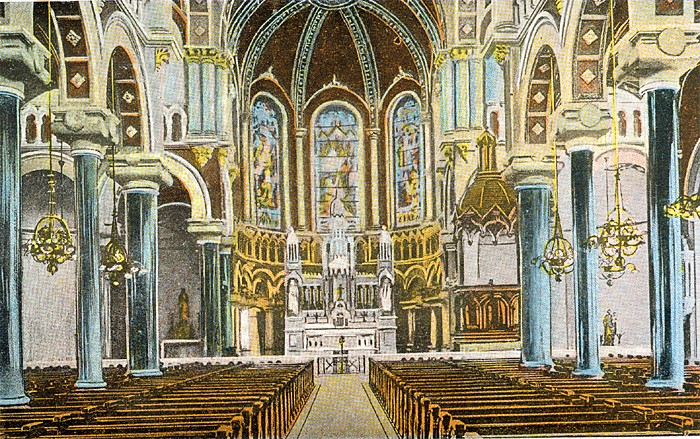
Sacred Heart, Tampa, Fla.-interior

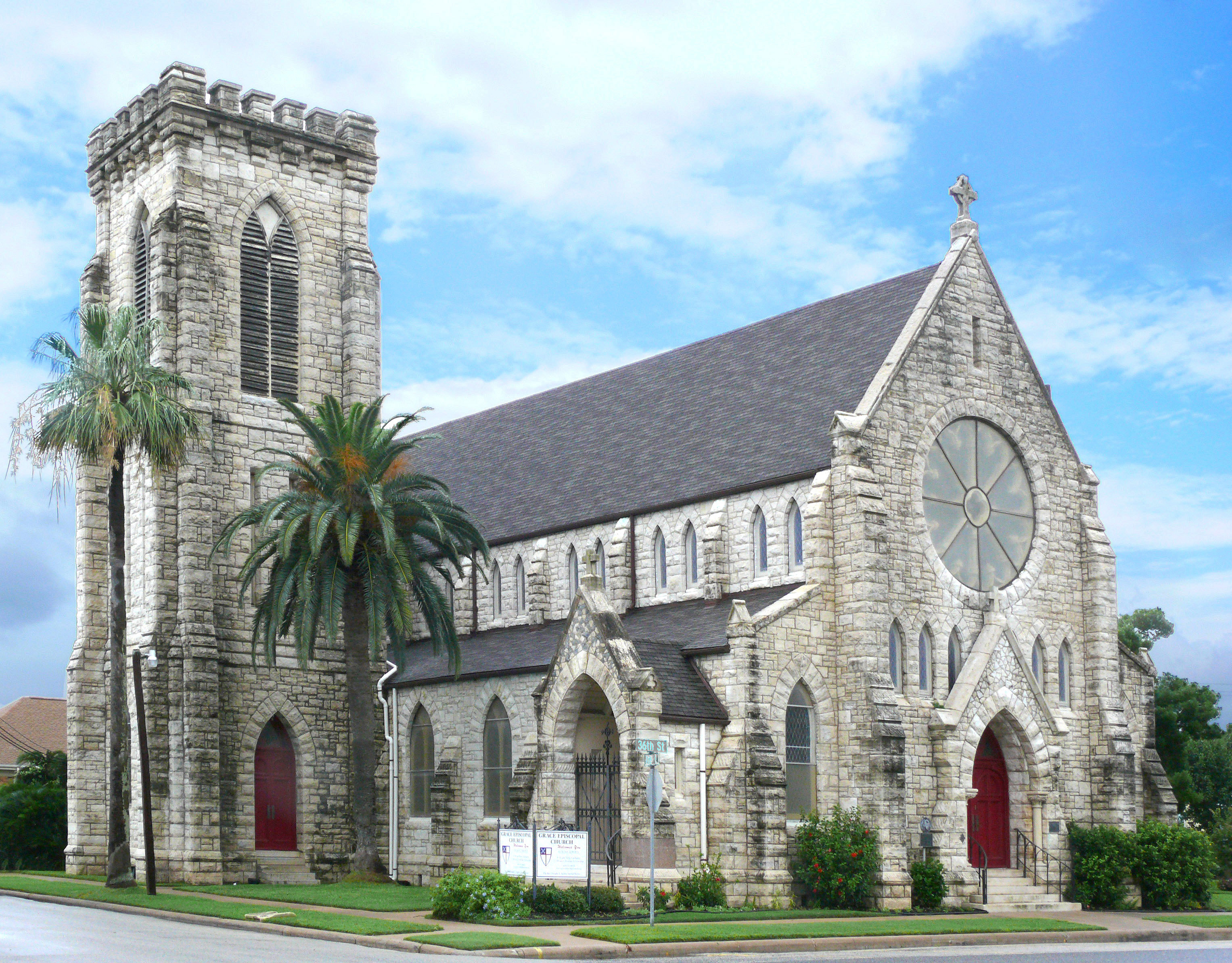
Grace Episcopal Church (Galveston, Texas)

== Bibliography ==
- Barnstone, Howard (1993). The Galveston That Was (Second ed.). College Station, TX: Texas A&M University Press. ISBN 978-0-89096-887-1.
- Beasley, Ellen; Fox, Stephen (1996). Galveston Architecture Guide. Houston: Rice University Press. ISBN 0-89263-346-8.
- Henry, Jay C. (1993). Architecture in Texas, 1895–1945. Austin: University of Texas Press. ISBN 0-292-73072-1.
- Houghton, Dorothy Knox Howe; Bradley, Barrie Scardino; Howe, Katherine S.; Blackburn, Sadie Gwin (1998). Houston's Forgotten Heritage: Landscapes, Houses, Interiors, 1824–1914. College Station, TX: Texas A&M University. ISBN 978-1-62349-246-5.
- Robinson, Willard B. (1981). Gone From Texas: Our Lost Architectural Heritage. College Station, TX: Texas A&M University Press. ISBN 0-89096-106-9.
- Wooten, Heather Green (2013). Old Red: Pioneering Medical Education in Texas. College Station, TX: Texas A&M University Press. ISBN 9780876112946.
