= Sonnentheil House =

Historic house in Galveston, Texas

- Interactive map of the Sonnentheil House area

General information
- Location: 1826 Sealy Avenue, Galveston, Texas, United States
- Coordinates: 29°18.148′N 94°47.252′W

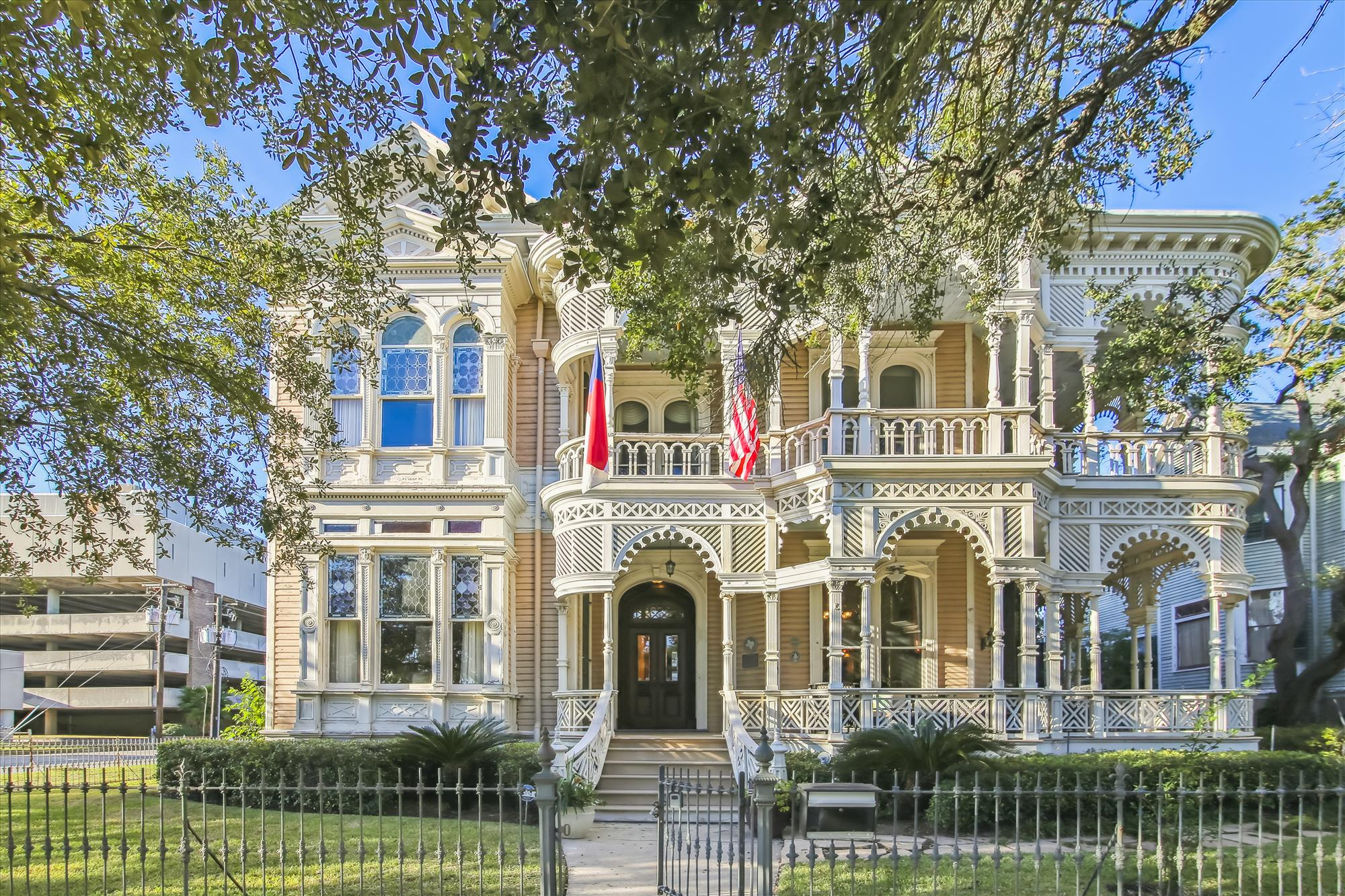
Historic Sonnentheil House 2022

The Sonnentheil House is a historic house located at 1826 Sealy Ave. in Galveston, Texas.

After the original Sonnenthiel home was destroyed in the Great Fire of 1885, Jacob Sonnentheil bought a double lot on the northeast corner of 19th and Sealy and built this house. The house was described as having been "planned from the inside out" meaning the interior spaces were planned prior to the exterior design.

No architect claimed it at the time of construction, but it is suspected to be designed by Nicholas J. Clayton, because of stylistic elements common to Clayton's work.

The Texas Historic Landmark inscription states: Built in 1886-87 for German native Jacob Sonnentheil (died 1908), this home probably was designed by prominent Galveston architect Nicholas J. Clayton. Sonnentheil served with the Confederacy during the Civil War and operated a wholesale dry goods store on The Strand in Galveston. The Sonnentheil house displays influences of Eastlake, Gothic, and Italianate architectural styling. Outstanding features include the finely crafted double gallery

Lee Trentham, a wealthy Houston chemical engineer and businessman purchased the house in 1976 and spent $275,000 restoring it. The Sonnentheil Home was owned by Arthur Louis Schechter from 1987 until 1999.
