= Ashbel Smith Building =

- U.S. National Register of Historic Places
- Texas State Antiquities Landmark
- Recorded Texas Historic Landmark
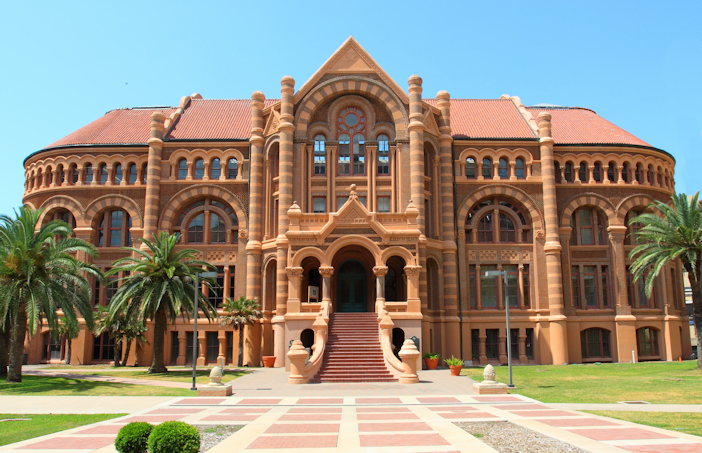
- Ashbel Smith Building in 2009

- Location within Texas Location within the United States
- Location: 916 Strand (Ave. B), Galveston, Texas
- Coordinates: 29°18′48″N 94°46′44″W
- Area: 1.8 acres (0.73 ha)
- Built: 1891
- Architect: Nicholas J. Clayton
- Architectural style: Romanesque
- NRHP reference No.: 69000203
- TSAL No.: 8200001367
- RTHL No.: 7539

Significant dates
- Added to NRHP: October 28, 1969
- Designated TSAL: January 1, 1981
- Designated RTHL: 1969

The Ashbel Smith Building, also known as Old Red, is a Romanesque Revival building located in Galveston, Texas. It was built in 1891 with red brick and sandstone. Nicholas J. Clayton was the architect. It was the first University of Texas Medical Branch building.

In 1949, the building named for Ashbel Smith, a Republic of Texas diplomat and one of the founders of the University of Texas System. The building was registered as a Texas Historical Landmark in 1969 and renovated in 1985.

In 2008, Old Red was flooded with six feet of water by Hurricane Ike. It was also one of the few buildings to survive the Galveston Hurricane of 1900.

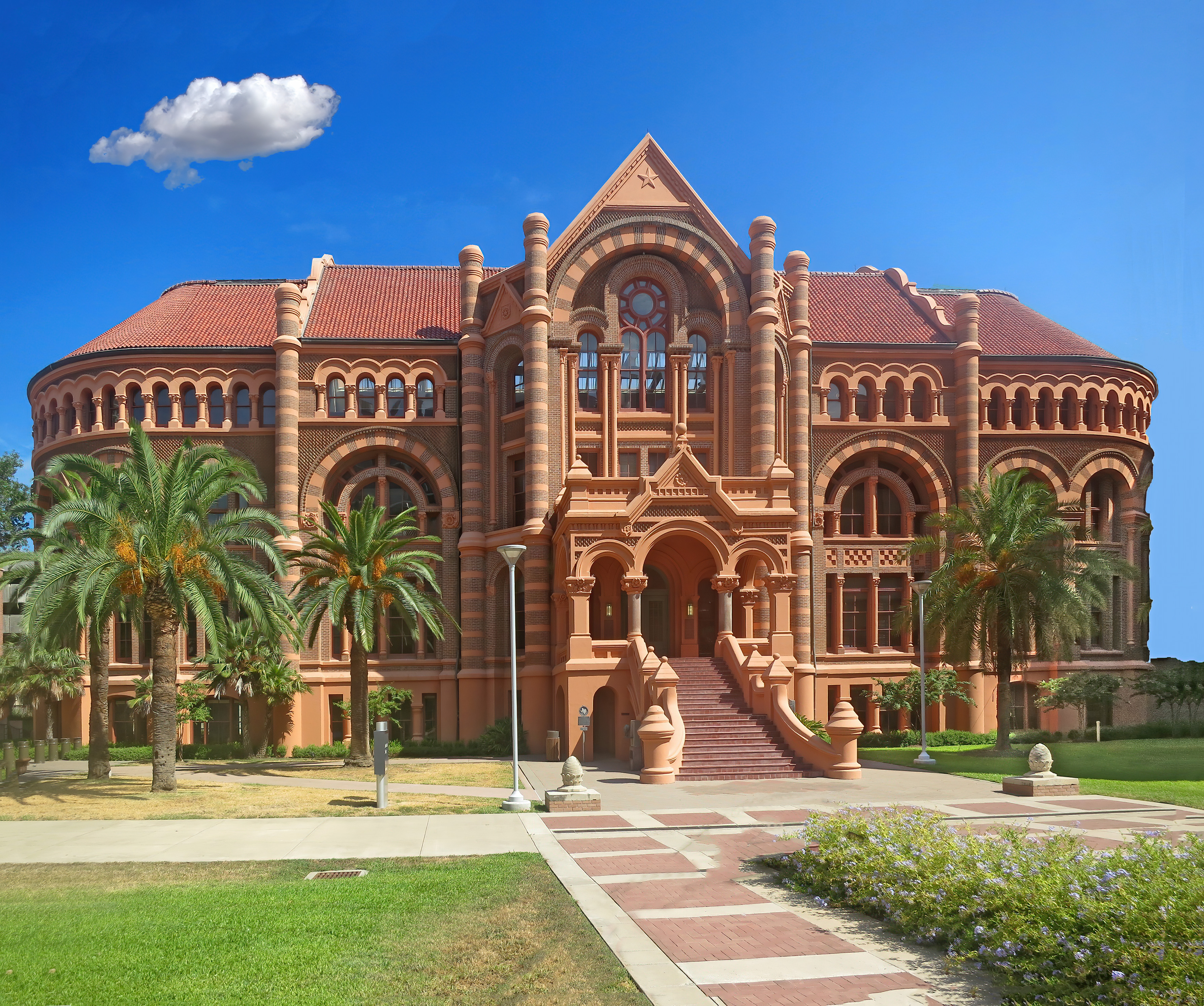
This was the first University of Texas Medical Branch building

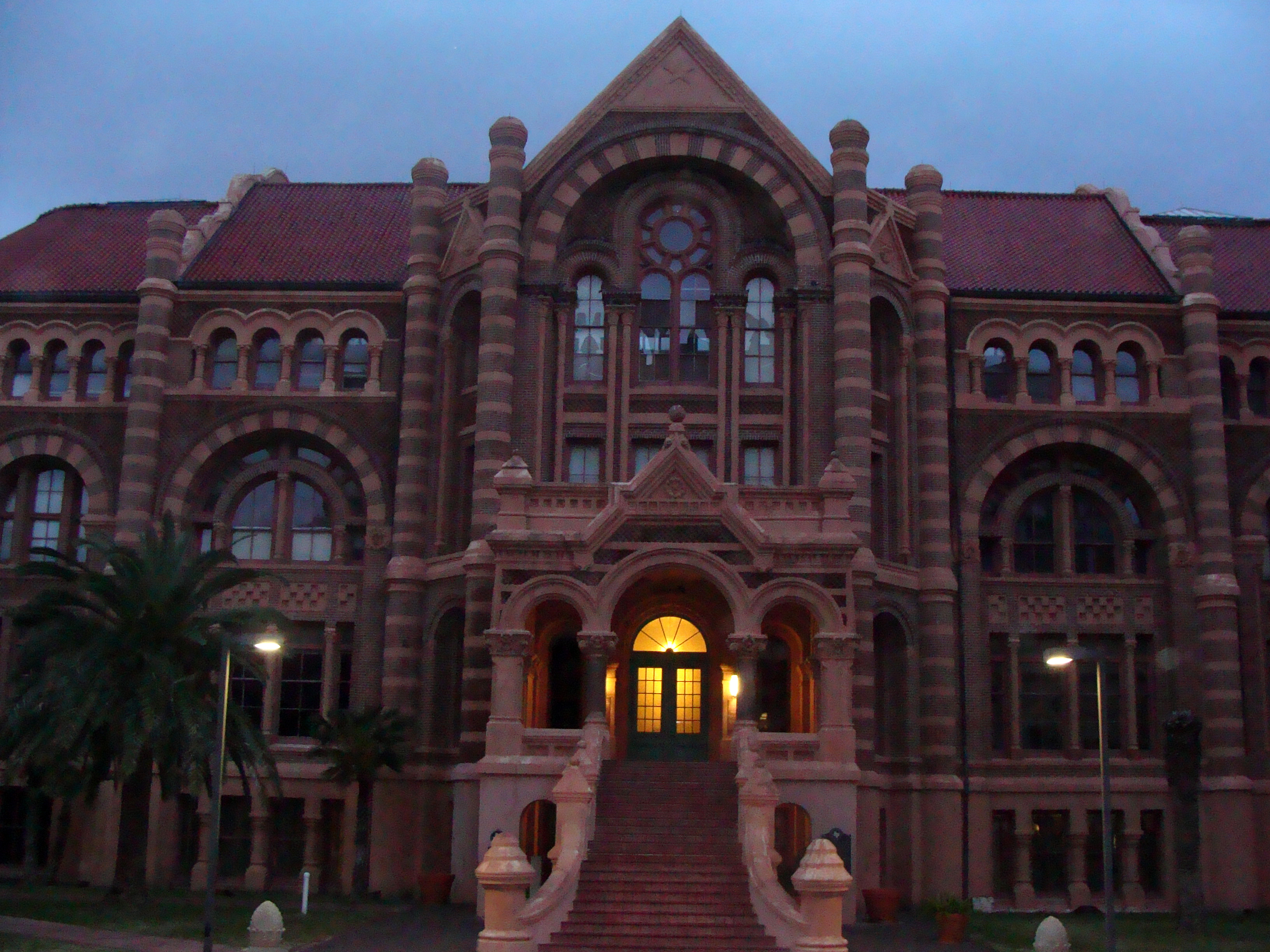

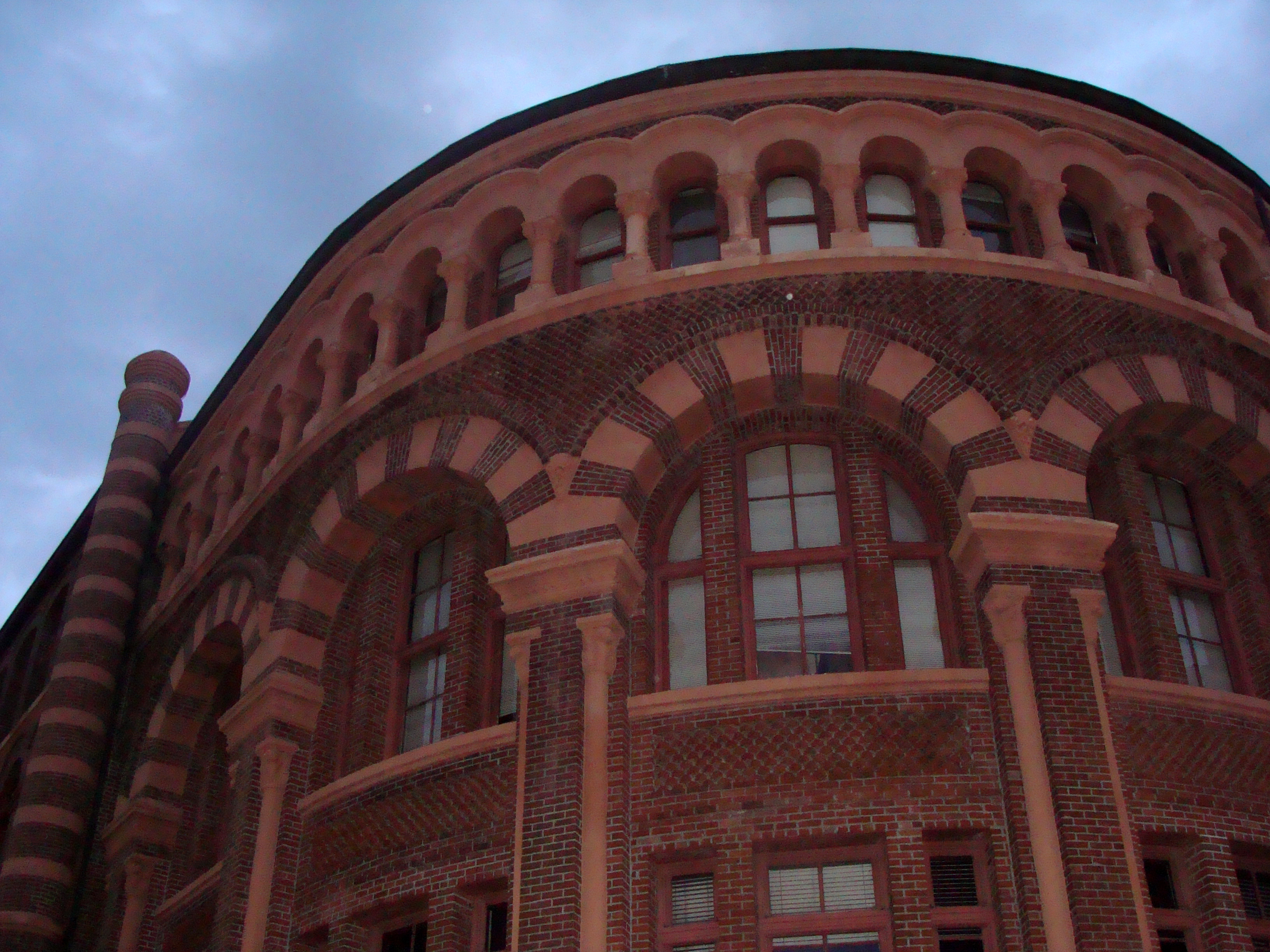

== See also ==
- National Register of Historic Places listings in Galveston County, Texas
- Recorded Texas Historic Landmarks in Galveston County
