= Grace Episcopal Church (Galveston, Texas) =

Historic church in Galveston, Texas

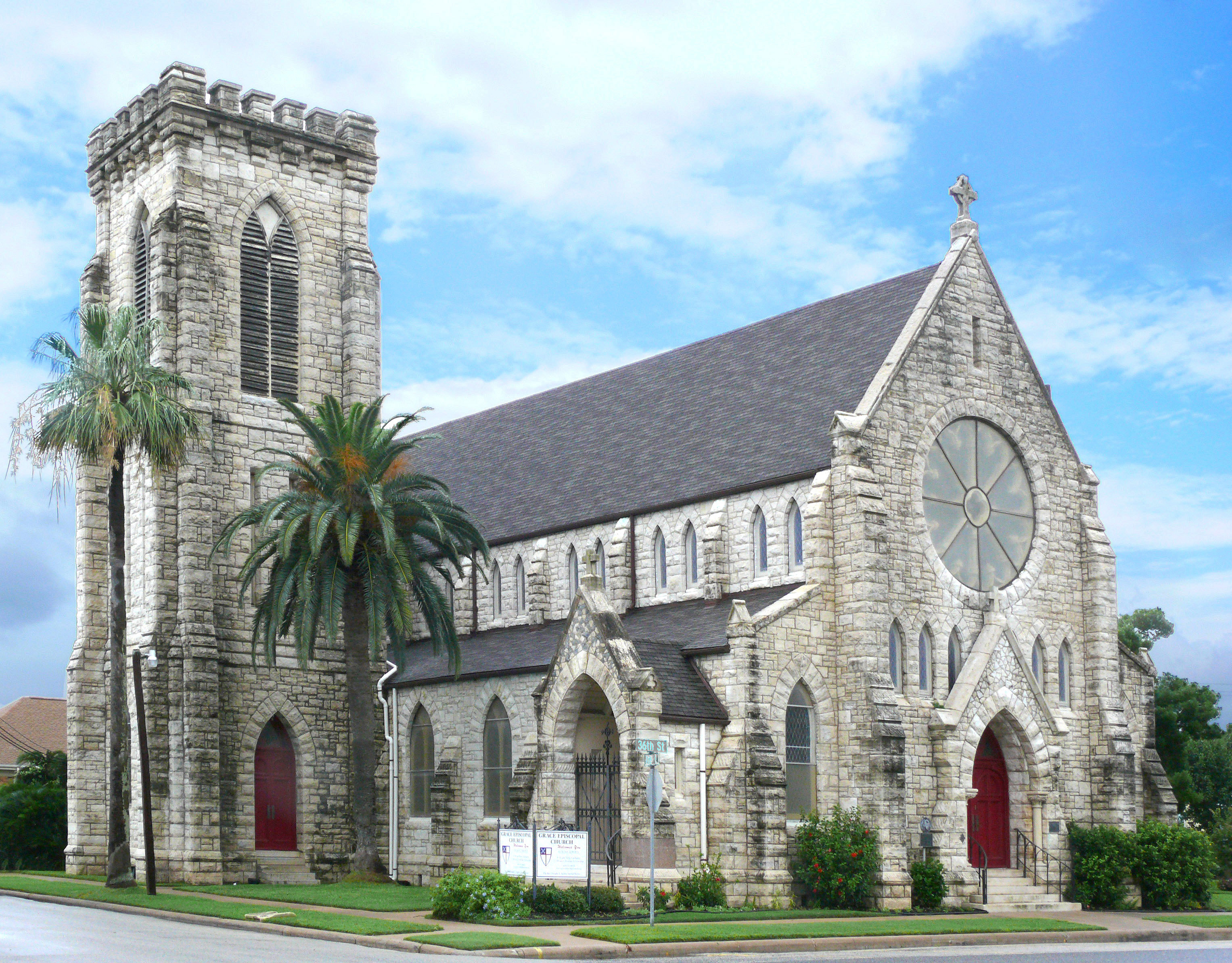
- Grace Episcopal Church in 2012

- Location within Texas Location within the United States
- 29°17′39″N 94°48′23″W
- Location: 1115 36th St., Galveston, Texas
- Country: United States
- Denomination: Episcopal
- Website: www.gracechurchgalveston.org

History
- Status: Church
- Founded: 1876
- Consecrated: 1895

Architecture
- Functional status: Active
- Architect(s): Nicholas J. Clayton, architect Silas McBee, interior designer Thomas Darragh, contractor
- Style: Gothic Revival
- Years built: 1894-1895
- Construction cost: $30,000 USD

Specifications
- Length: 109 feet (33 m)
- Width: 50 feet (15 m)
- Materials: Limestone

Administration
- Province: Province VII
- Diocese: Episcopal Diocese of Texas
- Deanery: Galveston

Clergy
- Bishop: Rt. Rev. C. Andrew Doyle
- Dean: Rev. Jim Liberatore
- Grace Episcopal Church
- U.S. National Register of Historic Places
- Recorded Texas Historic Landmark
- NRHP reference No.: 75001980
- RTHL No.: 7477

Significant dates
- Added to NRHP: April 3, 1975
- Designated RTHL: 1967

Grace Episcopal Church is a historic church at 1115 36th Street in Galveston, Texas. It was built in 1894 and added to the National Register in 1975.

== History ==
The history of Grace Episcopal Church is traceable to a mission Sunday School founded by the Rectory of Trinity Church in Galveston, which was located for the convenience of suburban residents in the 1840s. In 1876, its members received permission from the rector to establish Grace Episcopal Church. Their first sanctuary was a wooden building at the corner of Avenue L and 36th Street.

Henry Rosenberg gifted $30,000 to Grace Episcopal Church for a new building. The church commissioned Nicholas J. Clayton to design a High Victorian Gothic church constructed of stone. The old building was moved down the street and the new building was completed in 1895.

== See also ==
- National Register of Historic Places listings in Galveston County, Texas
- Recorded Texas Historic Landmarks in Galveston County

== Bibliography ==
- Beasley, Ellen; Fox, Stephen (1996). Galveston Architecture Guide. Houston: Rice University Press. ISBN 0-89263-346-8.
