= Sacred Heart Catholic Church and School =

Historic church in Texas, United States

- U.S. National Register of Historic Places
- Recorded Texas Historic Landmark
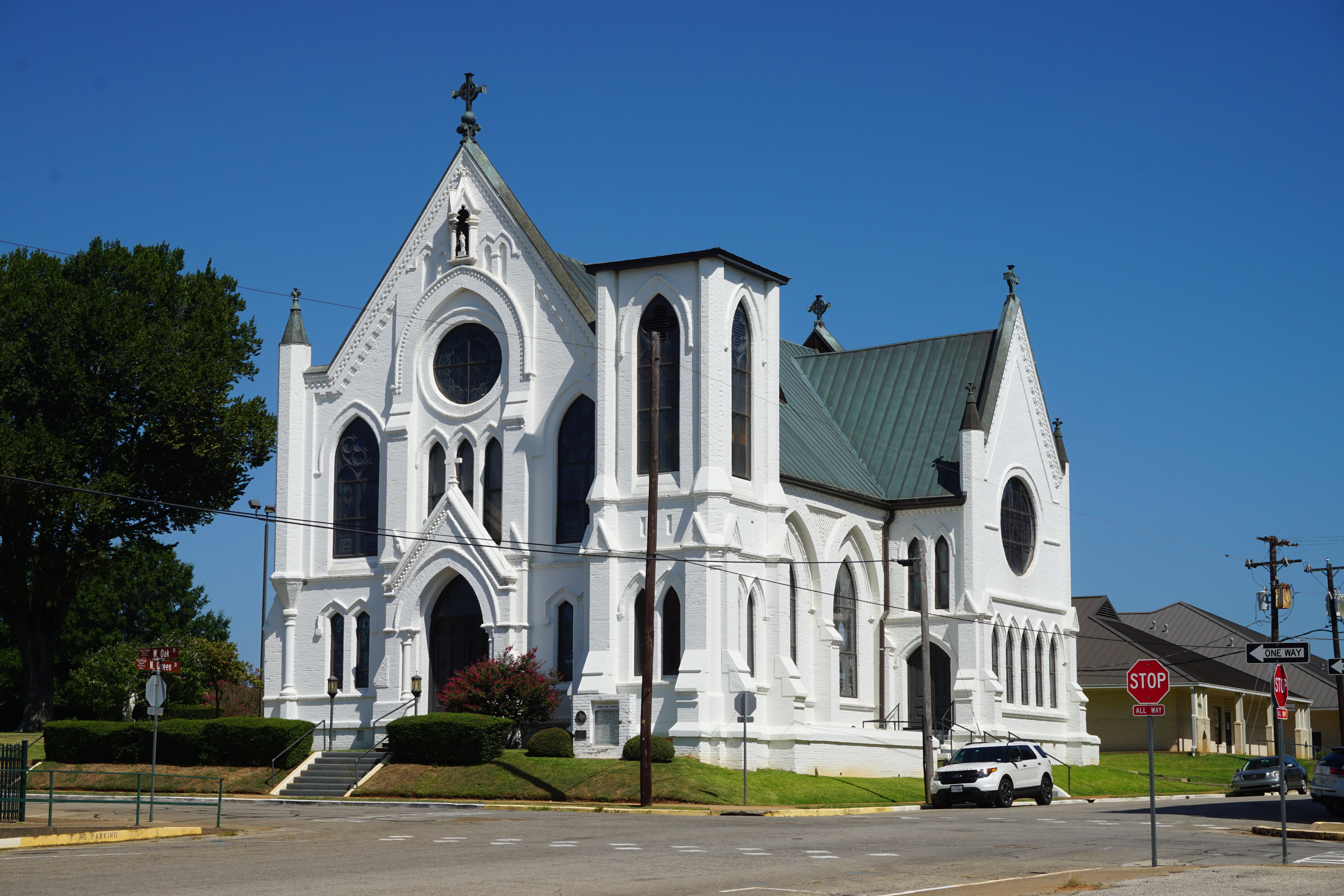
- Sacred Heart Church in 2017

- Location within Texas Location within the United States
- Location: 503 N. Queen St., Palestine, Texas
- Coordinates: 31°45′45″N 95°38′4″W
- Area: less than one acre
- Built: 1893
- Architect: Nicholas J. Clayton
- Architectural style: Gothic
- Website: Sacred Heart Catholic Church
- NRHP reference No.: 79002909
- RTHL No.: 8806

Significant dates
- Added to NRHP: December 6, 1979
- Designated RTHL: 1964

Sacred Heart Catholic Church and School is a historic church and school at 503 North Queen Street in Palestine, Texas. Built between 1890 and 1893, the structure was designed by prominent Texas architect Nicholas J. Clayton. It replaced an earlier Catholic church that was destroyed by fire.

It served the railroad workers stationed in Palestine, which had a large depot of the International–Great Northern Railroad. The railway deeded the site to Bishop Dubuis of the Diocese of Galveston. The bricks were locally made from mud from the Trinity River. It is the best example of Victorian Gothic architecture in North East Texas.

Additional plots of land were acquired in the years after the church was built. The diocese added a parochial school and a cemetery.

It was built in 1968. The church and school were added to the National Register of Historic Places in 1979.

== See also ==
- National Register of Historic Places listings in Anderson County, Texas
- Recorded Texas Historic Landmarks in Anderson County
