= National Register of Historic Places listings in Colorado County, Texas =

Location of Colorado County in Texas

This is a list of the National Register of Historic Places listings in Colorado County, Texas.

This is intended to be a complete list of properties and districts listed on the National Register of Historic Places in Colorado County, Texas. There are two districts and five individual properties listed on the National Register in the county which includes two former properties. Three individually listed properties are Recorded Texas Historic Landmarks including one that is also a State Antiquities Landmark. One district contains additional Recorded Texas Historic Landmarks.

This National Park Service list is complete through NPS recent listings posted August 21, 2026.

== Current listings ==
The locations of National Register properties and districts may be seen in a mapping service provided.

	Name on the Register	Image	Date listed	Location	City or town	Description
1	Colorado County Courthouse	Colorado County Courthouse	July 12, 1976 (#76002015)	Bounded by Milam, Spring, Travis and Walnut Sts. 29°42′21″N 96°32′23″W	Columbus	State Antiquities Landmark, Recorded Texas Historic Landmark; part of Colorado County Courthouse Historic District; Neoclassical building erected in 1890-1891 in the form of a Greek cross
2	Colorado County Courthouse Historic District	Colorado County Courthouse Historic District	June 23, 1978 (#78002907)	Roughly bounded by Preston, Walnut, Milam, Front, Washington, and Live Oak Sts. 29°42′22″N 96°32′26″W	Columbus	Includes State Antiquities Landmark, several Recorded Texas Historic Landmarks
3	Eagle Lake Commercial Historic District	Eagle Lake Commercial Historic District	June 5, 2007 (#07000494)	100-416 E. Main St., 101-108 W. Main St., 101-124 Commerce St., 101-201 N. McCarty Ave., and 100-203 E. Post Office St. 29°35′21″N 96°20′02″W	Eagle Lake	
4	Harrison-Hastedt House	Harrison-Hastedt House	March 22, 2004 (#04000231)	236 Preston St. 29°42′32″N 96°32′16″W	Columbus	Recorded Texas Historic Landmark
5	Old Spanish Trail from US 90 to I-10	Old Spanish Trail from US 90 to I-10	April 16, 2013 (#13000176)	County Road 268 between U.S. Route 90 and a northern access road for I-10; 29°42′23″N 96°31′27″W	Columbus vicinity	
6	Stafford Bank and Opera House	Stafford Bank and Opera House	May 8, 1973 (#73002276)	Milan and Spring Sts. 29°42′19″N 96°32′25″W	Columbus	Recorded Texas Historic Landmark; part of Colorado County Courthouse Historic District; Second Empire style building completed in 1886.
7	State Highway 3 Bridge at the Colorado River	State Highway 3 Bridge at the Colorado River	October 10, 1996 (#96001111)	U.S. Route 90, 0.6 miles east of its junction with Loop 329; 29°42′23″N 96°32′11″W	Columbus	Three-span Parker through truss bridge built in 1932.

== Former listings ==
	Name on the Register	Image	Date listed	Date removed	Location	City or town	Description
1	John Stafford House		May 3, 1976 (#76002016)	August 30, 1994	South of Columbus on U.S. Route 71	Columbus vicinity	Destroyed by fire in July, 1994.
2	Zimmerscheidt-Leyendecker House	Zimmerscheidt-Leyendecker House	March 30, 1979 (#79002926)	March 19, 1982	South of Columbus on U.S. Route 71	Columbus vicinity	Destroyed by arsonist on May 20, 1980.

== See also ==
- National Register of Historic Places listings in Texas
- Recorded Texas Historic Landmarks in Colorado County
