= Stafford Opera House =

Historic former theater in Texas

- Stafford Bank and Opera House
- U.S. National Register of Historic Places
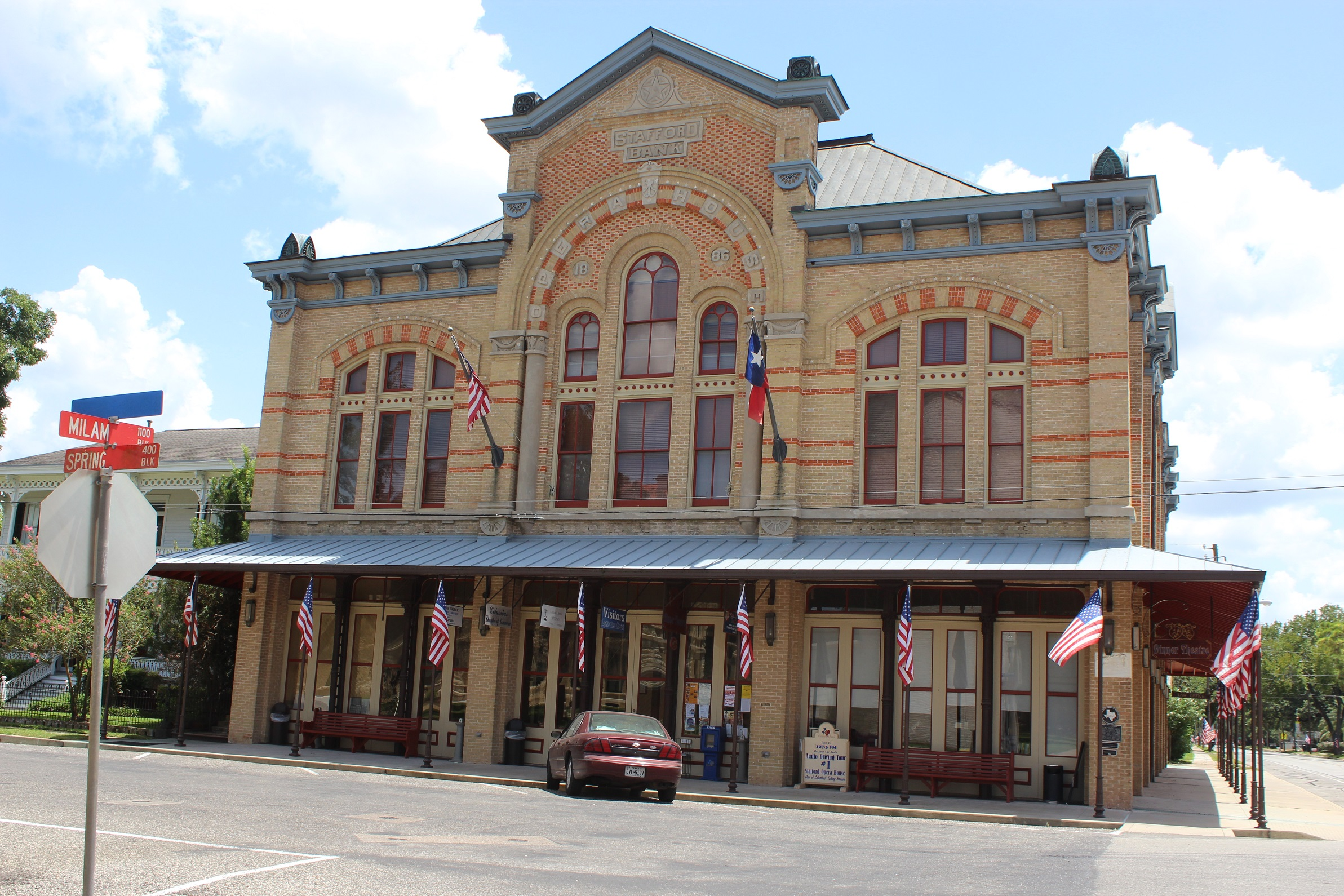

- Location within Texas
- Location: Milan and Spring Sts., Columbus, Texas
- Coordinates: 29°42′21″N 96°32′24″W
- Area: 0.3 acres (0.12 ha)
- Built: 1886
- Architect: Nicholas J. Clayton
- Architectural style: Second Empire
- NRHP reference No.: 73002276
- Added to NRHP: May 8, 1973

The Stafford Opera House, originally the R. E. Stafford Bank and Opera House, is a historic building at 425 Spring Street in Columbus, Texas, United States. It was built in 1886 by cattleman and businessman Robert E. Stafford (born 1834- died 1890). It is listed on the National Register of Historic Places. It is also a Texas Historic Landmark. A plaque commemorates its history. The first show it hosted was "As in a Looking Glass" starring Lillian Russell. Magician Harry Houdini was another famous performer who appeared at the theater.

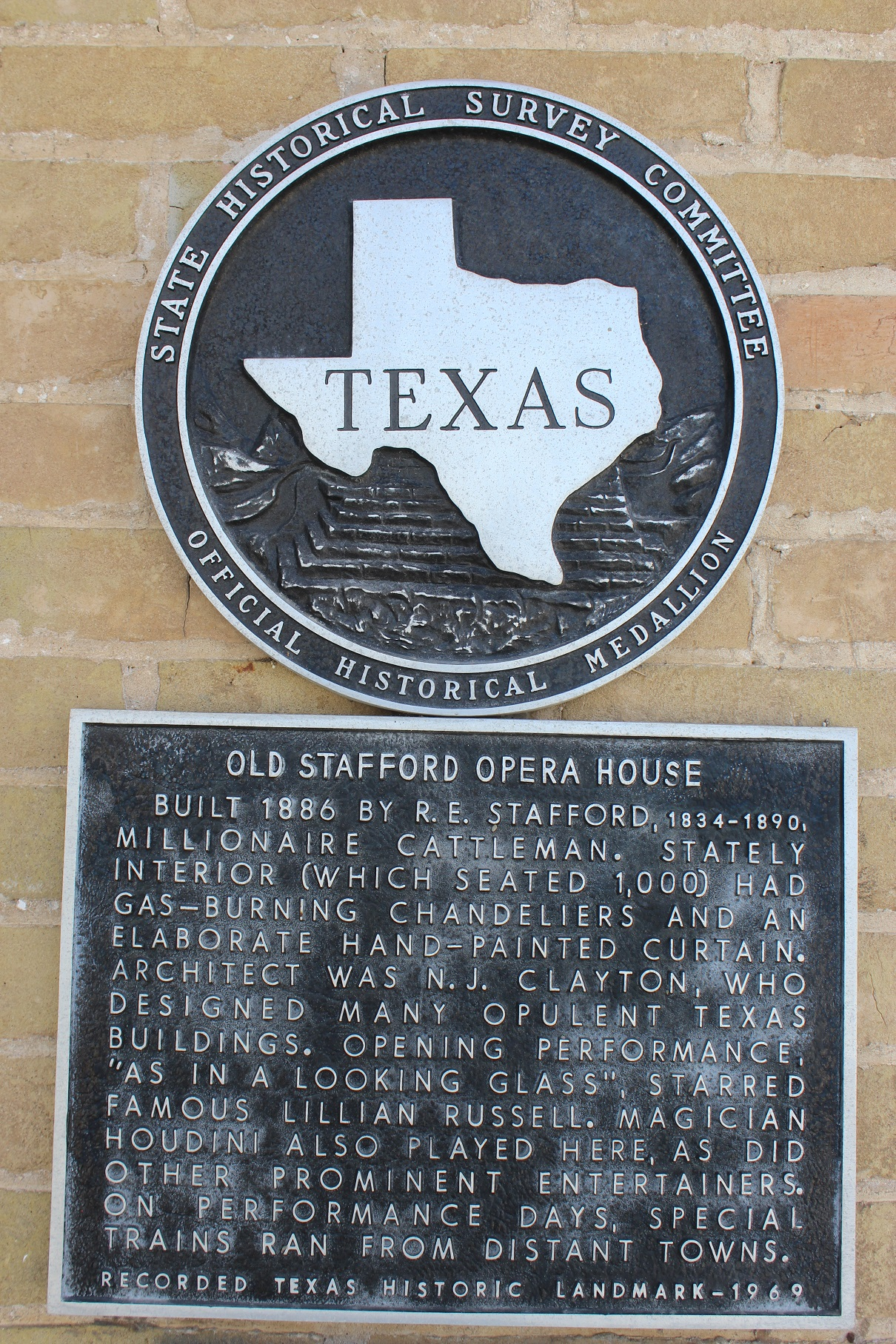

An example of Second Empire architecture, bank and dry goods store were on the first floor and the theater on the second. Architect Nicholas Joseph Clayton of Galveston designed it. A brick building, it is decorated with articulated arched windows and polychromatic brick patterning.

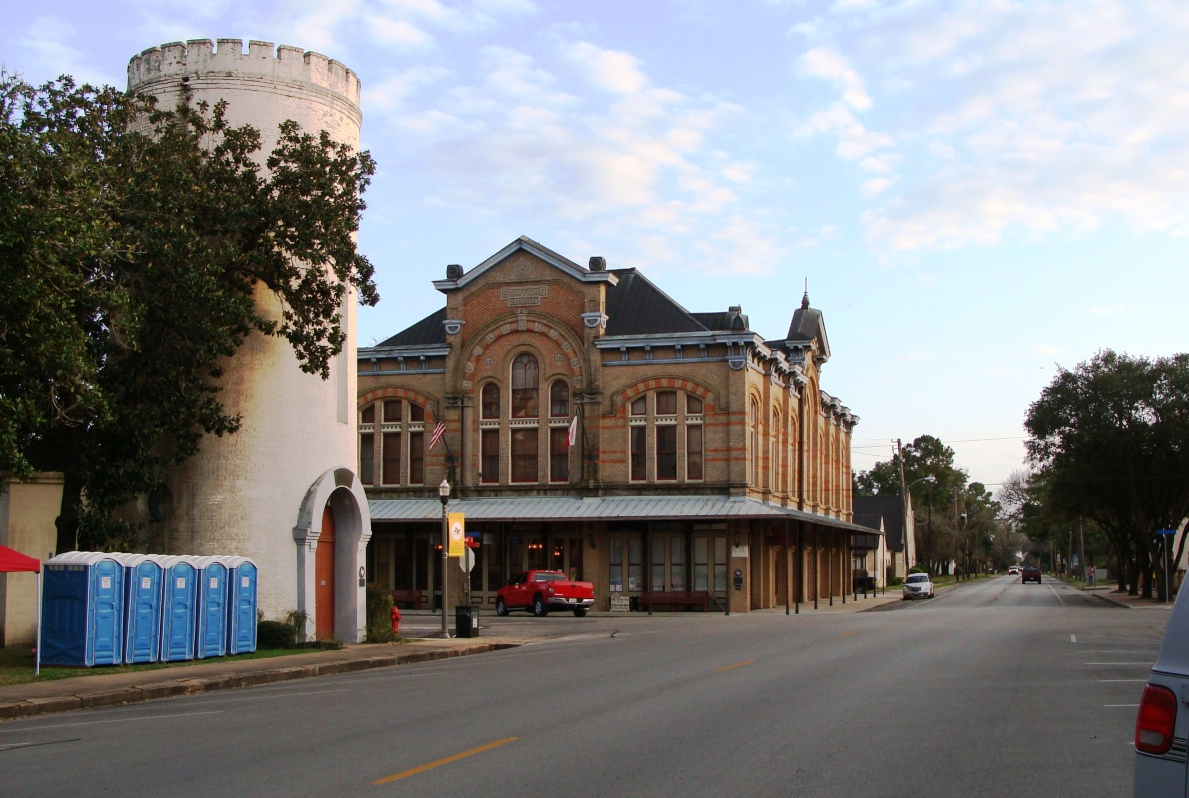

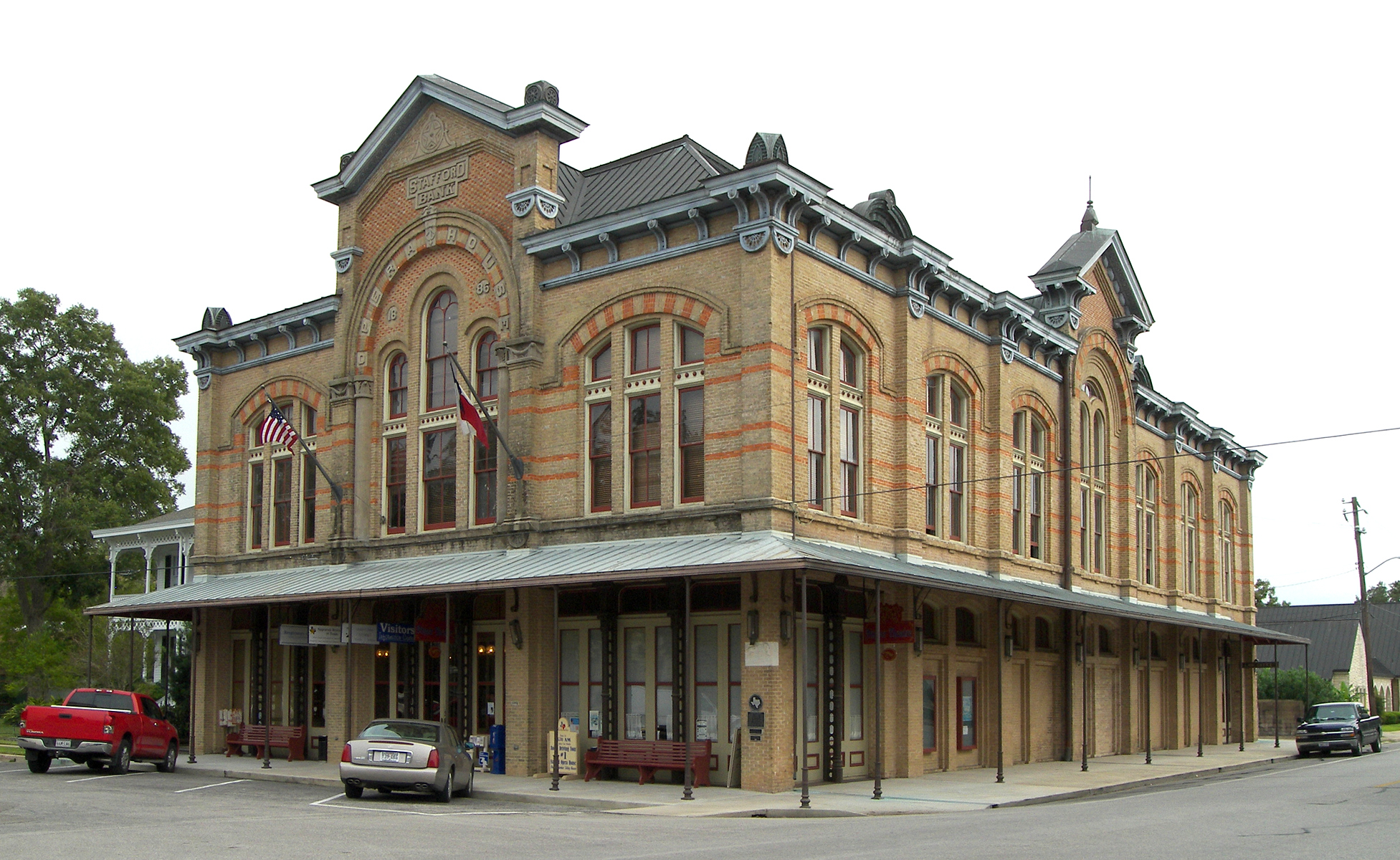
In 2008

It was bought and used as a Ford dealership. It also was used as an arena for basketball games and boxing matches as well as a roller skating rink. During World War II, private apartments were built in the theater area upstairs. The building was purchased in the early 1970s by a preservation group and restored over the next 18 years. It was rededicated in 1990.

Stafford built a home next door to the building the year it was built, 1886. The John Stafford House owned by his brother and business partner was also listed on the National Register until it burned in 1994.

== See also ==
- National Register of Historic Places listings in Colorado County, Texas
- Recorded Texas Historic Landmark
- List of Recorded Texas Historic Landmarks
