= First Presbyterian Church (Galveston, Texas) =

Historic church in Texas, United States

- U.S. National Register of Historic Places
- Recorded Texas Historic Landmark
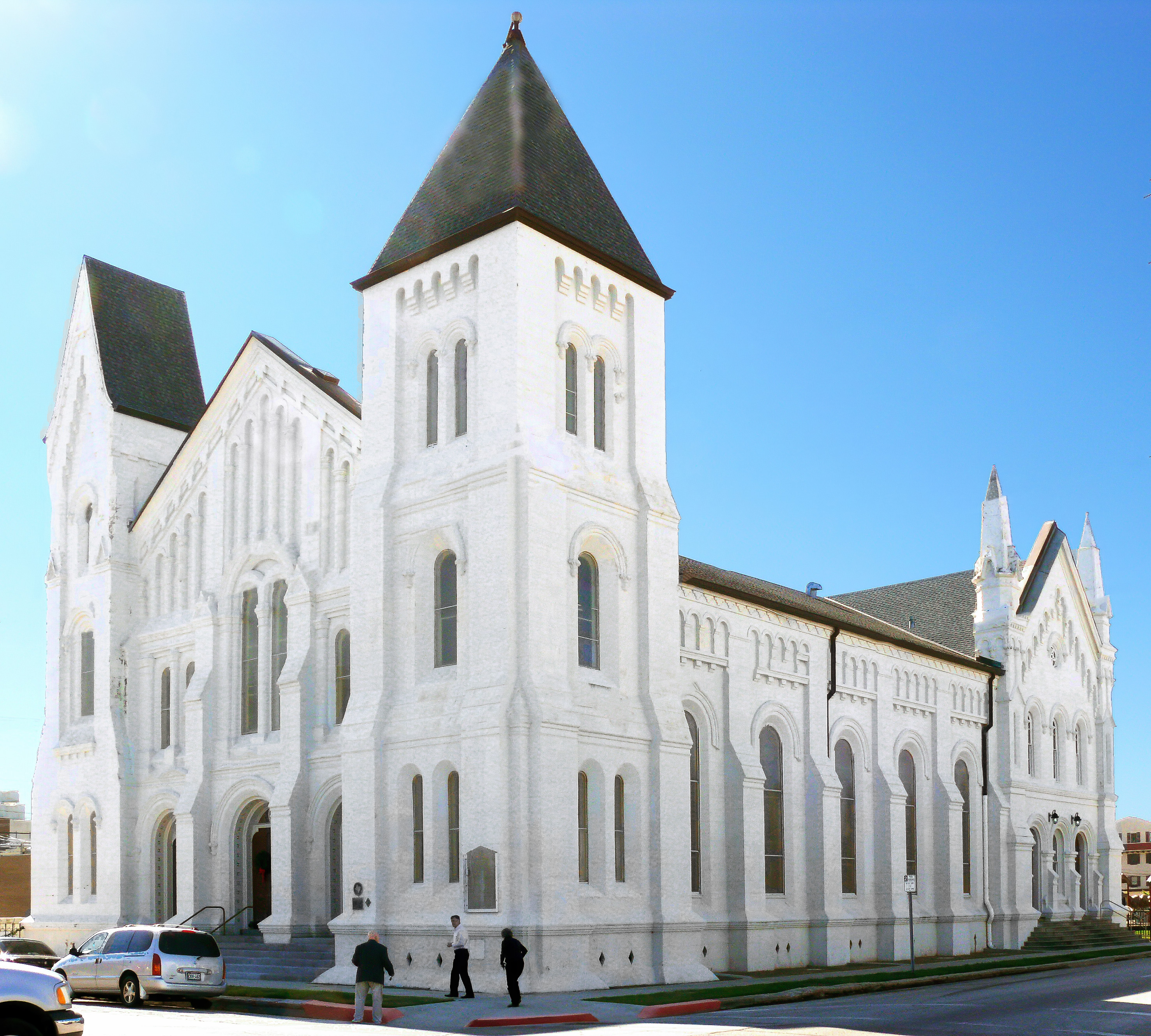
- First Presbyterian in 2012

- Location within Texas Location within the United States
- Location: 1903 Church St., Galveston, Texas
- Coordinates: 29°18′15″N 94°47′19″W
- Area: 1 acre (0.40 ha)
- Built: 1872
- Architect: Nicholas J. Clayton, et al.
- Architectural style: Romanesque, Norman Romanesque
- Website: First Presbyterian Church
- NRHP reference No.: 79002942
- RTHL No.: 7444

Significant dates
- Added to NRHP: January 29, 1979
- Designated RTHL: 1968

First Presbyterian Church is a historic church building at 1903 Church Street in Galveston, Texas.

== History ==
A Presbyterian congregation met in Galveston as early as 1839, when Reverend John McCullough delivered sermons there. In May 1840, McCullough with two other ministers and an elder established a Presbytery.

The Presbyterian congregation was organized in 1840 with the assistance of missionaries from the United States, and it met in a wooden church building from 1843 to 1872, the first church building in Galveston. The current Romanesque building was constructed in 1872 and is considered one of the best examples of Norman architecture in the region. It was designed by Nicholas J. Clayton, a prominent early Texas architect. The church was added to the National Register of Historic Places in 1979. Currently, the congregation is affiliated with the Presbyterian Church (U.S.A.), the Synod of the Sun, and of New Covenant Presbytery.

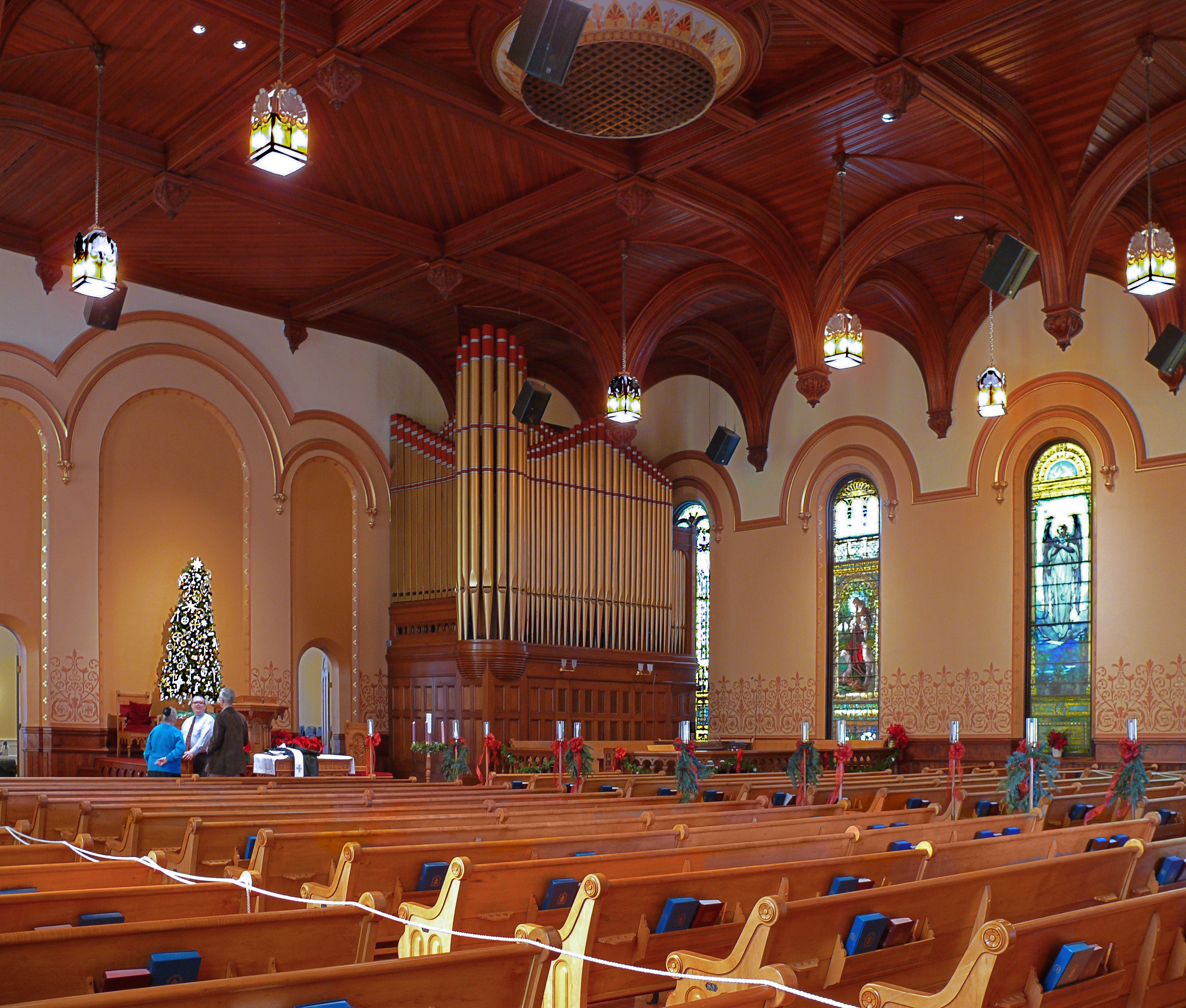
Church Interior

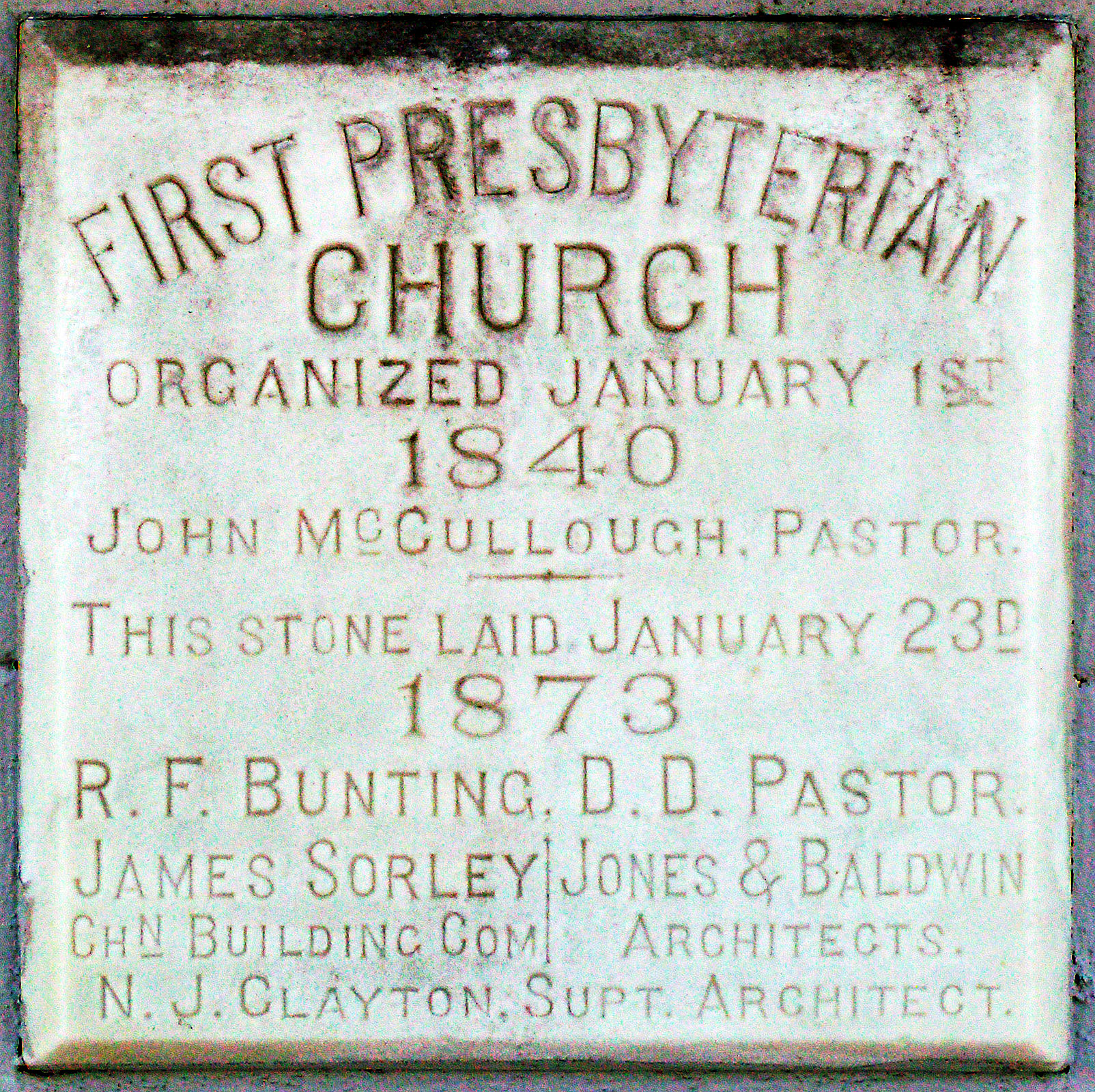
Dedication Stone

== See also ==
- National Register of Historic Places listings in Galveston County, Texas
- Recorded Texas Historic Landmarks in Galveston County

== Bibliography ==
- Beasley, Ellen; Fox, Stephen (1996). Galveston Architectural Guidebook. Houston: Rice University Press. ISBN 0-89263-345-X.
- Red, William S. (1915). "Allen's Reminscences of Texas, 1838−1842". Southwestern Historical Quarterly. 18 (3): 287−304.
