= Fort Bend County Courthouse =

- U.S. National Register of Historic Places
- Recorded Texas Historic Landmark
- Texas State Antiquities Landmark
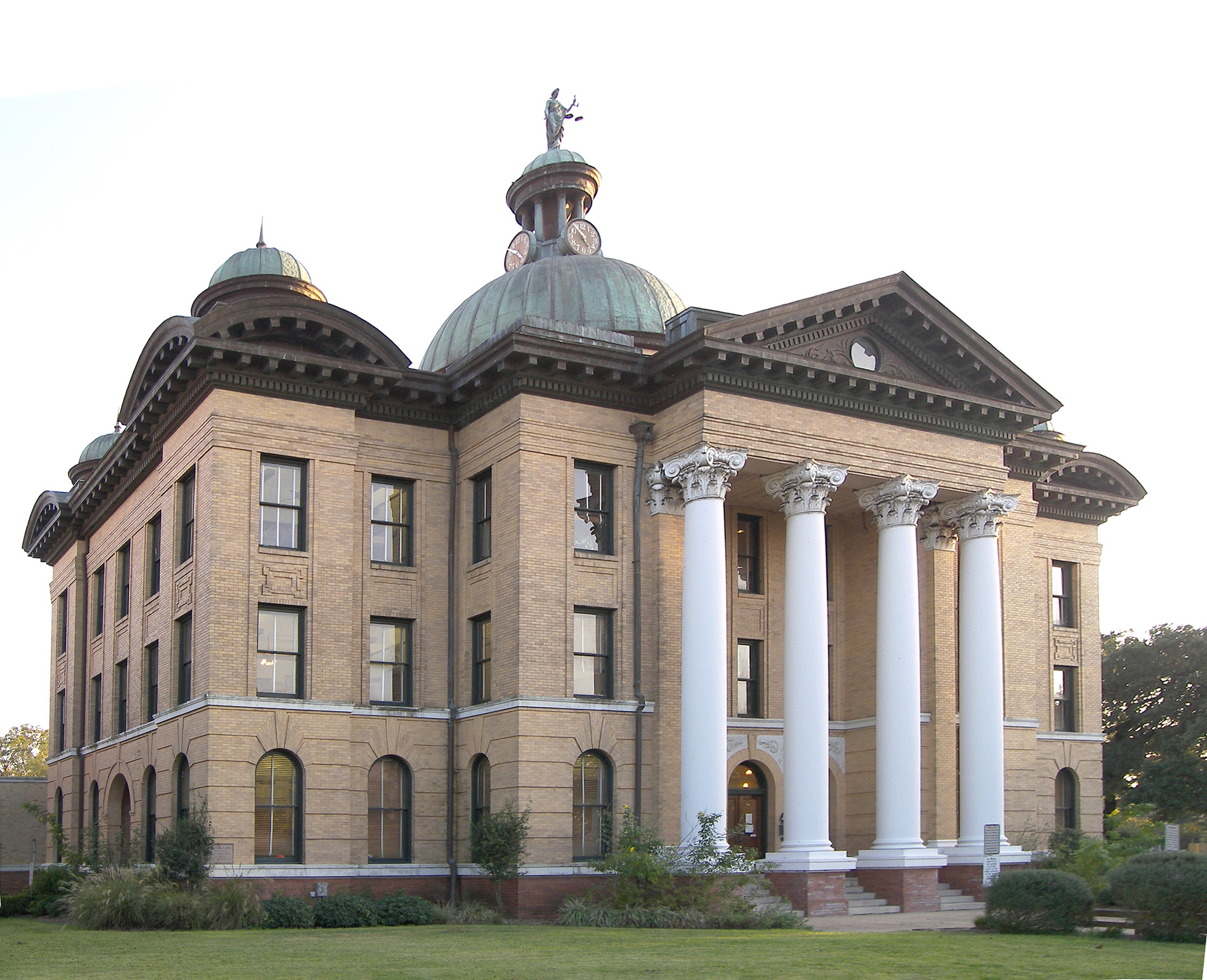
- The courthouse in 2008

- Location within Texas Location within the United States
- Interactive map showing the location of Fort Bend County Courthouse
- Location: 400 Jackson St., Richmond, Texas
- Coordinates: 29°34′52″N 95°45′41″W
- Area: 1.3 acres (0.53 ha)
- Built: 1908
- Architect: C.H. Page, Jr. & Bros.
- Architectural style: Classical Revival
- NRHP reference No.: 80004119
- RTHL No.: 5157008994
- TSAL No.: 8200000263

Significant dates
- Added to NRHP: March 13, 1980
- Designated RTHL: 1980
- Designated TSAL: 1992

The Fort Bend County Courthouse is a historic courthouse located in Richmond, Texas, United States. It was built in 1908 by Charles Henry Page, who also designed several other Texas courthouses. It was listed on the National Register of Historic Places and Recorded Texas Historic Landmarks in 1980 and designated a Texas State Antiquities Landmark in 1992.

== History ==
=== Background and establishment ===
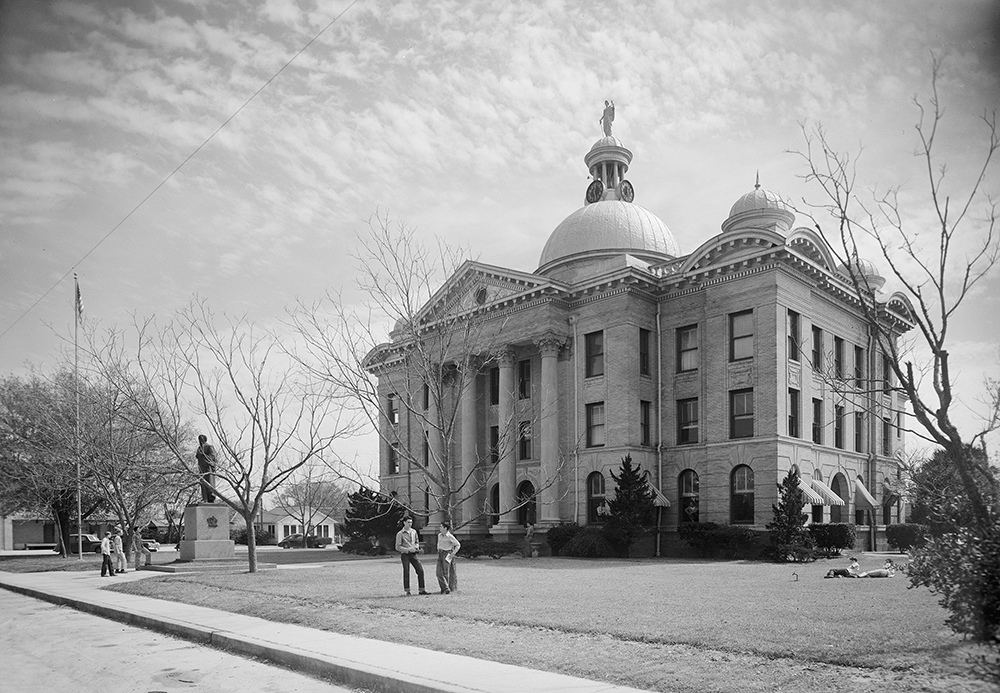
Fort Bend County Courthouse, 1948

Since its establishment in 1837, Fort Bend County has had five courthouses, the first four of which have since been demolished. Fort Bend County commissioned Charles Henry Page in late 1907 to design the building. The Texas Building Company handled construction for a total cost of $75,000. The new county courthouse was dedicated on January 19, 1909.

=== Expansions and renovations ===
Page oversaw a first expansion of the courthouse in 1935. A second addition was added in 1957. 1981 renovations were carried out by Ray Bailey Architects and restored or reconstructed many original features of the building, including the courtroom's internal balcony, which had been destroyed during the 1935 works.

In 2012, the need arose for further renovations, which aimed to restore the courthouse back to its original form; much of the original construction had been hidden under later works. The county raised $5.8 million total for renovations, mostly in private donors and grants. Fort Bend County itself allocated $2.4 million; other major donations included $2 million from the George Foundation and $271,000 from the Texas Historical Commission. Phoenix I Restoration and Construction and Bailey Architects spearheaded the renovation works, including removing the 1957 addition and restoring Page's expansion. At this time, an elevator and a fire sprinkler system were also installed, and the restrooms, HVAC system, and other infrastructure were renovated. Works began in January 2013, and the courthouse was re-dedicated on January 9, 2014.

== Architecture and layout ==
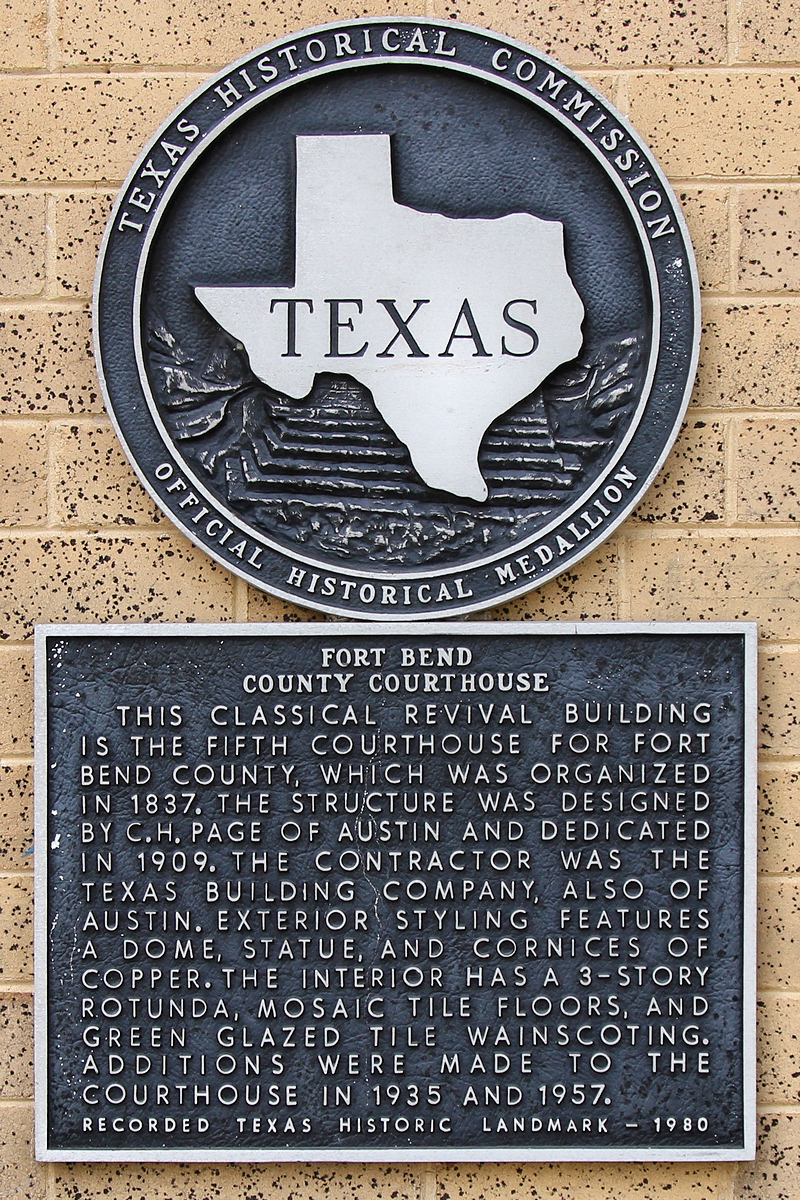
Recorded Texas Historic Landmark plaque

The Fort Bend County Courthouse is a three-story-tall structure with a cruciform footprint. Page favored the Neoclassical style for his buildings, which was popular for Texas public buildings constructed in the early 20th century. Other contemporary examples built by Page in this style include the Anderson, Hays, and Williamson County courthouses.

=== Exterior ===
The roof is capped by a large copper dome and is a significant contributor to Richmond's skyline. Atop this dome is a cupola, atop which in turn stands a copper statue of Lady Justice, who holds her signature scales of justice and a sword. Four clocks, one in each cardinal direction, are set in front of each side of the cupola. Four smaller domes topped with spires sit on top of each corner of the building, supported by rounded pediments. The entirety of the roof is decorated with heavy copper eaves, fascia, and cornices, especially underneath each side dome.

The facade is predominately beige brickwork with some stonework and decorative masonry throughout. The two side wings are slightly recessed from the front of the building. The front entrance on the north facade is dominated by a large portico. Four columns extend from the ground up to a protruding third-story entablature, which supports a triangular pediment with a circular window. This creates a sheltered porch for the front entrance, which consists of three sets of arched wooden doors. The other facades also contain side entrances in the form of arched double doors. The first-floor windows are arched, providing symmetry with the front entryway, while the top two floors have rectangular ones. Between the first-floor and second-floor windows runs a thin stone belt course. The facade of the first floor is decorated by raised brick banding.

The 1935 addition is similar, but simpler, in style to the original structure. It is missing several of the decorative elements found on the other facades. It has a flat stone roof and fasciae as opposed to continuing the original protruding copper roof details. The first-floor horizontal banding is missing, but the stone belt course is continued. The windows are also simpler and lack the wainscoting present on the original ones.

=== Interior ===
Inside, entry emerges into the central rotunda, which sits underneath the central dome and allows natural light by way of skylights. A balcony overlooks this main entry space, decorated by ornate fencing. The first floor contains the reception, courtroom, meeting rooms, and county judge offices. On the second floor are more offices and access to the courtroom gallery; and the third and top floor contains the courthouse library and archives, county commissioner's office, and conference rooms. The 1935 annex was originally meant to house the jail and was intended to be four stories, but construction plans changed just prior to the groundbreaking.

== Monuments ==
Several commemorative monuments and memorials are situated throughout the grounds. Historical plaques have been placed at the courthouse to mark its own history; others have been placed in remembrance of specific events or people.

Upon the courthouse's simultaneous listing on the National Register of Historic Places and as a Recorded Texas Historic Landmark in 1980, a historical plaque summarizing its history was installed next to the front entrance.

On the northeast corner of the property sits a historic marker for Constantine W. Buckley, a prominent Texas politician and district judge.

Two prominent Fort Bend County residents have been memorialized with portraits hung inside the courthouse. In 2021, a portrait of Walter Moses Burton, the first Black county sheriff in the United States, was installed at the courthouse as part of Black History Month celebrations. A photograph of civil rights activist Arizona Fleming was installed next to Burton's on March 23, 2023. Fleming was one of the plaintiffs in the US Supreme Court case Terry v. Adams, which overturned Fort Bend County's longstanding Jim Crow law that barred non-white citizens from primary elections.

=== Mirabeau B. Lamar Statue ===
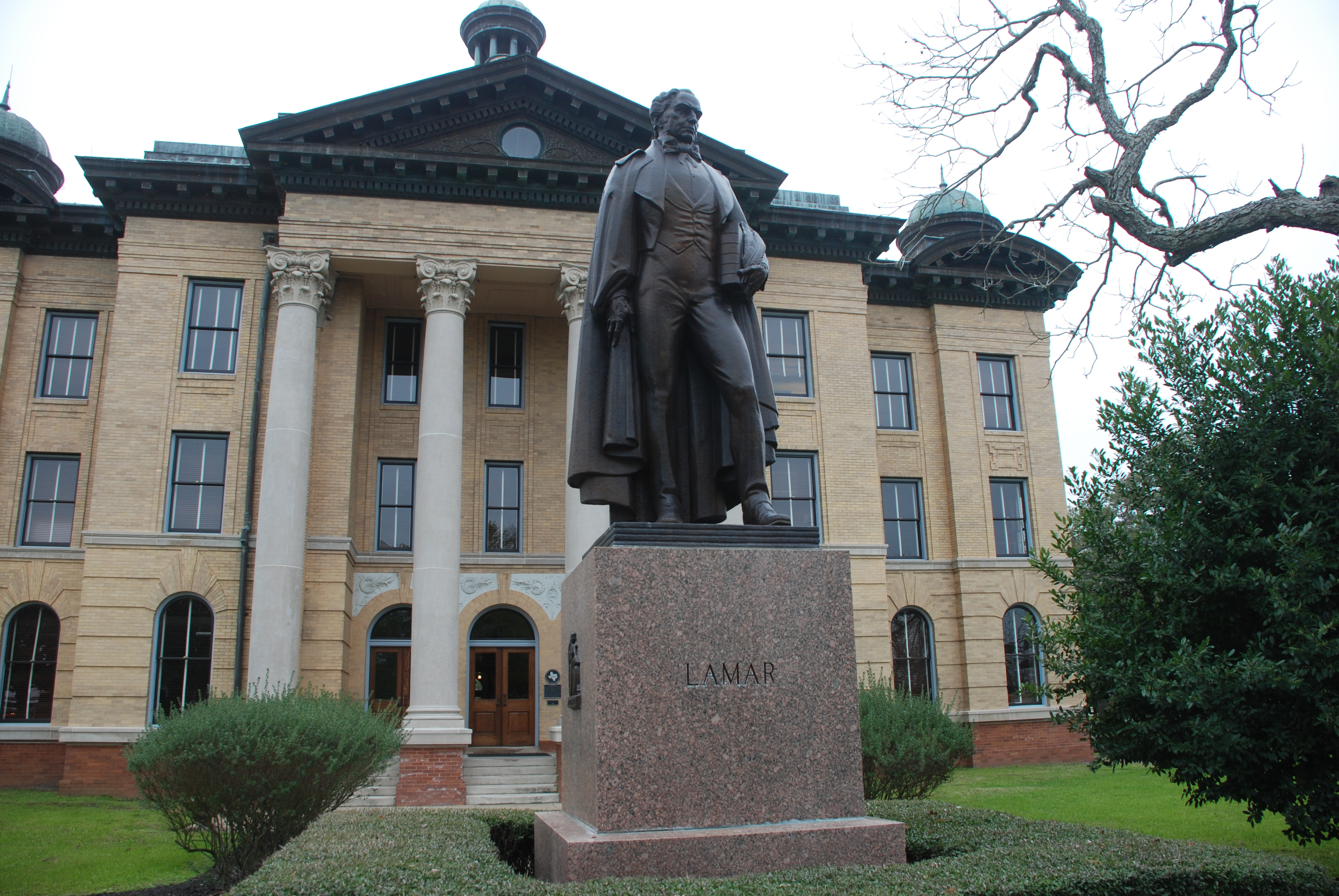
The Lamar Statue in front of the courthouse

A statue of Mirabeau B. Lamar, prominent politician of the Republic of Texas, sits in front of the courthouse. It particularly commemorates his advocacy for public state education. Lamar and his wife had both been residents of Richmond. As part of the Texas Centennial celebrations, the statue was dedicated on August 16, 1938, on the 140th anniversary of Lamar's birth. One of Lamar's great-granddaughters performed the unveiling.

== See also ==
- Jaybird–Woodpecker War
- List of county courthouses in Texas
- National Register of Historic Places in Fort Bend County, Texas
