= Four Corners, Texas =

- Census-designated place
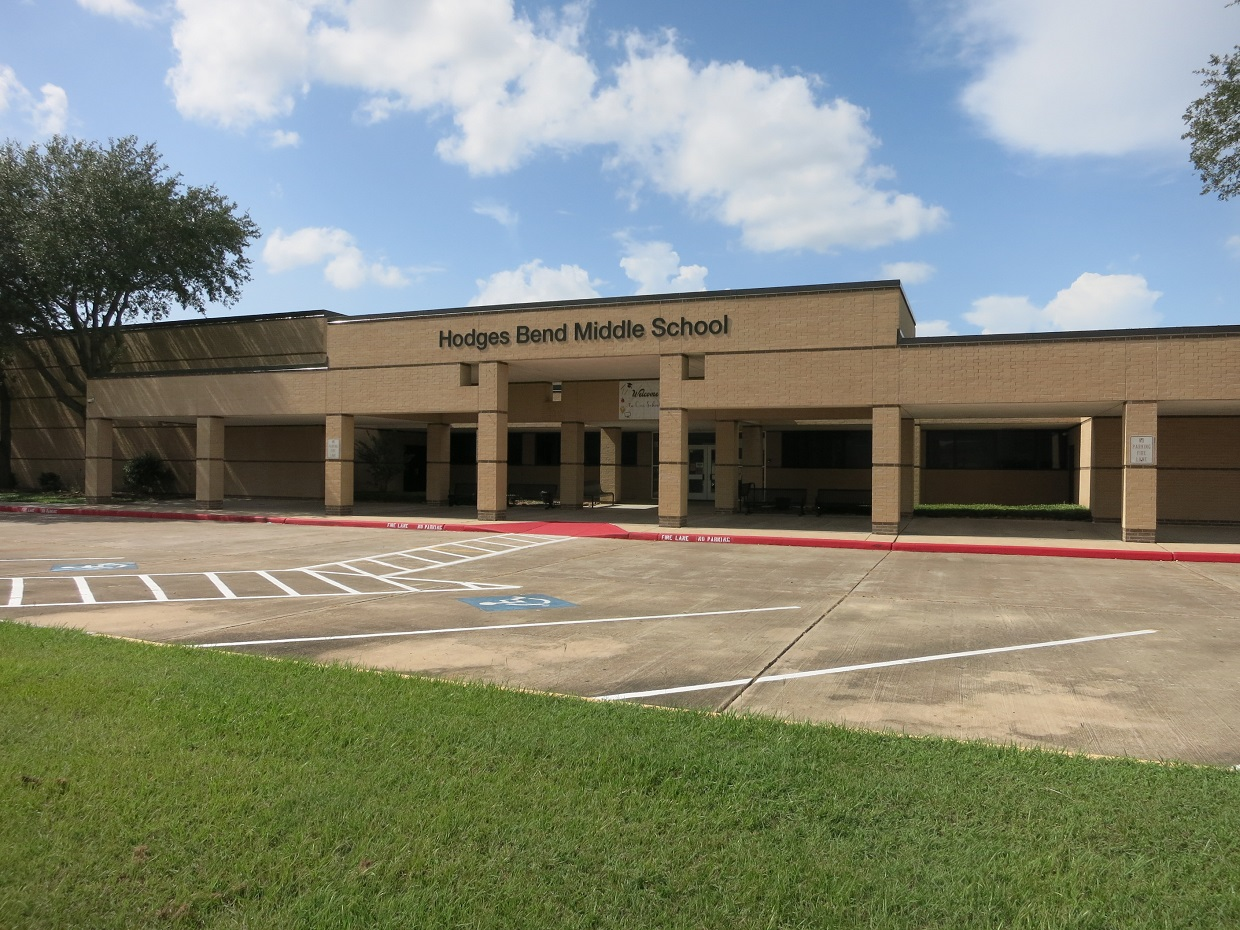
- Hodges Bend Middle School in Four Corners

- Coordinates: 29°40′10″N 95°39′33″W
- Country: United States
- State: Texas
- County: Fort Bend

Area
  - Total: 2.54 sq mi (6.59 km^{2})
  - Land: 2.54 sq mi (6.58 km^{2})
  - Water: 0.0039 sq mi (0.01 km^{2})
- Elevation: 94 ft (29 m)

Population (2020)
  - Total: 12,103
  - Density: 4,872/sq mi (1,881.1/km^{2})
- Time zone: UTC-6 (Central (CST))
  - Summer (DST): UTC-5 (CDT)
- FIPS code: 48-27102
- GNIS feature ID: 1357628

Four Corners is a census-designated place (CDP) within the extraterritorial jurisdiction of Houston in Fort Bend County, Texas, United States. The population was 12,103 at the 2020 census, up from 2,954 at the 2000 census.

== History ==
Four Corners began as a community of extended families. By 2011 it had become a rapidly suburbanizing area.

== Geography ==
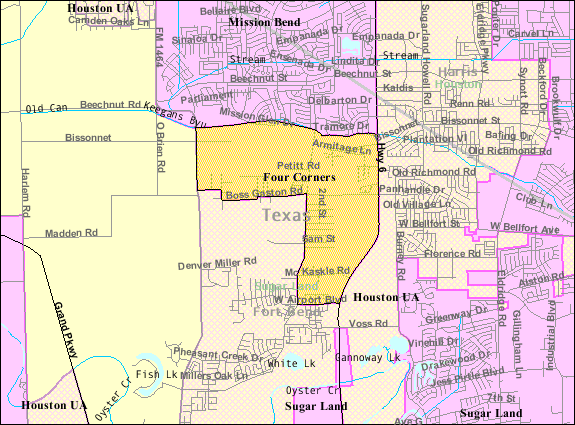
Map of Four Corners

Four Corners is located near the northeastern border of Fort Bend County at 29°40′10″N 95°39′33″W (29.669366, -95.659147). It is bordered to the north by the Mission Bend CDP and to the east, south, and west by small units of the city of Houston.

According to the United States Census Bureau, the CDP has a total area of 2.5 square miles (6.6 km^{2}), of which 0.004 square miles (0.01 km^{2}), or 0.12%, is water.

The original community was centered on the four-way intersection of Boss Gaston, Old Richmond, and Richmond Gaines roads. The census-designated place as of 2011 includes the crossroads and several new houses west of Texas State Highway 6, north of McKaskle Road, and south of Riverside Grove Drive and Stanbridge Drive. Journalist Jeannie Kever said that the community, once "isolated", had become "something bigger and harder to define, its aging small frame houses and mobile homes engulfed by the omnivorous spoils of growth."

Carmen Martinez, the president of the Fort Bend Freshwater Supply District No. 2 and a Four Corners resident who lived there since 1966, said in a Houston Chronicle article that at one time residents had to go to Houston or Rosenberg to get groceries. As of 2011 residents can go to local area stores to shop.

== Demographics ==
Historical population
Census	Pop.	Note	%±
2000	2,954		—
2010	12,382		319.2%
2020	12,103		−2.3%
U.S. Decennial Census; 1850–1900 1910; 1920 1930 1940; 1950 1960 1970; 1980 1990 2000; 2010

Four Corners first appeared as a census designated place in the 2000 U.S. census.

=== Racial and ethnic composition ===
Four Corners CDP, Texas – Racial and ethnic composition Note: the US Census treats Hispanic/Latino as an ethnic category. This table excludes Latinos from the racial categories and assigns them to a separate category. Hispanics/Latinos may be of any race.
Race / Ethnicity (NH = Non-Hispanic)	Pop 2000	Pop 2010	Pop 2020	% 2000	% 2010	% 2020
White alone (NH)	665	846	877	22.51%	6.83%	7.25%
Black or African American alone (NH)	543	3,794	3,571	18.38%	30.64%	29.51%
Native American or Alaska Native alone (NH)	1	21	28	0.03%	0.17%	0.23%
Asian alone (NH)	471	4,277	4,024	15.94%	34.54%	33.25%
Native Hawaiian or Pacific Islander alone (NH)	1	2	1	0.03%	0.02%	0.01%
Other race alone (NH)	0	42	64	0.00%	0.34%	0.53%
Mixed race or Multiracial (NH)	57	255	174	1.93%	2.06%	1.44%
Hispanic or Latino (any race)	1,216	3,145	3,364	41.16%	25.40%	27.79%
Total	2,954	12,382	12,103	100.00%	100.00%	100.00%

=== 2020 census ===
As of the 2020 census, Four Corners had a population of 12,103. There were 3,363 households and 2,908 families in the CDP. The median age was 35.7 years; 25.4% of residents were under the age of 18, and 10.7% were 65 years of age or older. For every 100 females, there were 92.4 males, and for every 100 females age 18 and over, there were 90.1 males age 18 and over.

In the 2020 census, 100.0% of residents lived in urban areas and 0.0% lived in rural areas.

Of the 3,363 households, 45.5% had children under the age of 18 living in them. Of all households, 60.6% were married-couple households, 11.2% were households with a male householder and no spouse or partner present, and 24.5% were households with a female householder and no spouse or partner present. About 11.6% of all households were made up of individuals, and 3.9% had someone living alone who was 65 years of age or older.

There were 3,481 housing units, of which 3.4% were vacant. The homeowner vacancy rate was 0.7% and the rental vacancy rate was 6.4%.

=== 2010 census ===
From the 2000 census to the 2010 census, the population increased to 12,382, about four times the population in 2000. As of 2011 90% of the residents are Asian Americans, African-Americans, and Latino Americans. Between the 2000 and 2010 censuses, the number of White Americans increased while the percentage of Whites decreased. Jeannie Kever of the Houston Chronicle said that "not all of the newcomers identify with the old neighborhood and its inhabitants, even those living just a block away."

Karl Eschbach, a former demographer for the state of Texas, said that many people moved from Houston neighborhoods and communities with distinct racial and socioeconomic identities, like the East End, Sunnyside, and the Third Ward, to areas too new to have racial identities. Eschbach explained that "as a large minority middle class started to emerge, Fort Bend was virgin territory that all groups could move to." When explaining why many of the new residents were of minority groups rather than white Americans, Eschbach added, "Many minorities are looking for mixed communities, where whites might feel it's more optimal to live in a subdivision that's more homogeneous with their own group."

Kever said that in previous eras, "Four Corners has always been a multicultural mashup, its residents united by poverty and an appreciation for life in the slow lane." By 2011 many newer residents were wealthier than the original residents.

=== 2000 census ===
As of the census of 2000, there were 2,954 people, 775 households, and 702 families residing in the CDP. The population density was 1,038.2 inhabitants per square mile (400.9/km^{2}). There were 824 housing units at an average density of 289.6 per square mile (111.8/km^{2}). The racial makeup of the CDP was 42.76% White, 18.96% African American, 0.64% Native American, 15.94% Asian, 0.03% Pacific Islander, 18.82% from other races, and 2.84% from two or more races. Hispanic or Latino of any race were 41.16% of the population.

There were 775 households, out of which 57.4% had children under the age of 18 living with them, 74.3% were married couples living together, 10.2% had a female householder with no husband present, and 9.4% were non-families. 7.2% of all households were made up of individuals, and 2.7% had someone living alone who was 65 years of age or older. The average household size was 3.81 and the average family size was 4.02.

In the CDP, the population was spread out, with 36.7% under the age of 18, 10.0% from 18 to 24, 29.1% from 25 to 44, 19.3% from 45 to 64, and 4.8% who were 65 years of age or older. The median age was 28 years. For every 100 females, there were 100.0 males. For every 100 females age 18 and over, there were 97.8 males.

The median income for a household in the CDP was $63,534, and the median income for a family was $65,200. Males had a median income of $34,821 versus $40,272 for females. The per capita income for the CDP was $19,826. About 12.1% of families and 16.3% of the population were below the poverty line, including 23.4% of those under age 18 and 15.0% of those age 65 or over.

== Government and infrastructure ==
As of 2011 the original section of Four Corners is serviced by a water system of the Fort Bend Freshwater Supply District No. 2 and individual septic systems. Newer areas have municipal utility districts, which provide sewer and water services.

Originally residents of the original section used individual water wells. Several years prior to 2011, residents of the original section formed the Fort Bend Freshwater Supply District No. 2 and built a water system. Residents still use individual septic systems. According to Carmen Martinez, the president of the supply district, work on a sewer system will start at a later point in 2011.

== Education ==
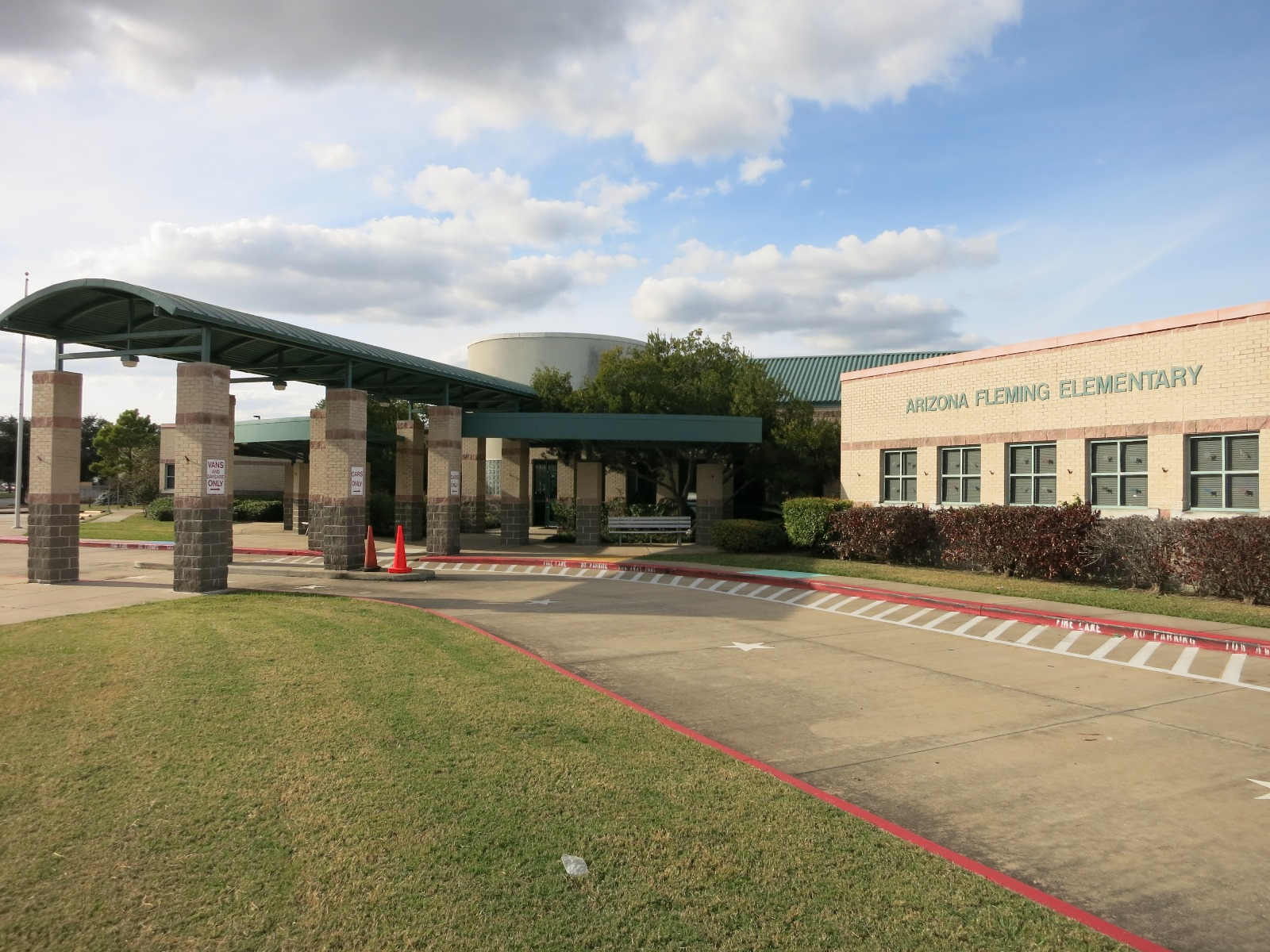
Arizona Fleming Elementary School

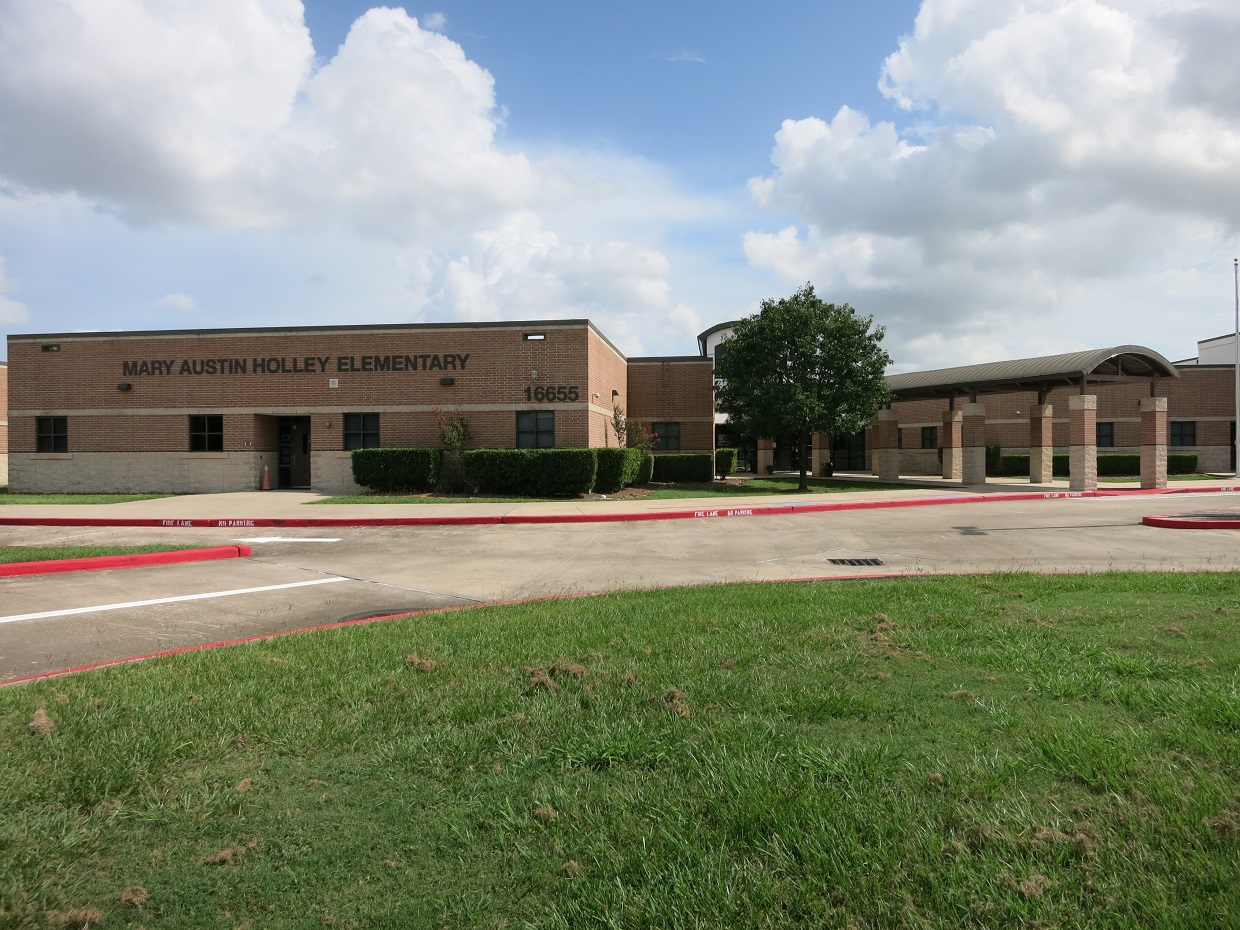
Mary Austin Holley Elementary School

Four Corners is within the Fort Bend Independent School District.

Elementary schools serving the Four Corners CDP and within the Four Corners CDP include Arizona Fleming Elementary and Mary Austin Holley Elementary. Elementary schools outside of the CDP serving sections of Four Corners include Drabek and Oyster Creek. Hodges Bend Middle School, located in the CDP, serves most of Four Corners, while Garcia Middle School and Sugar Land Middle School, both outside of the CDP, serves a small portion of the area. Austin High School, George Bush High School, and Kempner High School, all outside of the CDP, serve sections of Four Corners.

In previous eras, Four Corners residents attended Travis High School in Pecan Grove and Dulles High School in Sugar Land.

The Texas Legislature specifies that the Houston Community College (HCC) boundary includes "the part of the Fort Bend Independent School District that is not located in the service area of the Wharton County Junior College District and that is adjacent to the Houston Community College System District." Wharton College's boundary within FBISD is defined only as the City of Sugar Land and the ETJ of Sugar Land, and Four Corners is not in the Sugar Land ETJ (it is in the Houston ETJ). Four Corners is in HCC.

== Parks and recreation ==
Fort Bend County operates the Four Corners Recreation Center in Four Corners. The park includes a community center, two pavilions, playground equipment, a regulation soccer and softball field, 1/2 mile walking track, and a volleyball court.
