= B. Ray and Charlotte Woods House =

Historic house in Texas, United States

- U.S. National Register of Historic Places
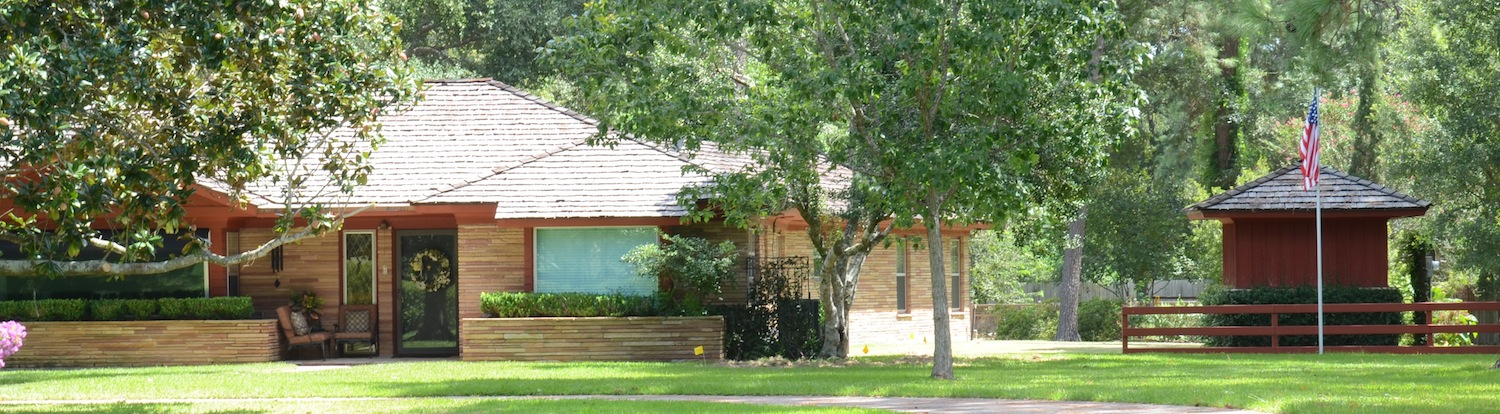
- B. Ray and Charlotte Woods House in 2012

- Location within Texas Location within the United States
- Location: 610 Woods Ln., Katy, Texas
- Coordinates: 29°46′59″N 95°49′38″W
- Area: 2 acres (0.81 ha)
- Built: 1951
- Architect: Wylie W. Vale
- Architectural style: Modern Movement, Ranch Style
- NRHP reference No.: 03001377
- Added to NRHP: January 6, 2004

The B. Ray and Charlotte Woods House is a historic house in Katy, Texas, U.S.. It was built in 1951 for Ray Woods, the owner of a lumberyard. It was designed in the ranch-style architectural style by Wylie W. Vale. It has been listed on the National Register of Historic Places since January 6, 2004. In 2007, it was owned by Hill Adams, who served on Katy's city council.

The house was severely damaged by Hurricane Harvey floods in August 2017. The house was demolished in 2020.

== See also ==
- National Register of Historic Places listings in Fort Bend County, Texas
