= National Register of Historic Places listings in Fort Bend County, Texas =

Location of Fort Bend County in Texas

This is a list of the National Register of Historic Places listings in Fort Bend County, Texas.

This is intended to be a complete list of properties and districts listed on the National Register of Historic Places in Fort Bend County, Texas. There are one district and eight individual properties listed on the National Register in the county. Three of the individually listed properties are Recorded Texas Historic Landmarks including one that is also a State Antiquities Landmark.

This National Park Service list is complete through NPS recent listings posted July 17, 2026.

== Current listings ==
The locations of National Register properties and districts may be seen in a mapping service provided.

	Name on the Register	Image	Date listed	Location	City or town	Description
1	Fort Bend County Courthouse	Fort Bend County Courthouse	March 13, 1980 (#80004119)	400 Jackson St. 29°34′54″N 95°45′42″W	Richmond	State Antiquities Landmark, Recorded Texas Historic Landmark
2	Henry G. and Annie B. Green House	Henry G. and Annie B. Green House	September 18, 1996 (#96001016)	.5 mi SE of old US 59 and TX 118; 29°26′59″N 95°59′38″W	Kendleton	Demolished in 2018.
3	Holy Rosary Catholic Church		July 8, 2022 (#100007913)	1416 George St. 29°33′12″N 95°48′59″W	Rosenberg	
4	Imperial Sugar Company Refinery Historic District	Imperial Sugar Company Refinery Historic District	June 26, 2017 (#100001253)	198 Kempner St. 29°37′15″N 95°38′11″W	Sugar Land	
5	Lamar-Calder House	Lamar-Calder House	March 30, 2005 (#05000244)	915 Front St. 29°34′40″N 95°45′23″W	Richmond	
6	Methodist Church of Richmond	Methodist Church of Richmond	June 13, 2014 (#14000339)	400 Jackson Street; 29°34′56″N 95°45′42″W	Richmond	Recorded Texas Historic Landmark
7	John M. and Lottie D. Moore House	John M. and Lottie D. Moore House	December 9, 2001 (#01000104)	406 S. Fifth St. 29°34′51″N 95°45′44″W	Richmond	Recorded Texas Historic Landmark
8	Patricia Welder and Hampton C. Robinson Jr. House		July 22, 2026 (#100013256)	3630 Hampton Drive; 29°34′08″N 95°33′08″W	Missouri City	
9	B. Ray and Charlotte Woods House	B. Ray and Charlotte Woods House	January 6, 2004 (#03001377)	610 Woods Ln. 29°47′00″N 95°49′39″W	Katy	

== See also ==
- National Register of Historic Places listings in Texas
- Recorded Texas Historic Landmarks in Fort Bend County
