= John M. and Lottie D. Moore House =

Historic house in Texas, United States

- U.S. National Register of Historic Places
- Recorded Texas Historic Landmark
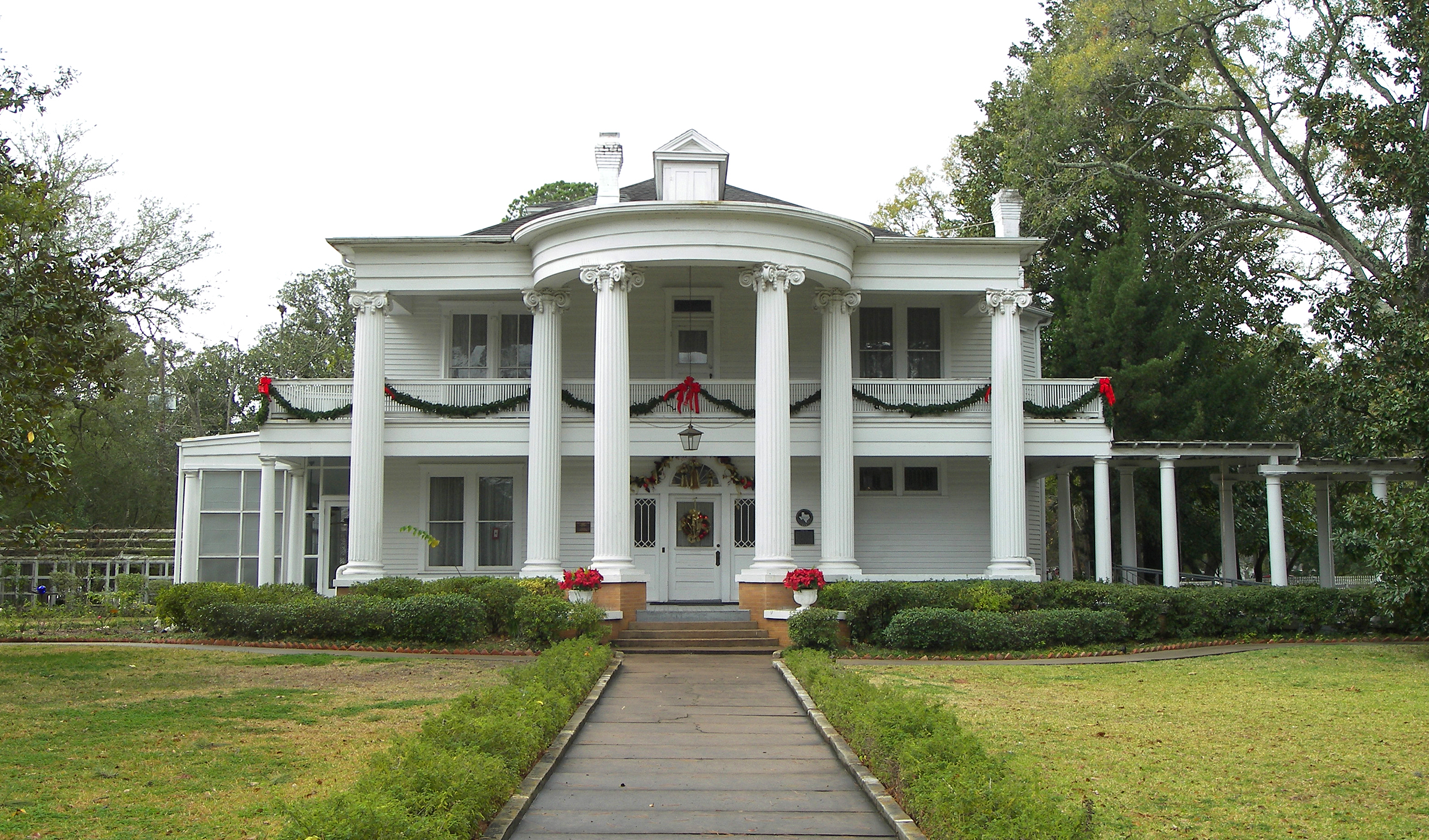
- Moore House in 2008

- Location within Texas Location within the United States
- Interactive map showing the location of John M. and Lottie D. Moore House
- Location: 406 S. Fifth St., Richmond, Texas
- Coordinates: 29°34′51″N 95°45′39″W
- Area: less than one acre
- Built: 1883
- Architect: Thomas Culshaw, C.H. Page and Brothers
- Architectural style: Classical Revival
- NRHP reference No.: 01000104
- RTHL No.: 9011

Significant dates
- Added to NRHP: December 9, 2001
- Designated RTHL: 1962

The John M. and Lottie D. Moore House is at 406 S. Fifth Street, in Richmond, Texas, United States. It is currently part of the Fort Bend Museum complex. It was added to the National Register of Historic Places listings in Fort Bend County, Texas in 2001, and became a Recorded Texas Historic Landmark in 1962.

== John and Lottie house ==
The home was built by John Matthew Moore (1862–1940) and his wife Lottie Dyer Moore (1865–1924) in 1883, the year they married. John Moore served in both the Texas House of Representatives and the United States House of Representatives. Lottie's father J. Foster Dyer, who died a year before the wedding, was a wealthy rancher in Fort Bend County. Her maternal grandmother Nancy Gray Spencer Barnett was among the original colonists who came to Texas with Stephen F. Austin. In 1824, Austin granted Barnett land in Fort Bend County. Lottie inherited acreage from the original grant her grandmother received. From her grandfather Thomas Barnett, Lottie inherited the cattle on the ranch.

The house was designed in 1883 by Thomas Culshaw, as a four-bedroom, two-story Victorian mansion with a center tower and cupola. The First Baptist Church of Richmond was founded in the Moore house, which served as its original meeting location. In 1889, the church moved to its own building. C.H. Page and Brothers of Austin designed the 1905 Classical Revival remodel of the house and connecting property. It was during this remodel that the heating system of the house was converted to seven coal-burning fireplaces. The front facade was remodeled in the Classic Revival porch and columns which now exist on the house. Interior improvements included new hardwood flooring, room expansions, front entry stairway, and a dining room remodel. The grape arbor and gazebo were constructed during this period.

== Present day ==
The house was passed down through successive heirs until 1975, when the last family member died. The house and property was then deeded over to the Fort Bend History Association (formerly the Fort Bend County Museum Association) and is currently a part of the Fort Bend Museum complex. The association has upgraded the home to bring it up to code in accordance with state and local requirements.

== See also ==
- National Register of Historic Places listings in Fort Bend County, Texas
- Recorded Texas Historic Landmarks in Fort Bend, County
