= Lamar–Calder House =

Historic house in Texas, United States

- U.S. National Register of Historic Places
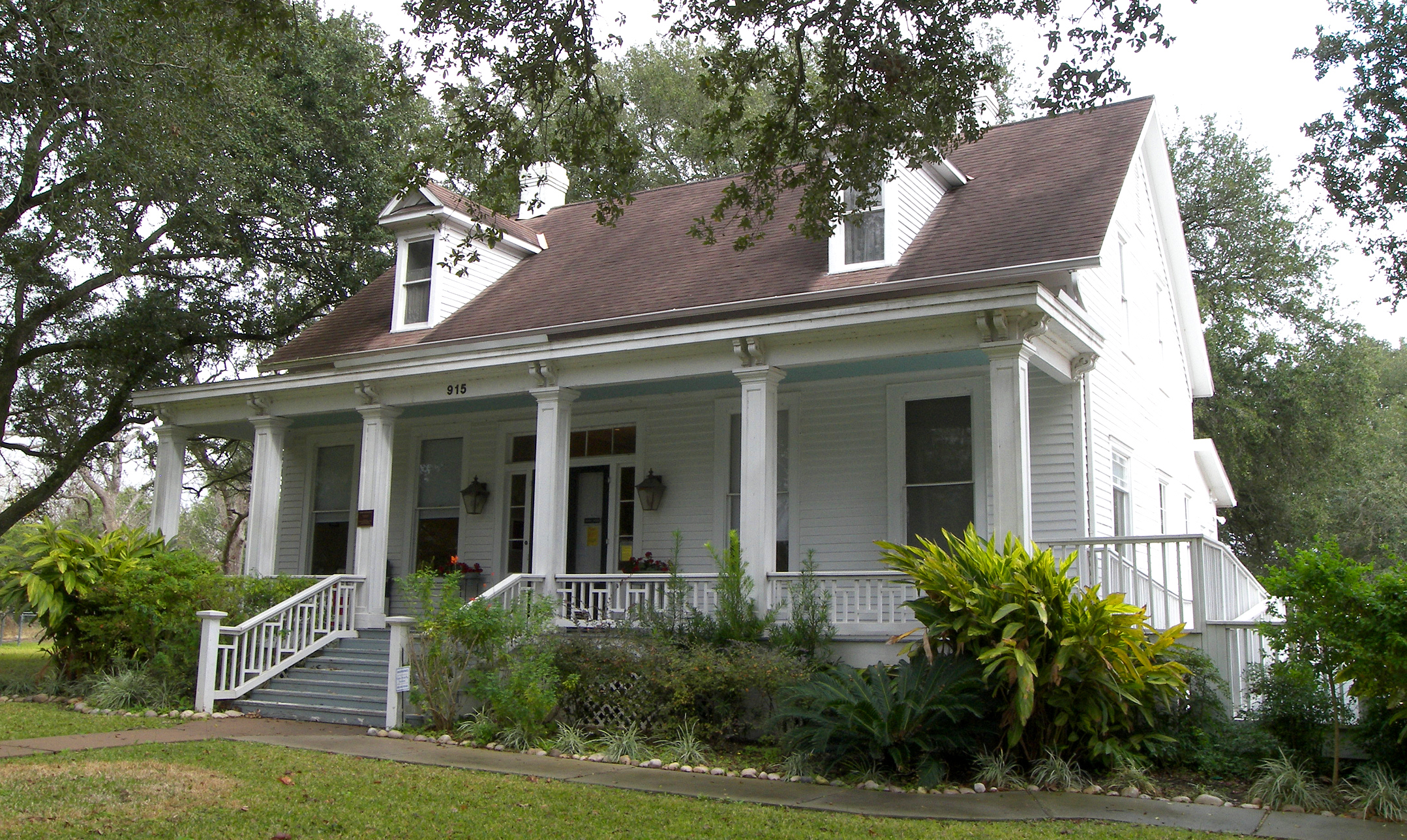
- Lamar–Calder House in 2008

- Location within Texas Location within the United States
- Location: 915 Front St., Richmond, Texas
- Coordinates: 29°34′48″N 95°45′25″W
- Area: 6.6 acres (2.7 ha)
- Built: 1860
- Architectural style: Greek Revival
- NRHP reference No.: 05000244
- Added to NRHP: March 30, 2005

The Lamar–Calder House is a historic house, on the former Lamar Plantation in Richmond, Texas.

== History ==
The land originally belonged to Jane Herbert Wilkinson Long, until it was passed on to Mirabeau B. Lamar, who built the Lamar Plantation. Lamar lived in another house which was later destroyed.

A new house was built in 1859–1861. It was designed in the Greek Revival architectural style. Lamar never lived in the house, as it was completed after his death, but his widow Henrietta Maffitt did. Their daughter Loretto Evalina and her husband, S. D. Calder, the son of public official Robert J. Calder, lived in the house with their four children until they sold it in 1900. The house was owned by the Hendee family from 1908 to 1996. It later belonged to Felix Tijerina's son.

The house has been listed on the National Register of Historic Places since March 30, 2005.

== See also ==
- National Register of Historic Places listings in Fort Bend County, Texas
