= Charles Henry Page =

American architect

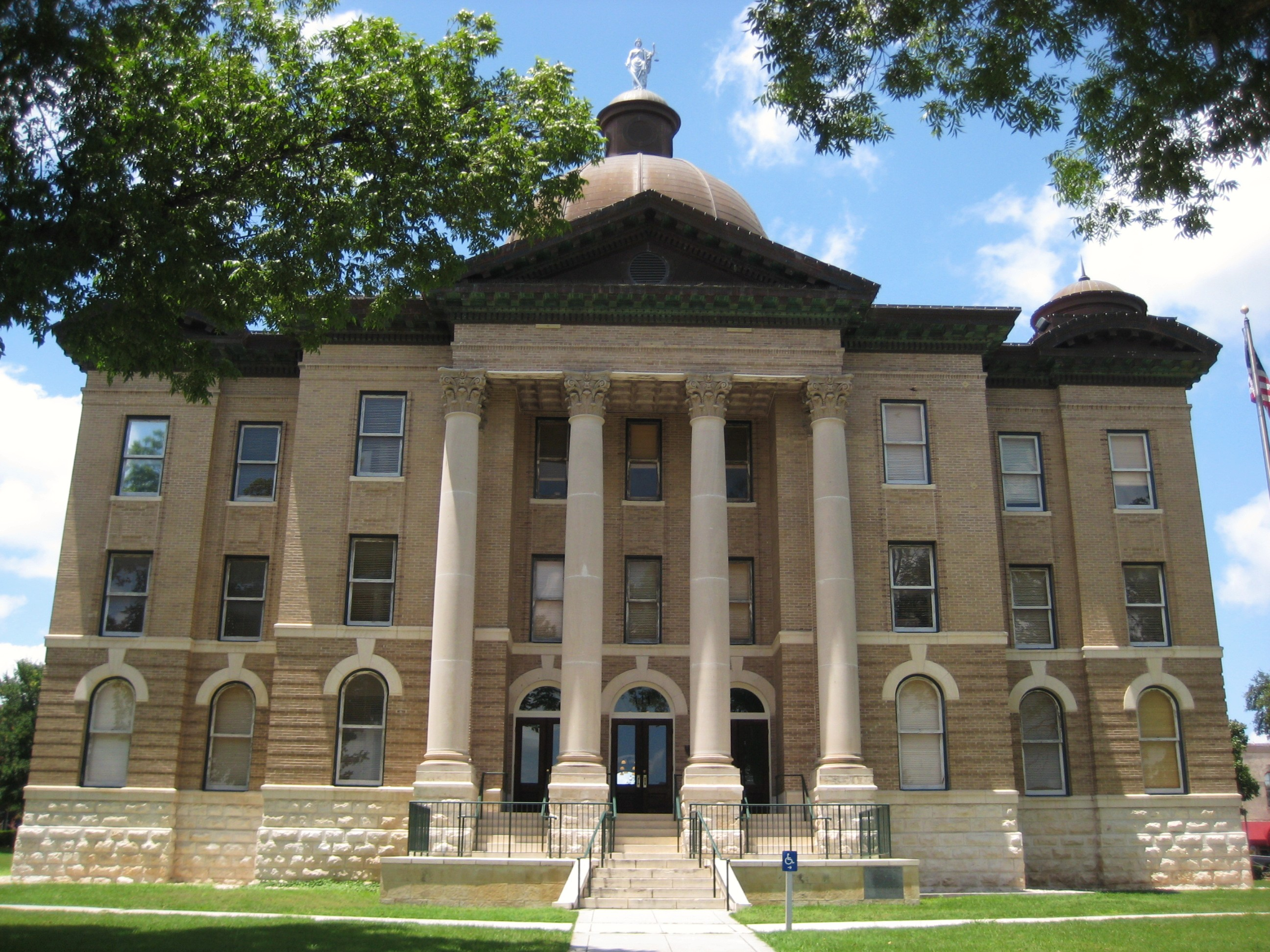
Hays County Courthouse

Charles Henry Page (1876–1957) was an American architect. He and his brother Louis Charles Page (1883–1934) founded the Texas firm of Page Brothers, Architects (also known as C. H. Page & Bro.). The firm achieved great recognition when they were commissioned to design the Texas State Building for the 1904 Louisiana Purchase Exposition (informally known as the St. Louis World's Fair). The Pages also designed many courthouses and other buildings across Texas.

== Early life and career ==
Page was the son of an English immigrant stonemason. Page was born in St. Louis, Missouri. His family moved to Texas when he was ten years old so his father could work on the Texas State Capitol. He attended public school and worked with his father in the construction industry.

Page apprenticed with several architects and then began his own practice at the age of 19 with the firm Makin and Page. Page left that firm and began an independent practice as C. H. Page Jr. His brother Louis soon joined him, and they formed Page Brothers, Architects in 1898. The firm became one of the leading firms specializing in public projects such as public schools and courthouses.

Page's son Charles Henry Page Jr. was born in 1910 in Austin. He received his bachelor's degree in architecture in 1932 from the University of Texas at Austin. After Louis's death in 1934, Page Jr. joined the practice. In 1936, he became a partner and the firm name was changed to C.H. Page & Son. After the death of Page Sr. (the father, though sometimes also referred to as C. H. Page Jr.) in 1957, Page Jr. continued to practice for several years.

Louis Charles Page also had a son, Louis Charles Page Jr. (1909–1981), who became an architect. He and college roommate Louis Southerland (1906–1994) formed Page and Southerland in 1935 in Austin. Page and Southerland designed many of the monuments placed around the state to commemorate the Texas Centennial. They were joined by Louis's brother George in 1939 and the name was expanded to Page Southerland Page. The company changed its name to just Page in 2013.

== Texas courthouses ==
The brothers designed numerous public buildings in Texas, including the Anderson, Chambers, Fort Bend, Hays, Hunt, Orange, and Williamson county courthouses.

== Other designs ==
Page also designed the 1936 Austin federal courthouse. and the station at Crowley, Louisiana, built in 1907 for the Colorado Southern, New Orleans and Pacific Railroad as well as the city hall buildings in Brownsville, Mexia and Eagle Lake. Many of Page's buildings have been added to the National Register of Historic Places.

== Personal ==
Page lived in the Pemberton Heights district of Austin. He died in 1957 and is buried at Oakwood Cemetery in Austin, the same cemetery he had designed a small chapel for in 1914.

== Gallery ==
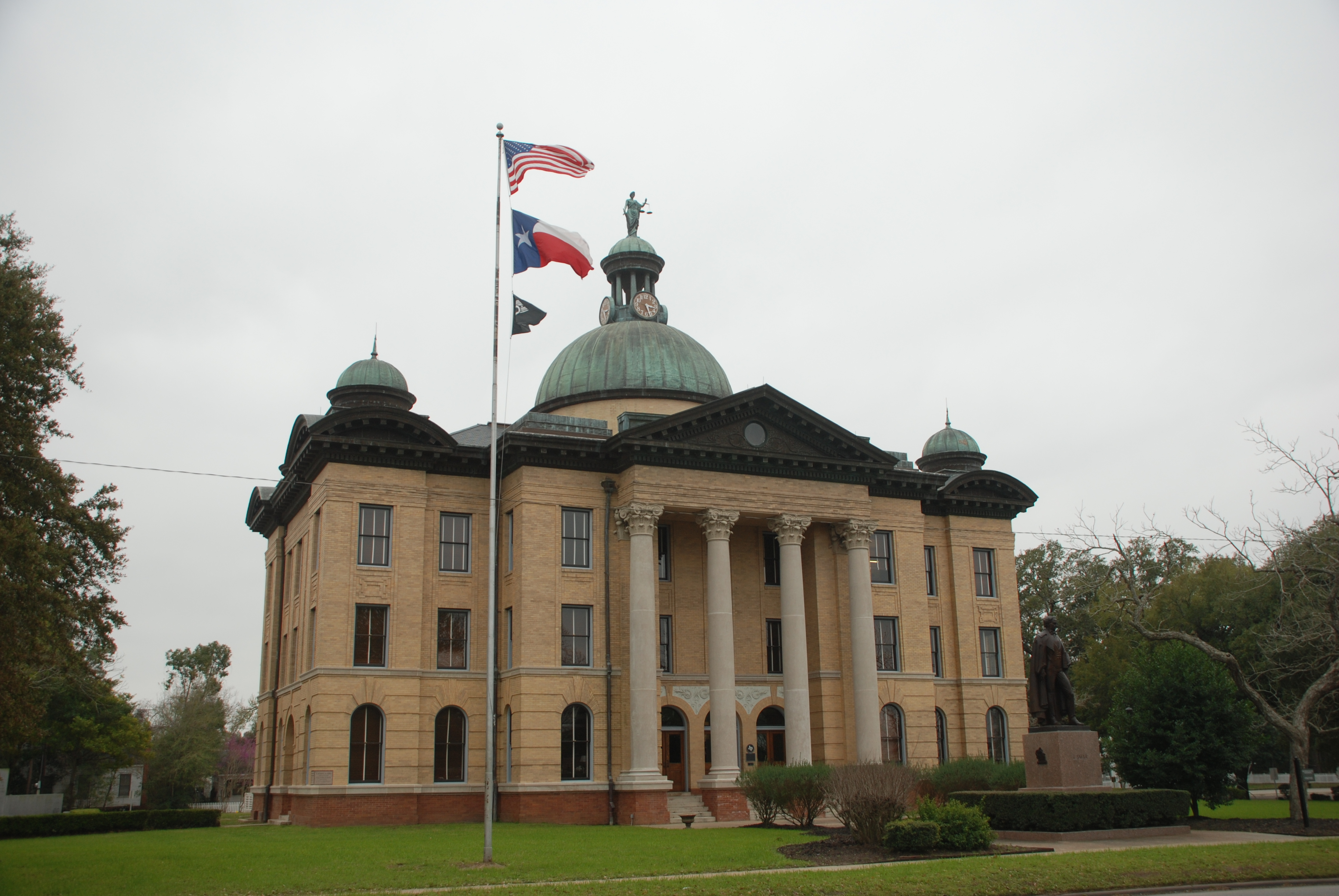
Fort Bend County Courthouse, Texas

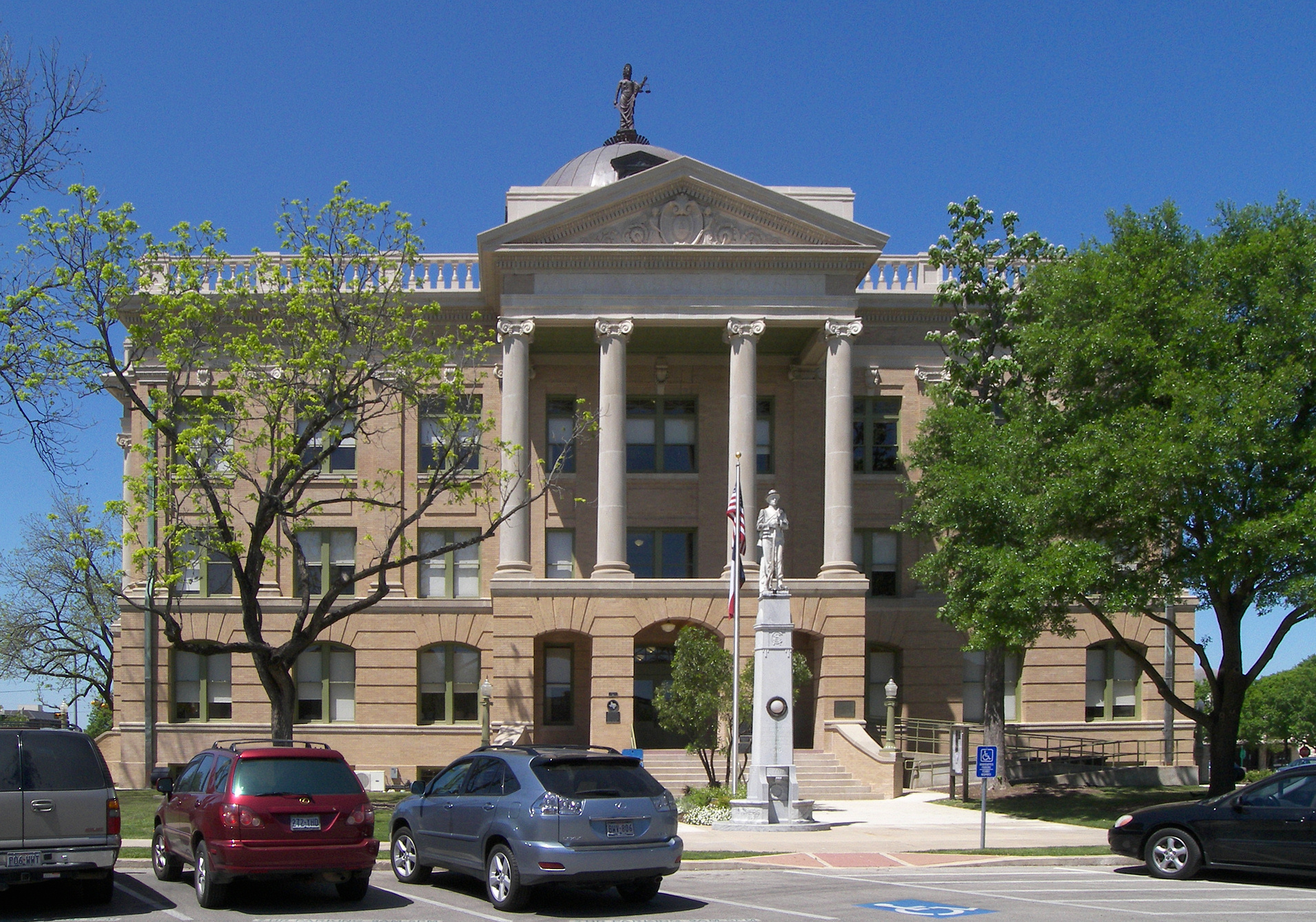
Williamson County Courthouse, Texas

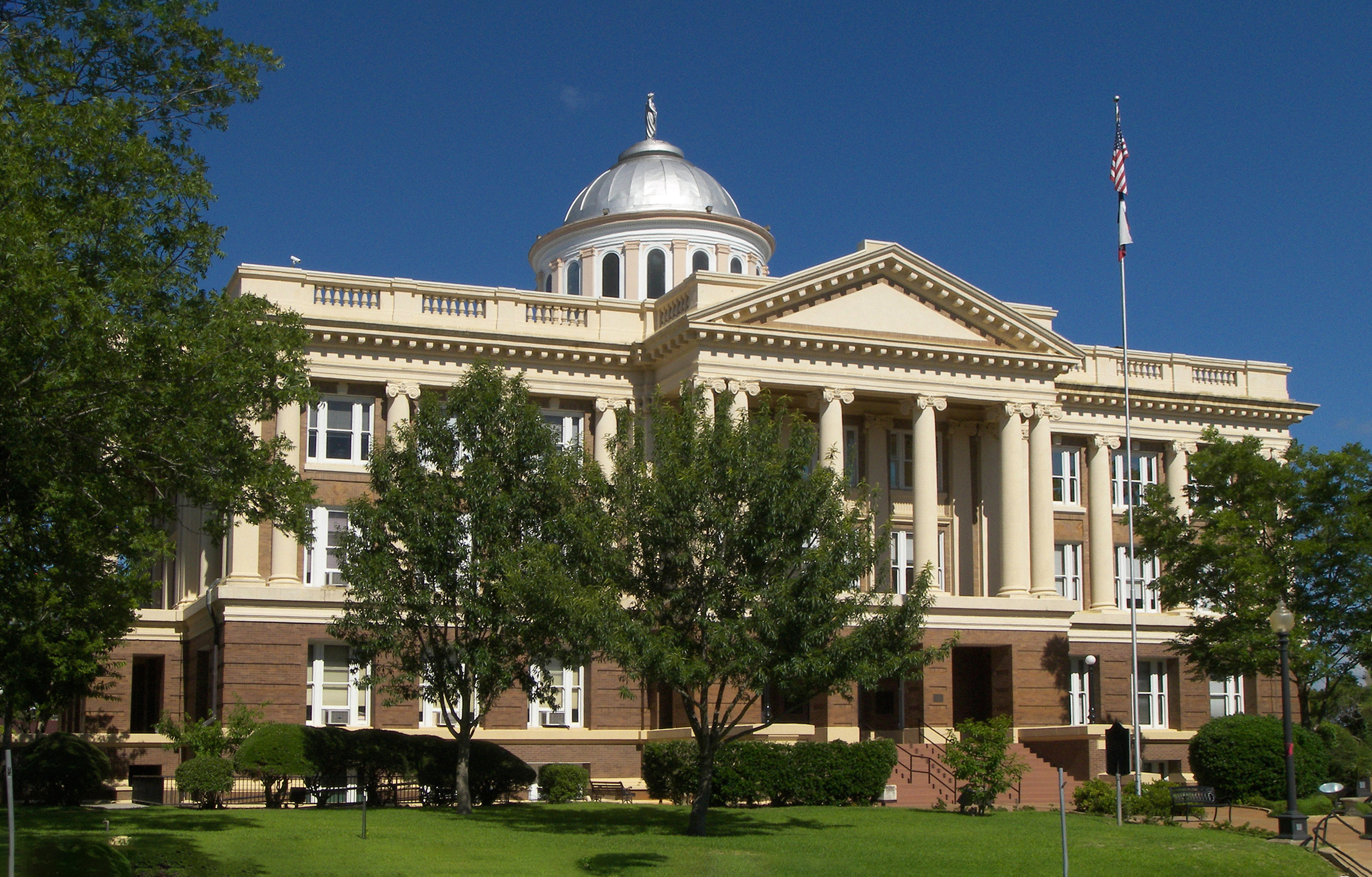
Anderson County Courthouse, Texas

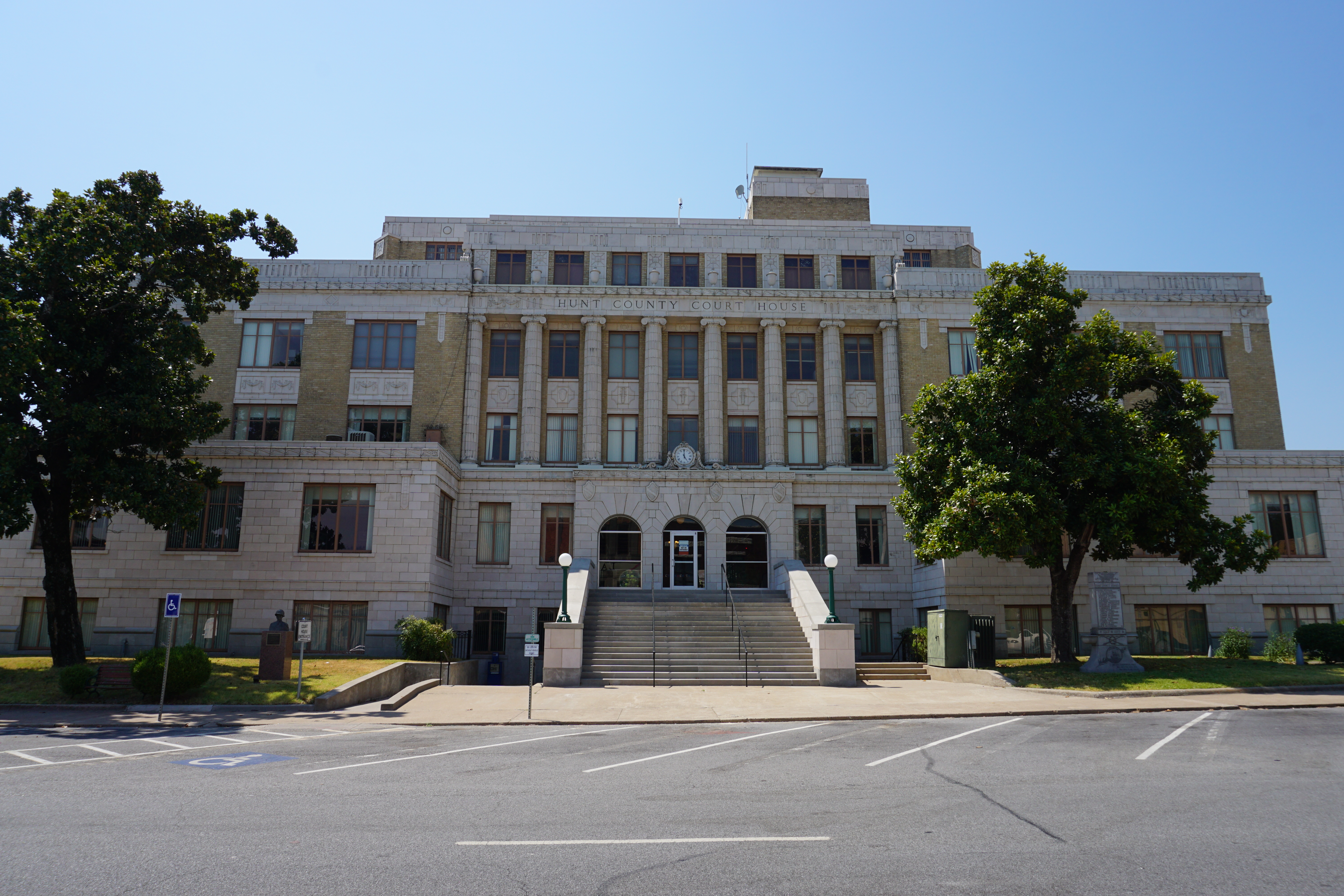
Hunt County Courthouse, Texas

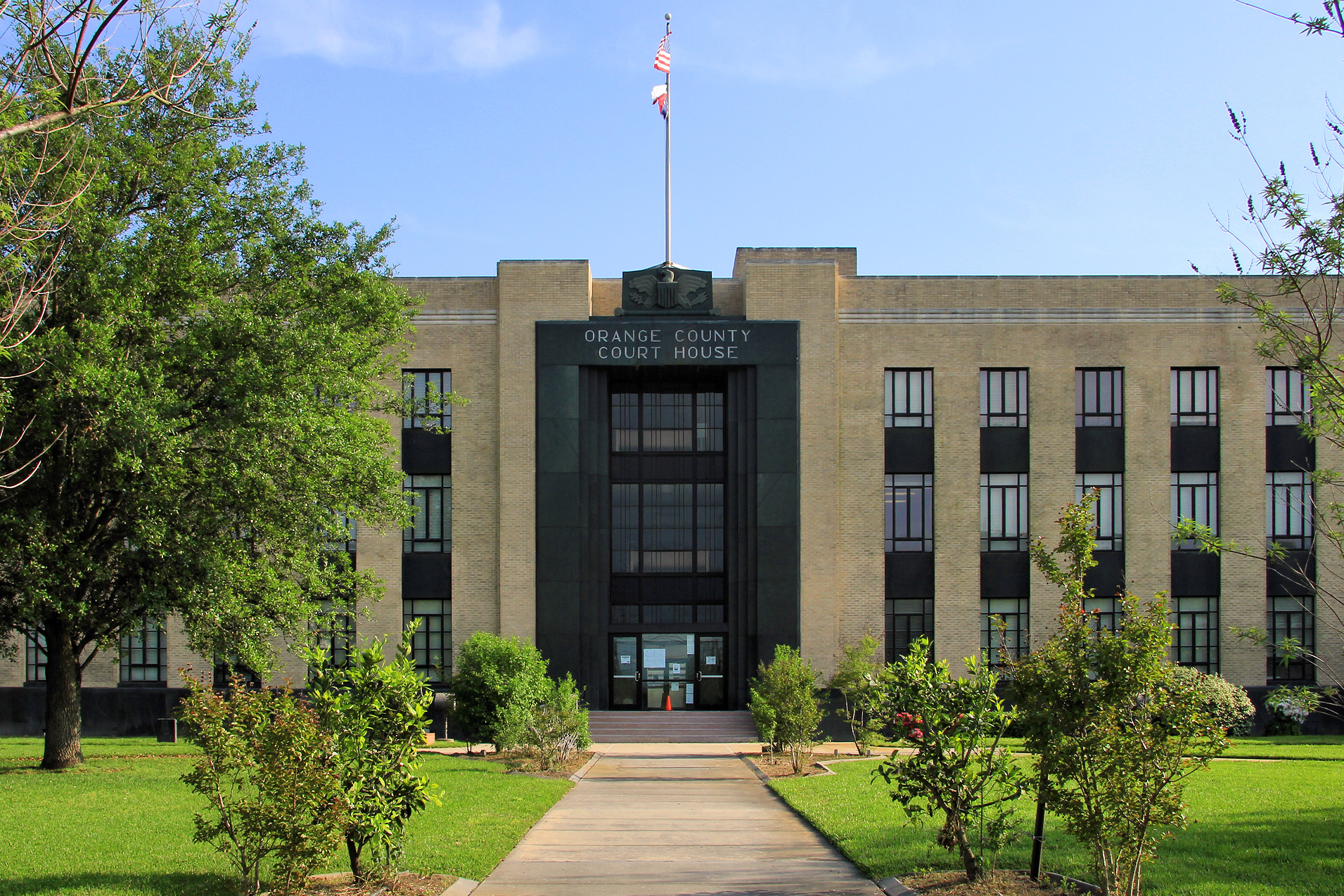
Orange County Courthouse, Texas

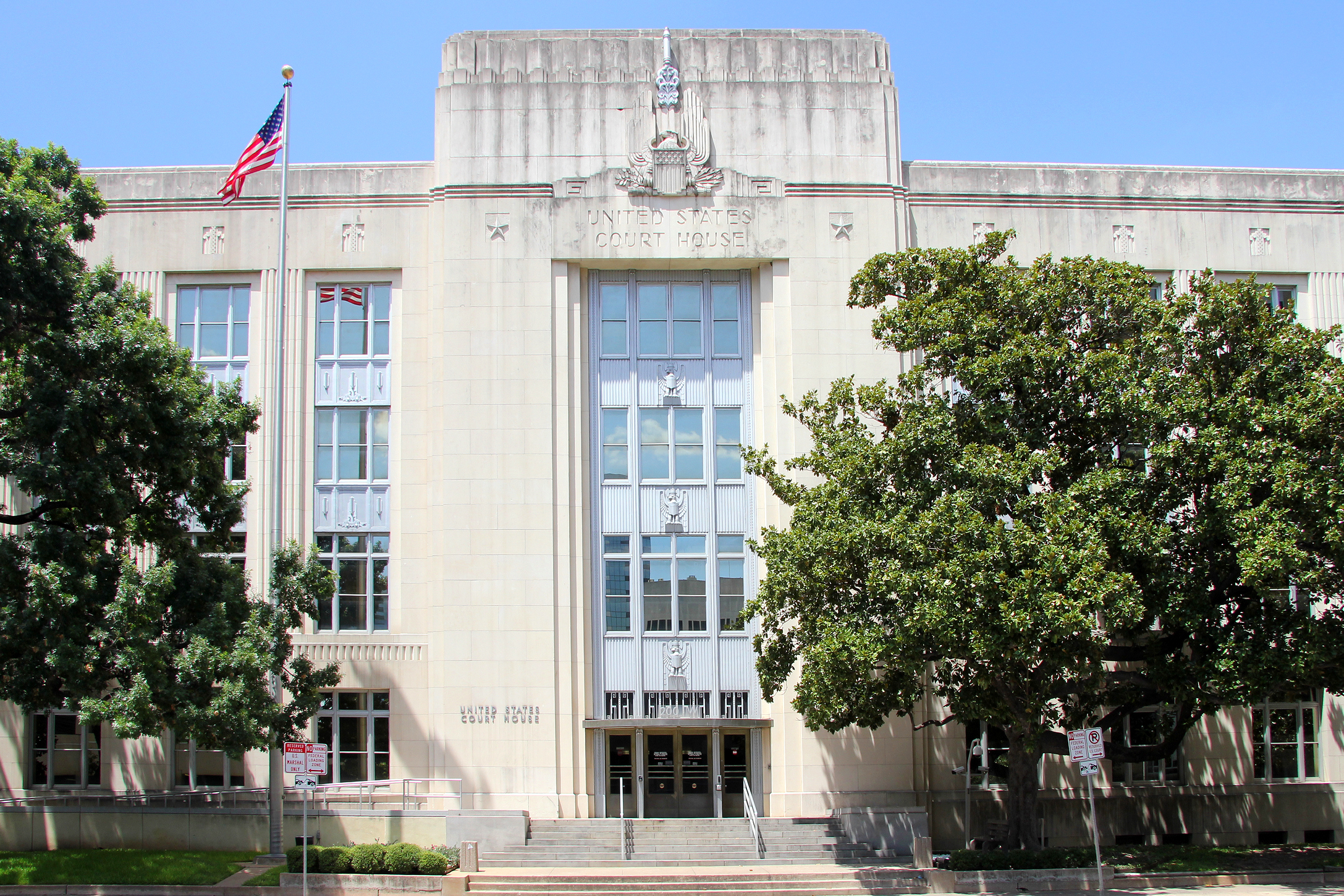
United States Courthouse, Austin, Texas

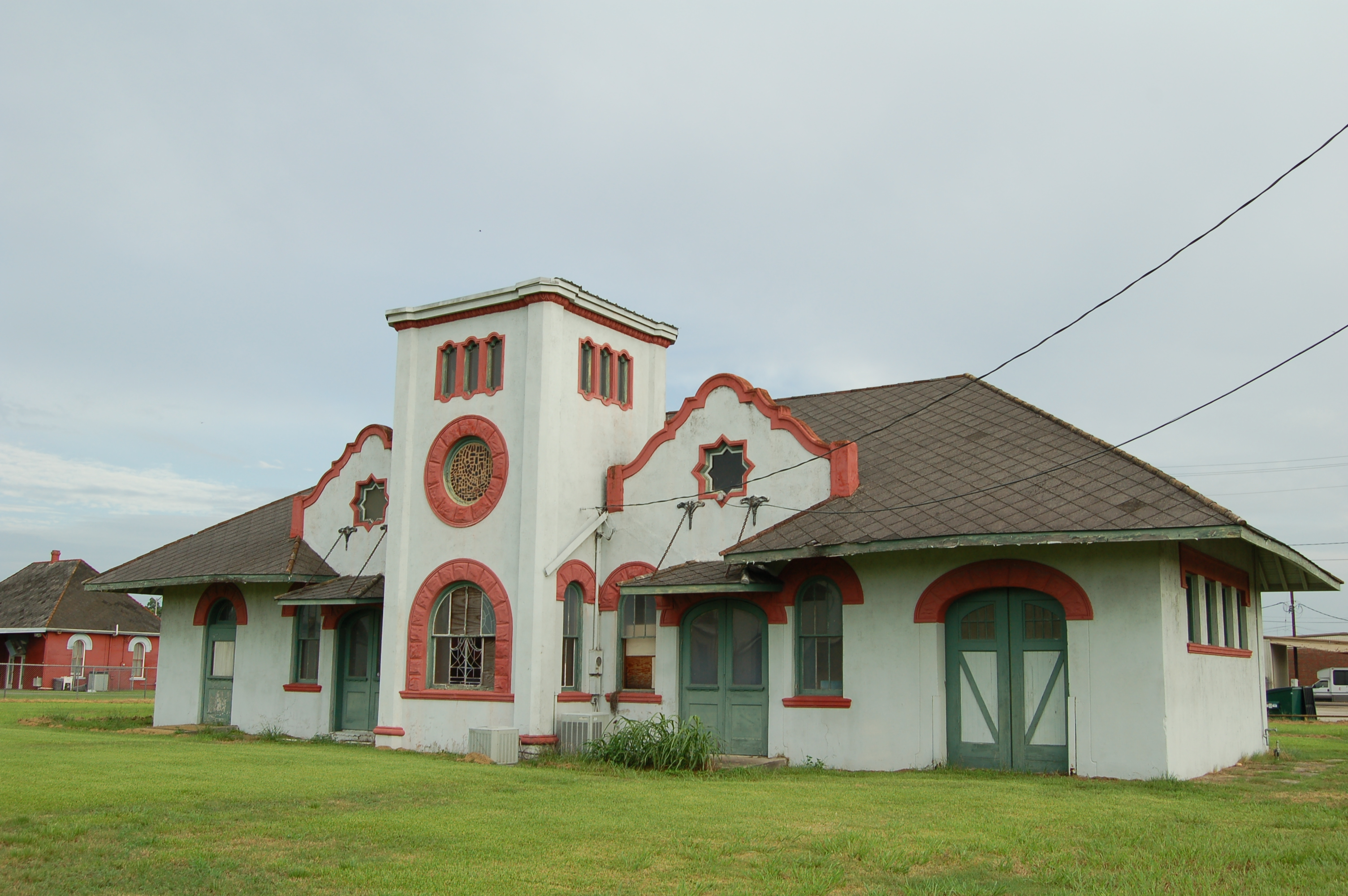
Railroad Depot, Crowley, Louisiana
