= Orange County Courthouse (Texas) =

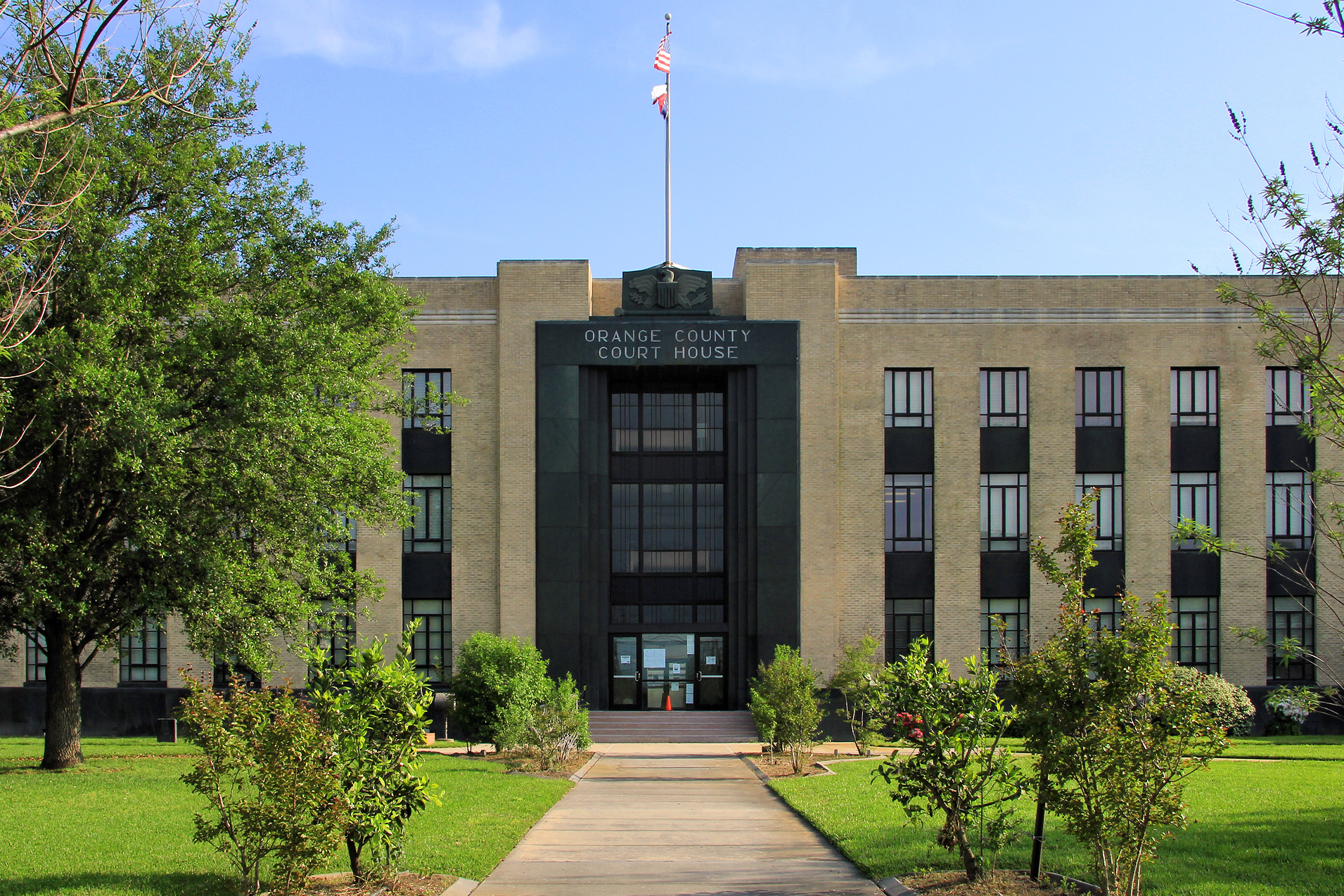
- Orange County Courthouse in 2015

- Location within Texas Orange County Courthouse (the United States)

General information
- Architectural style: Moderne
- Location: 801 W. Division Ave., Orange, Texas
- Coordinates: 30°05′24″N 93°44′12″W
- Completed: 1937
- Renovated: 1962

Technical details
- Material: Brick, limestone and marble
- Floor count: 3

Design and construction
- Architects: Charles Henry Page, Louis Charles Page
- Architecture firm: Page Brothers
- Main contractor: Falbo & Falbo

The Orange County Courthouse is located at 801 West Division Avenue, Orange, Texas, United States. The art deco courthouse was designed by Charles Henry Page of the firm C. H. Page and Brother of Austin, Texas and built in 1937 after a fire destroyed the Old Orange County Courthouse.

== See also ==
- List of county courthouses in Texas
