= Jaybird–Woodpecker War =

Political feud in 19th century Texas

- Date: 1888–89
- Location: Fort Bend County, Texas, United States
- Outcome: Jaybird victory
- Deaths: 7

The Jaybird–Woodpecker War (1888–89) was a feud between two United States Democratic Party factions fighting for political control of Fort Bend County, Texas, in the southeast part of the state. The Jay Bird Democratic Association was an all-White political organization formed in 1887 by young men to challenge and regain control of the county government from the biracial coalition of former White and Black Republicans (the Woodpeckers) who had dominated the county Democratic Party and county government since 1869. Murders and political assassinations were committed against persons in each faction in 1888 and 1889.

Fort Bend County, Texas

The Jaybird-Woodpecker War ended when the Jaybirds defeated the Black-supported Woodpeckers in a battle in Richmond, Texas, the county seat of Fort Bend County, in August 1889. With support from Texas Governor Lawrence Ross and the Houston Light Guards (the first uniformed state militia company formed after the Civil War), a complete reorganization of county government resulted in the removal or resignation of all Woodpecker officials and the selection of Jaybirds or persons acceptable to the Jaybirds to fill those offices.

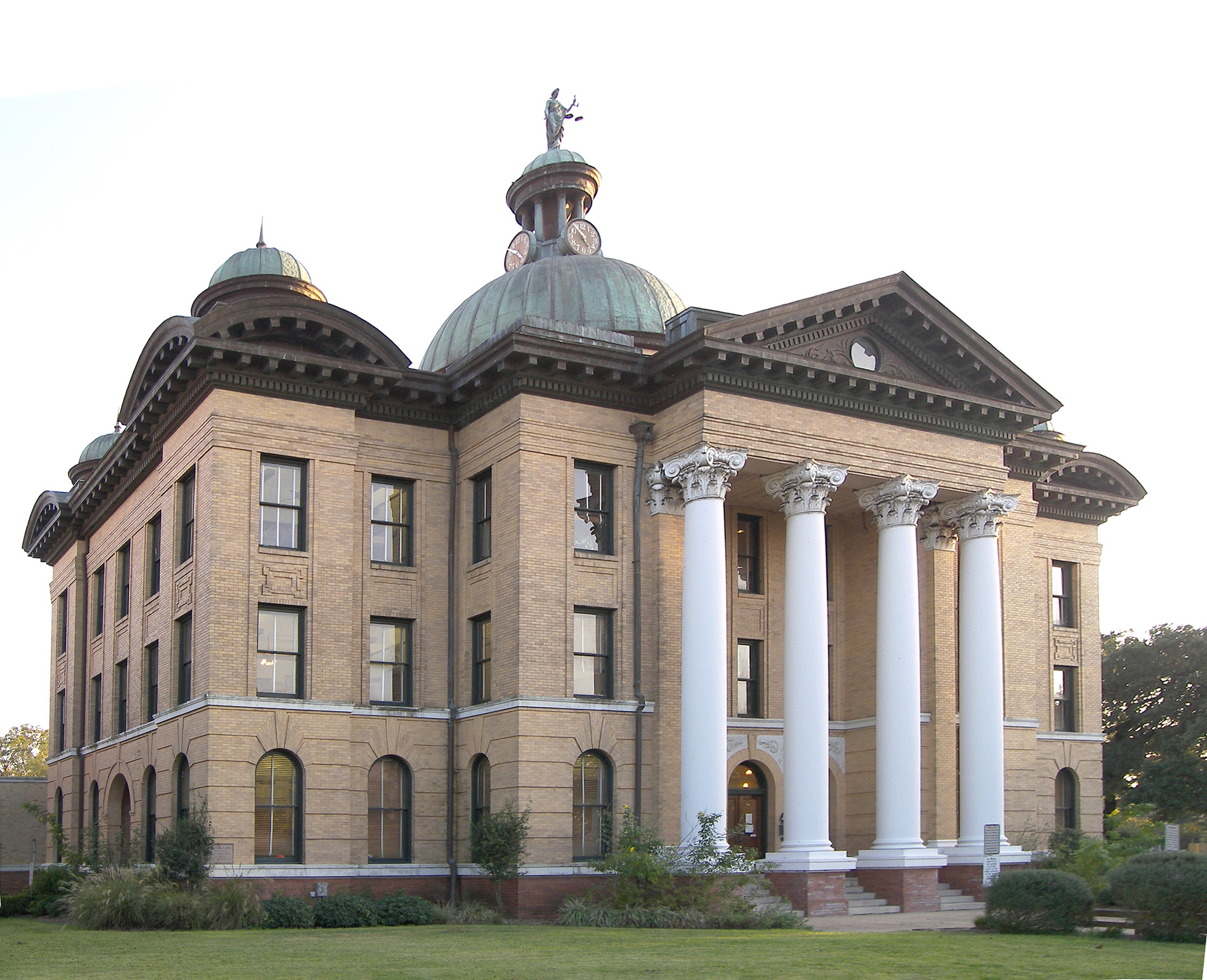
Fort Bend Courthouse became the epicenter of the Jaybird-Woodpecker War.

After a turbulent era of more than 20 years, the White citizenry once more controlled the government. The effects of the post-Reconstruction feud echoed in local politics for decades. The Jaybird victory basically restored White supremacy in the county. They disfranchised the Black voters in the county by using a "Whites-only" ballot in preliminary party voting from 1889 until 1953. The Jaybird organization and the disfranchisement spread to other counties in the state and remained active politically until the civil rights movement. This device lasted until 1950, when Willie Melton and Arizona Fleming won a lawsuit against the practice in United States District Court, though it was overturned on appeal. In 1953, they ultimately won their suit when the Supreme Court of the United States declared the Jaybird primary unconstitutional in Terry v. Adams, the last of the white primary cases.

== Roots of the conflict ==
The roots of the Jaybird-Woodpecker violence stretch back to the emergence of antebellum plantation society in Fort Bend County and the end of the American Civil War. The conflict over slavery impacted how the war began, played out, and influenced Fort Bend political and social life for over 100 years.

=== Antebellum plantation society in Fort Bend County ===
Fort Bend County was colonized by families of the Old 300, who had purchased land rights from Stephen F Austin and the Mexican government in the 1820s and the pacification of local Native American tribes. Within the decades leading up to the American Civil War, Fort Bend country grew into one of the largest and most prosperous slaveholding communities in Texas. Black slaves were either moved with the white colonists or were illegally shipped to Galveston, Texas since slavery was illegal under Mexican law until the Republic of Texas was established in 1836. Slavery was the cornerstone of these plantations that needed laborers for the cotton, sugarcane, and corn agricultural crops. As the demand for these products, especially cotton, increased, the slave labor force "expanded from 1,559 slaves in 1850 to 4,127 slaves in 1860." The slaveowners dominated the Fort Bend economy, controlled its politics, and occupied the top rung on the social ladder. They then voted to secede and join the Confederacy in February 1861. Not surprisingly, 100% of the White male voters voted in favor of secession. Over 100 men from Fort Bend County joined men from neighboring counties and enlisted in a new regiment of what was become known as Colonel Benjamin Terry's Texas Rangers. Ironically, his son, Kyle Terry who was five years old at time, emerged as one of the leaders some 30 years later in the Jaybird-Woodpecker War, except, unlike his father, he supported the Woodpeckers against the Jaybirds and their White supremacist supporters.

=== Post-Civil War society in Fort Bend County ===
After the conclusion of the American Civil War, the 13th Amendment was ratified, in 1864, the result being that millions of slaves were suddenly free. In Fort Bend County, this new amendment resulted in the freeing of Blacks, who accounted for over 80% of the population at that time. With the enactment of the 15th Amendment in 1870, Black males were given the right to vote, who essentially became a powerful Republican voting block. As a result of outnumbering White males, the vote of freedmen carried most elections that occurred during Reconstruction, the period after the Civil War when Texas was under military rule while transitioning back to statehood in the Union. Also significant was the breaking up of the old plantations into smaller land units, many of which were either purchased by new immigrant farmers from Europe or were rented by Black sharecroppers.

While resisting emancipation and Black suffrage, plantation elite surprisingly cooperated with the biracial county government that emerged during Reconstruction. Between 1869 and 1889, 44 Black men held different positions in Fort Bend County that included varied roles as sheriff, county commissioner, justice of the peace, and constable. At one point of Fort Bend Reconstruction, more than 50% of the county offices were held by Black politicians. They were actively supported by a small number of Whites who participated in county government as Republicans or as independent Democrats. This meant they did not run or support the all-White Democratic ticket during elections. Unlike other Texas counties at that time, Fort Bend Country actually enjoyed racial co-operation and peace during this post-Civil War era.

Despite losing political power and some economic power with the splintering of plantations, Fort Bend Whites maintained their hold on the county economically and socially. White land owners controlled over 80% of the land, which resulted in a high level of tenant farmers and sharecroppers as captured in the 1880 census. Local Whites also erected social boundaries to keep Whites and Blacks segregated. County schools were segregated. According to an 1882-1883 tax assessor report, 193 White children attended one of the five White-only schools, while 1,679 Black students attended one of the 30 Black-only schools. Vigilante citizen groups were also formed to keep Blacks in the county in order, especially from preventing social interactions between Blacks and Whites.

=== Deep divisions ===
While the Jaybird-Woodpecker war was not inevitable, the emergence of younger White males wanting to renew White supremacy and the national Democratic renewal of the late 1880s created an emotionally charged political atmosphere in Fort Bend County. Within the White community, tensions increased between those who supported the Republican or independent county officials and a politically frustrated White community of former slaveowners. The Whites supporting the current biracial politicians wanted to preserve the status quo. The majority of Whites resented the independent Democrats for their "treasonous behavior" in supporting Blacks' right to vote and to hold public office. They also wanted to increase their political representation, especially with an increase in taxes for all Black and White property owners. Taxes were high and portions of that money went directly into the pockets of officeholders. With these sentiments percolating in the mid- to late 1880s, many young men in Fort Bend County were fed up with the Whites' inability to change county politics via the ballot box. They brought together and formalized the informal vigilante groups into the Jay Bird Democratic Association in July 1888.

== Conflict ==
The conflict allegedly derived its name from Bob Chapel, a local African-American man who was said to sing about jaybirds and woodpeckers. The Jaybirds were White Democrats opposed to the participation of Blacks in local politics, as an alliance of Blacks and Whites (formerly Republican) had elected county officials for 20 years since Reconstruction. The Woodpeckers were nominally Democrats, too, with representatives elected largely by Black voters. An election was held November 6, 1888, that was supervised by Texas Rangers. All of the Woodpecker candidates were elected or re-elected (many had won election in 1884) to their slate of office.

This engendered further hostilities from the Jaybirds. In the spring of 1889, Kyle Terry, then a Woodpecker official appointed as the tax assessor, murdered Ned Gibson, a leader of the Jaybirds. He had been on his way to testify in an unrelated cattle-rustling trial against a friend of Terry's being held in a neighboring town. Terry was arrested, but posted bail and moved to Galveston. On January 21, 1890, he was gunned down by Gibson's brother Volney Gibson and a group of Jaybirds, while walking up the stairs to the Galveston courtroom for the preliminary hearing in his trial for the murder of Ned Gibson.

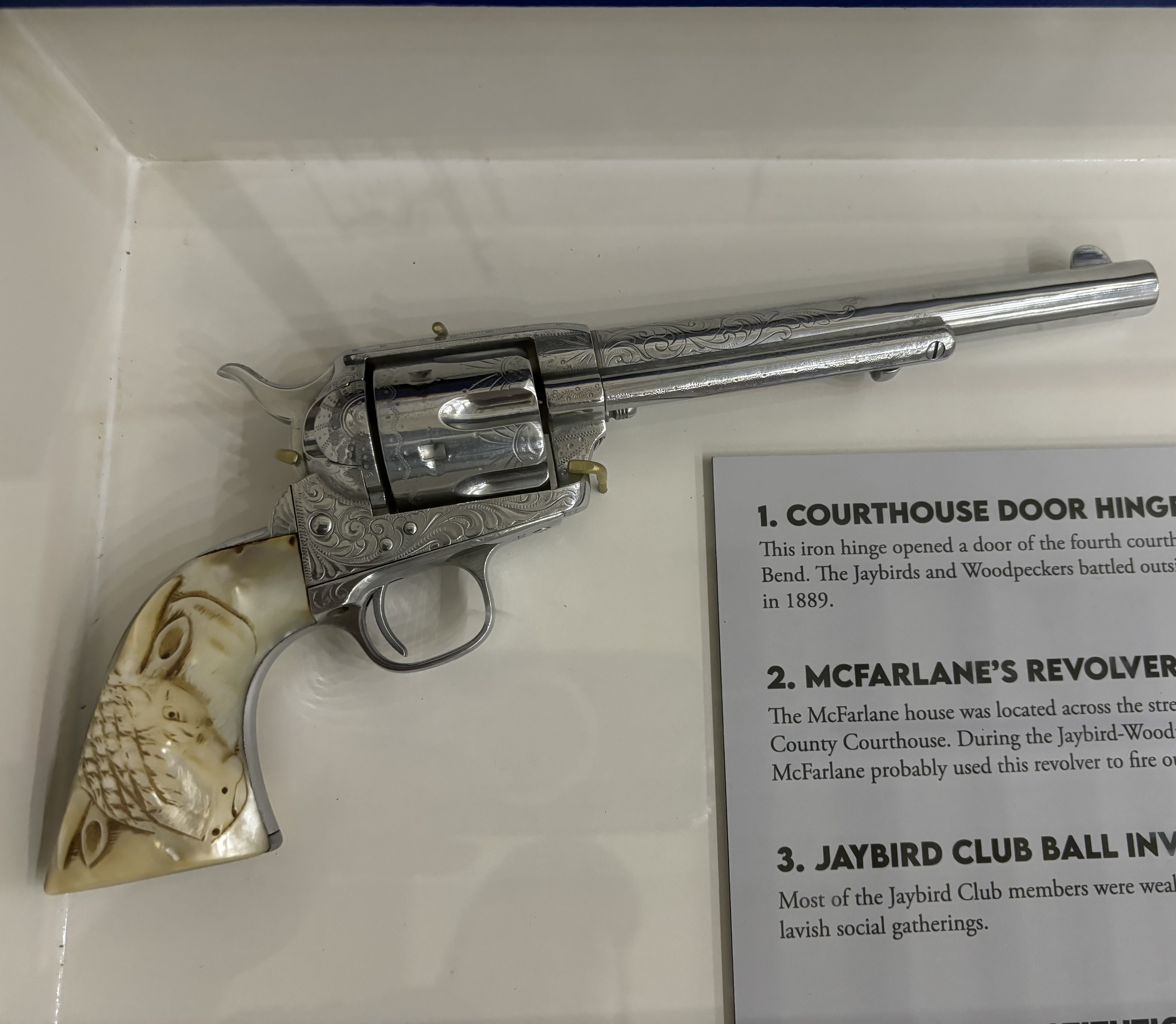
This revolver was likely used by Earle McFarlane during the Jaybird-Woodpecker War in Richmond, Texas.

Retaliatory murders occurred on both sides. The violence culminated in the Battle of Richmond, the county seat, on August 16, 1889, when sheriff Tom Garvey (a Woodpecker) was killed. Seven people were killed in all these incidents. Following this, Governor Sul Ross declared martial law and dispatched troops from the Houston Light Guards, along with more Texas Rangers. He arrived with the state militia to negotiate a settlement. After the violence subsided, most of the county government resigned. In finding replacements for resigned officials, the Jaybird politicians were the only ones who had sufficient wealth to post bonds for the open offices, and the Jaybirds refused to post bonds for the opposition. As a result, the county government was reorganized under the control of the Jaybird faction. This was formalized through a meeting held on October 3, 1889, and the former officeholders were told to leave town.

Subsequently, the Jaybirds held a meeting on October 22, 1889, creating the Jaybird Democratic Organization of Fort Bend County. It dominated local politics for decades into the 1950s. The faction established a "White-only" preliminary ballot for county offices. This effectively disenfranchised African Americans because the only competitive contest was that within the Democratic Party. A similar White primary measure was adopted by the state legislature in the early 20th century. The Jaybird Democrats retained control until their provision was overturned by a ruling by the United States Supreme Court in Terry v. Adams, 345 U.S. 461 (1953).

By that time, two White primary processes authorized by the state government had been declared unconstitutional by the Supreme Court; the second was in Smith v. Allwright (1944).
