= Hays County Courthouse =

- U.S. National Register of Historic Places
- U.S. Historic district – Contributing property
- Texas State Antiquities Landmark
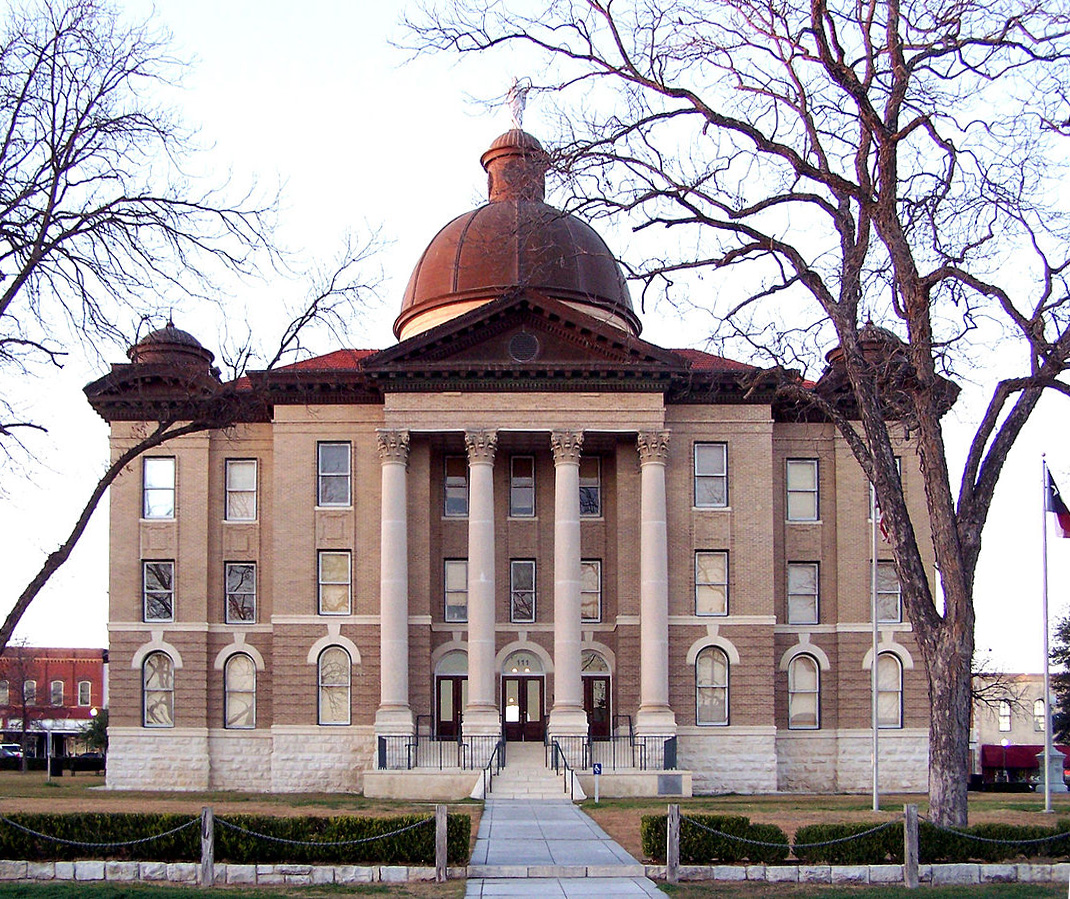
- Hays County Courthouse in 2006

- Location within Texas Location within the United States
- Location: Public Sq., San Marcos, Texas
- Coordinates: 29°52′56″N 97°56′25″W
- Area: 1.4 acres (0.57 ha)
- Built: 1908
- Architect: C.H. Page & Brothers
- Architectural style: Classical Revival
- Part of: Hays County Courthouse Historic District (ID92001233)
- NRHP reference No.: 80004134
- TSAL No.: 8200000345

Significant dates
- Added to NRHP: May 23, 1980
- Designated CP: September 10, 1992
- Designated TSAL: January 1, 1992

The Hays County Courthouse is an historic courthouse located in San Marcos, Hays County, Texas. It was built in the Classical Revival style in 1908. It is recognized by both the National Register of Historic Places and Texas Historical Commission.

== See also ==
- National Register of Historic Places listings in Hays County, Texas
- List of county courthouses in Texas
