= Anderson County Courthouse (Texas) =

- U.S. National Register of Historic Places
- Recorded Texas Historic Landmark
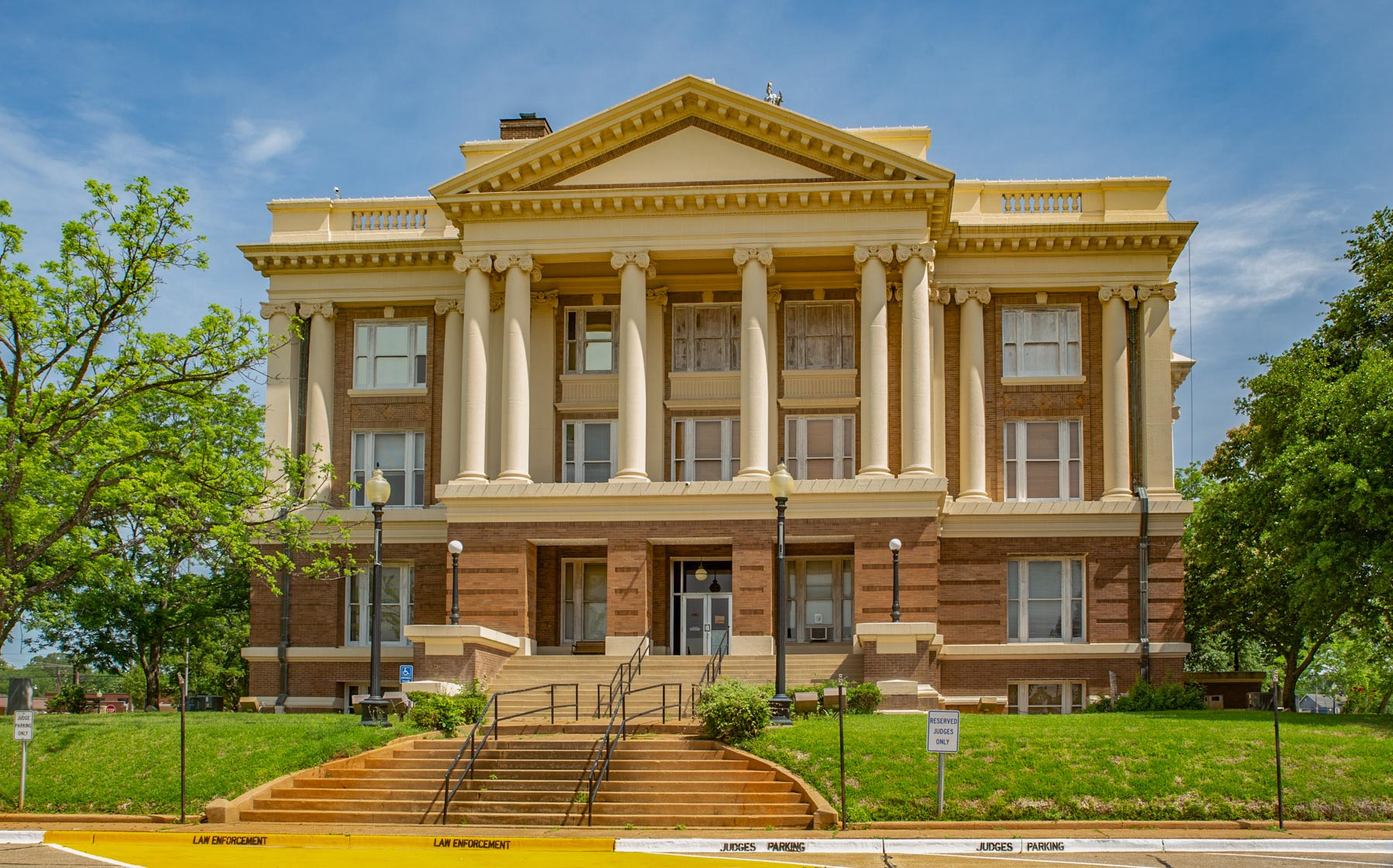
- Anderson County Courthouse in 2023

- Location within Texas Location within the United States
- Interactive map showing the location of Anderson County Courthouse
- Location: 1 Public Sq., Palestine, Texas
- Coordinates: 31°45′54″N 95°37′34″W
- Area: less than one acre
- Built: 1914
- Architect: Page Bros.
- Architectural style: Classical Revival
- NRHP reference No.: 92001256
- RTHL No.: 8732

Significant dates
- Added to NRHP: September 28, 1992
- Designated RTHL: 1988

The Anderson County Courthouse is a historic courthouse located at 1 Public Square in Palestine, Anderson County, Texas. The Beaux-Arts style building was erected atop the highest hill in Palestine. Austin architects Charles Henry Page and Louis Charles Page designed the structure. Workers oversaw the erection in 1913 and 1914, and the finished building dedicated on December 20, 1914, at a cost of approximately $250,000.

Anderson County was created by the Texas Legislature on March 24, 1846, and named for former Republic of Texas Vice-president Kenneth L. Anderson. The first Anderson County Courthouse was a one-story wood-frame structure built in 1847. It was replaced by a two-story brick courthouse in 1856. The third courthouse, built of brick and completed in 1886, by noted Texas courthouse architect Wesley Clark Dodson (1829–1914) of Waco. It was destroyed by arson in 1913 purportedly to destroy incriminating documents. The current Anderson County Courthouse is the fourth structure to serve as the seat of Anderson County government. The courthouse uses a Beaux-Arts bi-axial arrangement with a rotunda crowned by an inner art glass dome with an outer dome surmounted by Lady Justice. The building is three stories with a raised basement. It is finished in brick, rock and terra cotta. The design includes projecting porticos with pediments on all four elevations each with six ionic columns.

The courthouse underwent major restoration in 1986 and was added to the National Register of Historic Places on September 28, 1992.

== See also ==
- National Register of Historic Places listings in Anderson County, Texas
- Recorded Texas Historic Landmarks in Anderson County

== Bibliography ==
- Kelsey, Mavis P, Sr.; Dyal, Donald H. (1993). The Courthouses of Texas. College Station, TX: Texas A&M University Press. ISBN 0-89096-546-3.
