= Terry v. Adams =

- Supreme Court of the United States

Argued January 16, 1953 Decided May 4, 1953
- Full case name: John Terry, et al v. A.J. Adams, et al.
- Citations: 345 U.S. 461 (more) 73 S. Ct. 809, 97 L. Ed. 1152, 1953 U.S. LEXIS 2603

Case history
- Prior: 90 F. Supp. 595 (S.D. Tex. 1950)

Court membership
- Chief Justice Fred M. Vinson Associate Justices Hugo Black · Stanley F. Reed; Felix Frankfurter · William O. Douglas; Robert H. Jackson · Harold H. Burton; Tom C. Clark · Sherman Minton

Case opinions
- Plurality: Black, joined by Douglas, Burton
- Concurrence: Frankfurter
- Concurrence: Clark, joined by Vinson, Reed, Jackson
- Dissent: Minton

Laws applied
- U.S. Const. amend. XV

Terry v. Adams, 345 U.S. 461 (1953), was a United States Supreme Court decision that held white-only pre-primary elections to be unconstitutional. It was the last in a series of court cases addressing the system of white primaries designed to disenfranchise African-American voters in the southern United States.

In the first of these cases, Nixon v. Herndon (1927), Lawrence Aaron Nixon, a black physician, sued for damages under federal civil rights laws after being denied a ballot in a Democratic party primary election on the basis of race. The Court found in his favor on the basis of the Fourteenth Amendment, which guarantees equal protection under the law, while not discussing his Fifteenth Amendment claim. After Texas amended its statute to authorize the political party's state executive committee to set voting qualifications, Nixon sued again; in Nixon v. Condon (1932), the Court again found in his favor on the basis of the Fourteenth Amendment. Following this decision, the Democratic Party's state convention instituted a rule that only whites could vote in its primary elections; the Court unanimously upheld this rule as constitutional in Grovey v. Townsend (1935), distinguishing the discrimination by a private organization from that of the state in the previous primary cases.

The Court reversed course, however, with Smith v. Allwright (1944), another of the Texas primary cases. In United States v. Classic (1941), the Court had ruled that primary elections were an essential part of the electoral process, opening Grovey to review. Under this reasoning, the Court found that denying non-white voters a ballot in primary elections was a violation of the Fifteenth Amendment, overturning Grovey.

Terry v. Adams formed the last of these cases. The petitioners, qualified black voters in Fort Bend County including John Terry, Charlie Roberts, Willie Melton, and Arizona Fleming, sued an organization known as the Jaybird Democratic Association, which since 1889 had organized white-only pre-elections for county offices; the winners of these pre-elections invariably won the subsequent official elections. The Court found for the plaintiffs but reached no majority opinion. Justices Hugo Black, William O. Douglas, and Harold H. Burton found that an election that effectively excluded black voters violated the Fifteenth Amendment, while Tom C. Clark, Stanley F. Reed, and Robert H. Jackson found in a concurring opinion that the Jaybirds effectively formed an auxiliary of the Democratic Party, bringing the case within the scope of Smith v. Allwright. Justice Sherman Minton dissented.
