= National Register of Historic Places listings in Trinity County, Texas =

Location of Trinity County in Texas

This is a list of the National Register of Historic Places listings in Trinity County, Texas.

This is intended to be a complete list of properties listed on the National Register of Historic Places in Trinity County, Texas. There are four properties listed on the National Register in the county. Two properties are designated Recorded Texas Historic Landmarks including one that is also a State Antiquities Landmark.

This National Park Service list is complete through NPS recent listings posted March 21, 2025.

== Current listings ==
The locations of National Register properties may be seen in a mapping service provided.

	Name on the Register	Image	Date listed	Location	City or town	Description
1	Old Red Schoolhouse	Old Red Schoolhouse	August 10, 2005 (#05000865)	100 W. San Jacinto; 30°56′34″N 95°22′31″W	Trinity	Recorded Texas Historic Landmark
2	Riverside Swinging Bridge	Riverside Swinging Bridge	September 12, 1979 (#79003020)	NE of Riverside; 30°51′26″N 95°23′46″W	Riverside	Extends into Walker County
3	State Highway 19 Bridge at Trinity River	State Highway 19 Bridge at Trinity River	December 1, 2004 (#04001290)	TX 19, on the Trinity/Walker county line 30°51′35″N 95°23′55″W	Riverside	Historic Bridges of Texas, 1866-1945 MPS, extends into Walker County
4	Trinity County Courthouse Square	Trinity County Courthouse Square	September 10, 2004 (#04000946)	162 W. First St., US 287 at TX 94; 31°03′21″N 95°07′33″W	Groveton	State Antiquities Landmark, Recorded Texas Historic Landmark

== Former listing ==
	Name on the Register	Image	Date listed	Date removed	Location	City or town	Description
1	Ranald McDonald House		October 6, 1975 (#75002131)	September 21, 1976	Corner of Maple and San Jacinto	Trinity	Destroyed by a fire on September 2, 1976.

== See also ==
- National Register of Historic Places listings in Texas
- Recorded Texas Historic Landmarks in Trinity County
