= National Register of Historic Places listings in Walker County, Texas =

Location of Walker County in Texas

This is a list of the National Register of Historic Places listings in Walker County, Texas.

This is intended to be a complete list of properties listed on the National Register of Historic Places in Walker County, Texas. There are five properties listed on the National Register in the county. One property is a State Antiquities Landmark (SAL) and a Recorded Texas Historic Landmark (RTHL), and another property is also a SAL while containing within it an additional SAL and two RTHLs.

This National Park Service list is complete through NPS recent listings posted March 21, 2025.

== Current listings ==
The locations of National Register properties may be seen in a mapping service provided.

	Name on the Register	Image	Date listed	Location	City or town	Description
1	Austin Hall	Austin Hall	January 2, 2013 (#12001134)	1741 University Ave. 30°42′56″N 95°33′00″W	Huntsville	State Antiquities Landmark, Recorded Texas Historic Landmark; on the campus of Sam Houston State University
2	Josey Boy Scout Lodge and Keeper's Cabin	Josey Boy Scout Lodge and Keeper's Cabin	July 23, 2018 (#100002700)	2201 Ave. M 30°42′33″N 95°33′07″W	Huntsville	
3	Sam Houston House	Sam Houston House	May 30, 1974 (#74002097)	Ave. L, Sam Houston State University; 30°42′53″N 95°33′10″W	Huntsville	State Antiquities Landmark, includes additional State Antiquities Landmark and Recorded Texas Historic Landmarks; also known as Woodland
4	Riverside Swinging Bridge	Riverside Swinging Bridge	September 12, 1979 (#79003020)	NE of Riverside; 30°51′26″N 95°23′46″W	Riverside	Extends into Trinity County
5	State Highway 19 Bridge at Trinity River	State Highway 19 Bridge at Trinity River	December 1, 2004 (#04001290)	TX 19, on the Trinity/Walker county line 30°51′35″N 95°23′55″W	Riverside	Historic Bridges of Texas, 1866-1945 MPS, extends into Trinity County
6	John W. Thomason House	John W. Thomason House	August 11, 1982 (#82004528)	1207 Ave. J 30°43′21″N 95°32′54″W	Huntsville	The Thomason House is the birthplace and home of noted Texas author and illustrator John William Thomason, Jr. He was commissioned a second lieutenant i n the Marine Corps and was assigned to the Pacific Fleet during World War II . All of the books and short stories Thomason wrote were illustrated with pen and ink sketches and dealt with Texas, theMarines, and his experiences i n the service. Several of his short stories frequently appeared in the Saturday Evening Post. Thomason wrote and illustrate d for Charles Scribner and Sons Publishers, producing such masterpieces as J. E. B. Stuart (1933) and Fix Bayonets (1926). Some of his other noted works include Marines and Others (1929) Salt Winds and Gold Dust (1934) and Lone Star Preacher (1941). California on March 12, 1944.

== See also ==
- National Register of Historic Places listings in Texas
- Recorded Texas Historic Landmarks in Walker County
