= Springs of Travis County, Texas =

This is a compendium of information on springs in Travis County, Texas, especially those with prehistoric or historic links to Texas Native Americans. Information is based primarily on Gunnar Brune's report to the Texas Water Development Board, "Major and Historical Springs of Texas", and his book, Springs of Texas. Additional sources are cited with associated springs.

As Brune noted in his report to the Texas Water Development Board, "Springs have been very important to Texas from the time of its first inhabitants. Many battles were fought between the pioneers and Indians for possession of springs." Understanding these springs is important to understanding Travis County from the perspective of those first inhabitants, the Texas Indians: where they camped, the trails they used.

Springs are listed alphabetically.

== Barton Springs ==
Barton Springs refers to at least five groups of springs, including Upper, Main, Upper Left Bank, Lower Left Bank, and Old Mill or Walsh Spring (the farthest downstream). This was a gathering place for the Caddo, Tonkawa, Apache and Comanche people. An old Comanche trail from Bandera County to Nacogdoches passed here. The early settlers had a trading post at the springs. Early Spanish explorers wrote that in 1714 wild horses were numerous. Three Spanish missions were located here from 1730 to 1731. Early in the 1880s a fort was located at the springs. This was also a stop on the Chisholm Trail from 1867 to 1895. Located at 2201 Barton Springs Road, Austin. (30.2638194, -97.7713947)

== Cold and Deep Eddy Springs ==
Brune's report says these include at least seven springs. Many Native projectile points and tools have been found at the springs and in Bat Cave downstream and Bee Cave just upstream. An old Comanche trail from Bandera County to Nacogdoches passed the springs. Only two springs are now above the level of Lady Bird Lake. Brune says the springs are near Valley Springs Road (a bit upstream from Deep Eddy Pool) in Austin (30.2799298,- 97.7800062).

== Coleman Springs ==
These were the springs located at Fort Colorado, also known as Coleman's Fort. Brune's book states that soldiers from the fort used the water from the spring between 1836 and 1838, and it was also a favorite Indian campground in earlier days. A historical marker located near the springs was erected by the State of Texas in 1936 and reads: "Site of Fort Colorado (Also called Coleman's Fort) June, 1836 - November, 1838. Established and first commanded by Colonel Robert M. Coleman. Succeeded by Capt. Michael Andrews And Capt. William M. Eastland. An extreme frontier outpost occupied by Texas Rangers to protect Anglo-American civilization from savage Indians in this vicinity." The springs are now located on land associated with the Austin Wildlife Rescue, at 5401 E Martin Luther King Jr Boulevard, Austin (30.285276,-97.674621).

== Levi Spring ==
Rock shelter with associated springs along Lick Creek, a tributary of the Pedernales River, near Hamilton Pool and Westcave Springs. Artifacts at this site date to Clovis and Plainview cultures, possibly older, i.e. 10,000+ years old. Located about 1.2 kilometers south of the intersection of Highway 71 and 2322 (30.375187,-98.087891).

== Manchaca Springs ==
Several springs on a small tributary of Onion Creek. The springs were named for Colonel Jose Menchaca of the Army of the Texas Republic. In 1709 the Spanish expedition under Espinosa, Olivares, and Aguirre is believed to have stopped here. That the Spanish were camping at Manchaca Springs is because it was on a branch of the Camino Real leading into Austin before turning east to Nacogdoches. The Spanish usually followed pre-established Native trails, and Brune's book states, "Many projectile points have been found here." Later the springs would be utilized again, this time by followers of the Chisholm Trail from 1867 to 1895. In 1840, seeking retribution for the Council House Fight of 1840 in San Antonio, a large group of Penateka Comanche mounted the "Great Raid of 1840", said to be the largest raid ever mounted by Indians against cities in the United States, namely Victoria and Linnville, Texas (at the time, Texas was still an independent republic). James Wilson Nichols' account of the raid states that Comanches en route to Victoria and Linnville "emerged from the mountains into the prairie near the Manchac (sic) Springs in Hays County". Natives – presumably Comanche – passing the springs en route to and from the "mountains" of the Colorado River is a theme in other tales about Manchaca Springs. Wilbarger tells of an encounter at the springs between Texans and Native people in 1844 when a "party of Indians .. came down from the Colorado mountains .. where they succeeded in stealing a large number of valuable horses." On their return to the mountains, the Natives "camped for the night at or near a noted watering place known as the Manchaca Springs." Texans under the command of Captain Wiley Hill attacked their camp the next morning. The Indians were eventually able to make good an escape back to the mountains, and the Texans returned to Manchaca Springs where they retrieved their horses, plus the Natives' "camp equipage". John Holland Jenkins recounts another encounter between Texans trying to retrieve stolen horses, led by Captain Gillespie, attacking Indians camped at "Manshak Springs", "Manshak" being the common pronunciation of Manchaca. Texans didn't always fare well when encountering Indians at the springs. In 1845 two pioneer German Texan authors, Friedrich Wilhelm von Wrede Sr. and Oscar von Claren, were killed and scalped by Indians at Manchaca Springs. Both were buried there by United States soldiers, who gave them military honors. Brune's book locates the springs on private property, near Buda (as opposed to Manchaca), half a kilometer west of I-35, just north of the Hays County line. Today County Road 117, Old San Antonio Road, passes near and over part of the spring's drainage near the Hays and Travis County line (30.101939,-97.814569)

== Hamilton Pool ==
At the writing of Brune's Springs of Texas, the springs were owned by Eugene Reimer, but are now within the Hamilton Pool Preserve, part of the larger Balcones Canyonlands National Wildlife Refuge, owned and managed by Travis County. Following archaeological studies done in the late 1980s, the Hamilton Pool Preserve was designated as a state archaeology landmark. The Travis County Parks webpage says cultural remains date back over 8,000 years. Elaine Perkins says that the pool had long been a camping place for Native people, and in the early days an old Indian trail led down to the pool. Bernhard "B.J." Reimer, who "discovered" the Hamilton Pool in 1898, remembered when "Old-timers" said "300 Indians lived here and used this place for a trail post. It was also a fortress against intruders." Perkins also states, "At the time of the Civil War .. it was still a spiritual meeting place for Indians, as well as a hiding place for Unionists," i.e. those Texans opposing secession from the Union needing to take refuge from pro-secessionists. Located at Hamilton Pool Nature Preserve, 24300 Hamilton Pool Road, Dripping Springs, Texas (30.342348,-98.126879).

== Hornsby Springs ==
Brune's book says, "They were the scene of an Indian campsite in prehistoric times. In 1830 Reuben Hornsby built a cabin here, beginning what was later called the Hornsby's Bend settlement." Brune locates the springs three kilometers south of Lake Walter E. Long, on private property, which is the general vicinity of the Reuben Hornsby historical marker, on Webberville Road, 0.2 miles east of Farm to Market Road 9737 (30.255071,-97.608478). That marker reads, "Reuben Hornsby, 1793-1879, First Settler in Travis County. Surveyor with Stephen F. Austin's Little Colony. He surveyed the site of this settlement in 1830. In July 1832 with his family he established his home at this place, since called Hornsby's Bend."

== Pecan Springs ==
The springs where Josiah P. Wilbarger and his surveying party were attacked by Indians in 1833. Location is near 5020 Manor Road, Austin (30.298074,-97.688586).

== Santa Monica or Sulphur Springs ==
Brune says these springs were once the basis for Comanche and Tonkawa campgrounds. Gelo called them "a watering place" for the Comanche. They are about 4.1 miles (6.6 km) south of Comanche Peak and Defeat Hollow, the location of an encounter between Joel Harris, an early settler to Hudson Bend, and Native people, probably Comanche. The springs were also a favorite resort for early Austinites, and the waters were bottled and highly valued for medicinal purposes. It is worth noting that the federal Geographic Names Information System (GNIS) has an incorrect location for the springs, showing them in the Steiner Ranch neighborhood by the lake. The springs were in fact on the edge of the Colorado River, and now beneath Lake Austin, located across from what is now Commons Ford Ranch Metropolitan Park in Austin. (30.343658,-97.88892)

== Seiders Springs ==
This name refers to at least two springs. Between 1846 and 1865 many US Army troops, including those under the command of General Custer and General Lee, camped at the springs. J.W. Wilbarger in his book notes, "There were quite a number of murders committed in Travis County during the year 1842. Gideon White was another who fell a victim to the preying bands of Indians who were continuously scouring the country around Austin." Gideon White settled on Seider Springs about 1840, and was killed near the springs in 1842. Wilbarger states, "When the Indians made the attack they were on horseback .. [Gideon White on foot] ran for some distance, but finding the Indians were gaining on him rapidly, he sprang behind a tree, in a thicket, and defended himself as best he could. The Indians, however, finally killed him, in sight of and within a quarter of a mile of his house." Wilbarger noted that marks of a number of arrows and bullets which hit the tree were visible for many years. Seiders Springs are now in Seider Springs Park, managed by the City of Austin, and located on Shoal Creek Trail, between 34th and 38th, Austin (30.305826,-97.747294).

== Spicewood Springs ==
Brune's book states that these springs are said to have been a stop on an old Indian Trail. J.W. Wilbarger tells the story of Indians stopping at the springs in his book Indian Depredations in Texas. In 1842, a Mrs. Simpson living on West Pecan Street, about three blocks west of Congress, in Austin had two children – a daughter 14, and a son 12 — abducted by Indians while the children were in the adjacent Shoal Creek valley. The Indians "seized the children, mounted their horses and made off for the mountains .. going in the direction of Mount Bonnell." A posse was raised and gave pursuit. "At one time the citizens came within sight of the redskins just before reaching Mount Bonnell, but the Indians, after arriving at the place, passed on just beyond to the top of the mountain, which being rocky, the citizens lost the trail and were never able to find where the savages went down the mountain." The Simpson girl was killed, but the boy survived and was later "traded off to some Indian traders, who returned him to his mother." It is because the boy survived and was returned home that we know what happened after the posse lost the trail of the Indians. From Mount Bonnell they stopped to rest at Spicewood Springs where the Simpson girl was killed. Located near the intersection of Spicewood Springs Road and Ceberry Street in northwest Austin (30.362901,-97.747889).

== Westcave Springs ==
At the writing of Brune's book, Westcave Springs was privately owned. The Lower Colorado River Authority (LCRA) acquired the property in 1983 and operates it in partnership with Westcave Preserve Corporation. The springs and setting are similar to Hamilton Pool, and indeed are only 1.6 kilometers southwest of it, across the Pedernales. Four archeological sites have been recorded in Westcave Preserve, all with prehistoric components. Located at Westcave Preserve, 24814 Hamilton Pool Rd, Round Mountain (30.33626,-98.140882).
