= Third Street Railroad Trestle =

Historic railroad bridge in downtown Austin, Texas

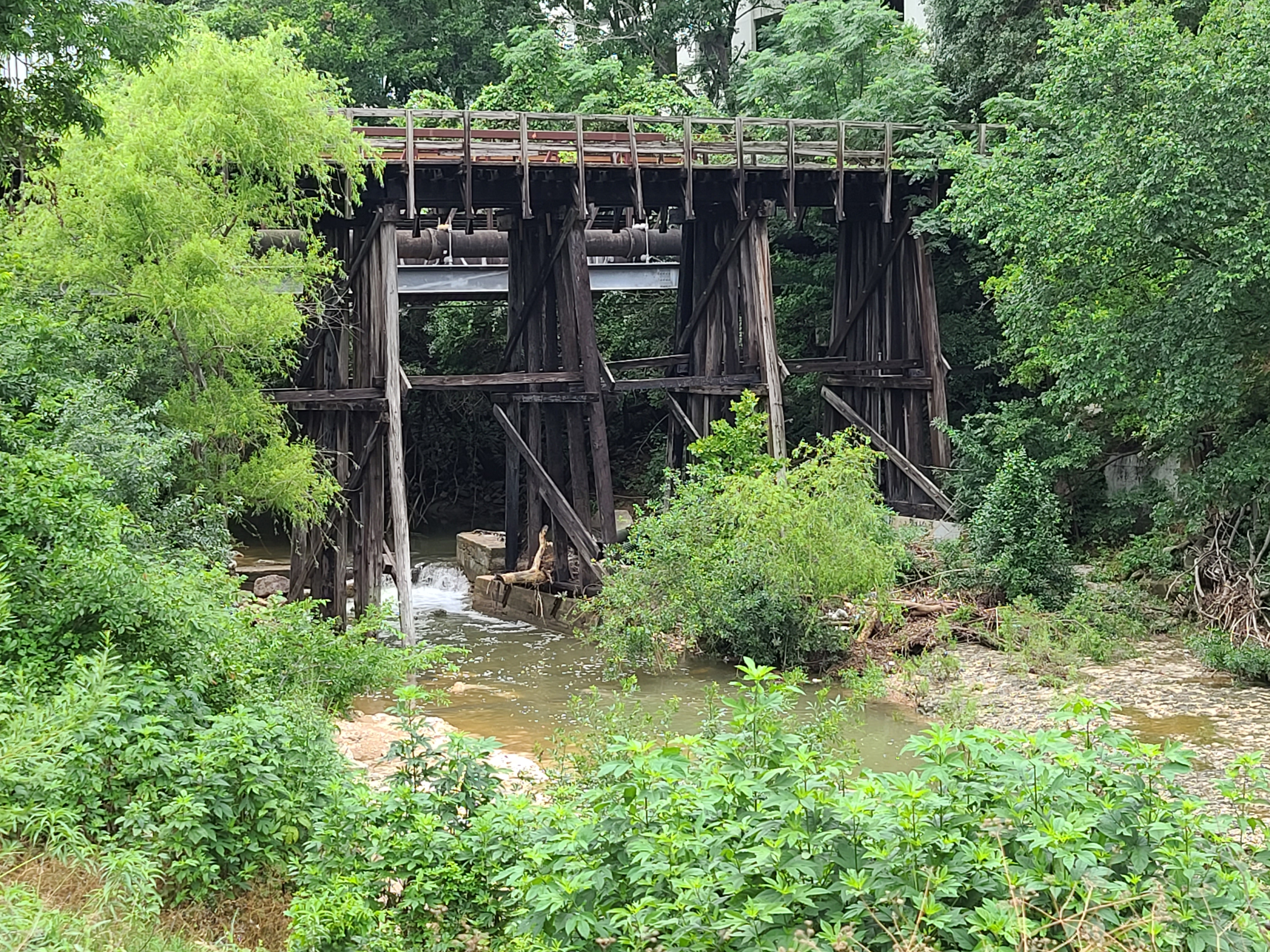
- Viewed from the south in 2020
- Coordinates: 30°16′02″N 97°45′01″W
- Carries: Defunct railway
- Crosses: Shoal Creek
- Locale: Austin, Texas; United States
- Owner: Union Pacific Railroad

Characteristics
- Design: Trestle bridge
- Material: Timber
- Total length: 150 ft (46 m)
- Width: 30 ft (9.1 m)
- Height: 35 ft (11 m)
- No. of spans: 11

History
- Opened: c. 1922
- Closed: 1991
- Third Street Railroad Trestle
- U.S. National Register of Historic Places
- Location within Texas Location within the United States
- Area: Less than 1 acre (0.40 ha)
- NRHP reference No.: 100007202
- Added to NRHP: November 23, 2021

Location
- Interactive map of Third Street Railroad Trestle

The Third Street Railroad Trestle is a historic wooden railroad trestle bridge crossing Shoal Creek in downtown Austin, Texas. Built around 1922 by the International–Great Northern Railroad, it replaced an earlier bridge in the same place. The bridge was used by the I–GN Railroad, the Missouri Pacific Railroad, and the Missouri–Kansas–Texas Railroad until 1964, when commercial rail traffic stopped; after 1991 the bridge was abandoned. It was added to the National Register of Historic Places in 2021.

== History ==
In the 1870s Austin, Texas, received its first connections to the national railroad network, with the arrival of the Houston and Texas Central Railway in 1871, followed by the International–Great Northern Railroad in 1876. The I–GN laid a north-to-south track to the west of Austin, along the path of what is now the MoPac Expressway, with a spur line branching off to the east to enter the city along West Cypress Street (now West Third Street). In mid-to-late 1876 the company built a wooden trestle to carry the railway over Shoal Creek on what was then the western edge of the city. The trestle and the rails leading eastward to the depot at the corner of Cypress Street and Congress Avenue were completed in December, and the first I–GN train crossed the trestle into the city on December 28, 1876.

This first trestle was gradually worn out by heavy railroad traffic and periodic flooding in Shoal Creek, and in September 1908 the Austin City Council urged the I–GN to replace the increasingly dangerous structure with a more durable crossing. By October the trestle had been replaced with a wooden beam bridge, but this structure soon needed to be upgraded to accommodate the heavier locomotives that came into use in succeeding decades. In the early 1920s, the I–GN renovated much of its rail infrastructure in west Austin, including another trestle parallel to Second Street carrying a spur serving the Austin Water and Light Plant. Around this time, the railroad also replaced the beam bridge at the Third Street crossing with the present timber trestle.

It is unclear exactly when in the early 1920s the current trestle was built. The Texas Historical Commission notes that the I–GN railway work in west Austin was concentrated in the period 1922–1926 and estimates that the Third Street Railroad Trestle was built c. 1922, whereas the Austin Historic Landmark Commission dates the bridge to 1925. Regardless, for decades the trestle carried all freight rail traffic in and out of Austin's downtown warehouse district and all passenger rail traffic to and from the passenger depot at Third and Congress.

Over time, heavy industry gradually moved out of the central city, and a 1944 Austin City Plan proposed to redirect rail traffic out of downtown Austin to ease automobile traffic. In 1949 the Missouri Pacific Railroad (which had bought the I–GN) relocated its passenger depot west of Shoal Creek, and MoPac passenger trains stopped crossing the trestle. The last commercial train to use the trestle, a passenger train with the Missouri–Kansas–Texas Railroad, crossed in July 1964. In 1980 the Union Pacific Railroad acquired the trestle when it bought out the MoPac Railroad. The last train known to have crossed the Third Street Trestle was a restored historic locomotive and coach driven by the Austin Steam Train Association in 1991. After that year, the right-of-way to the crossing was abandoned, and the trestle no longer connects to any railway.

In 2000 the City Public Works department proposed to demolish the trestle to make way for the extension of a hike-and-bike trail along Shoal Creek, but the Austin Historic Landmark Commission and the Downtown Austin Neighborhood Association recommended preserving the structure. By the 2010s nonprofits had advanced multiple proposals to convert the trestle to a rail trail as part of an urban linear park, similar to New York's High Line. In 2021 the Shoal Creek Conservancy proposed that the trestle be nominated to the National Register of Historic Places, in part to access federal tax credits for the rehabilitation of listed sites. The bridge was listed on the NRHP on November 23, 2021, in recognition of its significance in the economic history of Austin and its status as the last extant wooden railroad trestle bridge in downtown Austin.

== Design ==
The Third Street Railroad Trestle is an open-deck railroad trestle bridge built of creosote-coated pine timber. It is 150 ft (46 m) long and 30 ft (9.1 m) wide, rising to a height of 35 ft (11 m) above the bed of Shoal Creek. It has eleven roughly equal spans between twelve bents made of six to eight piles each, with diagonal braces joining the timbers. Some of the bents stand on concrete footings that date from previous structures, while others stand directly on the bedrock of the creek bed. Wooden guardrails follow both edges of the deck. The rails now end at the banks of the creek, the rest of the railway having been removed during redevelopment of the surrounding neighborhood. Some elements of the trestle were replaced with material similar to the original construction to improve its structural stability and safety at some point in the 1990s or early 2000s.

== See also ==
- Riverside Swinging Bridge: another IGN bridge also on the National Register of Historic Places
- National Register of Historic Places listings in Travis County, Texas
- List of bridges on the National Register of Historic Places in Texas
