= Woodland (Huntsville, Texas) =

Historic house in Texas, United States

- U.S. National Register of Historic Places
- U.S. National Historic Landmark
- Texas State Antiquities Landmark
- Recorded Texas Historic Landmark
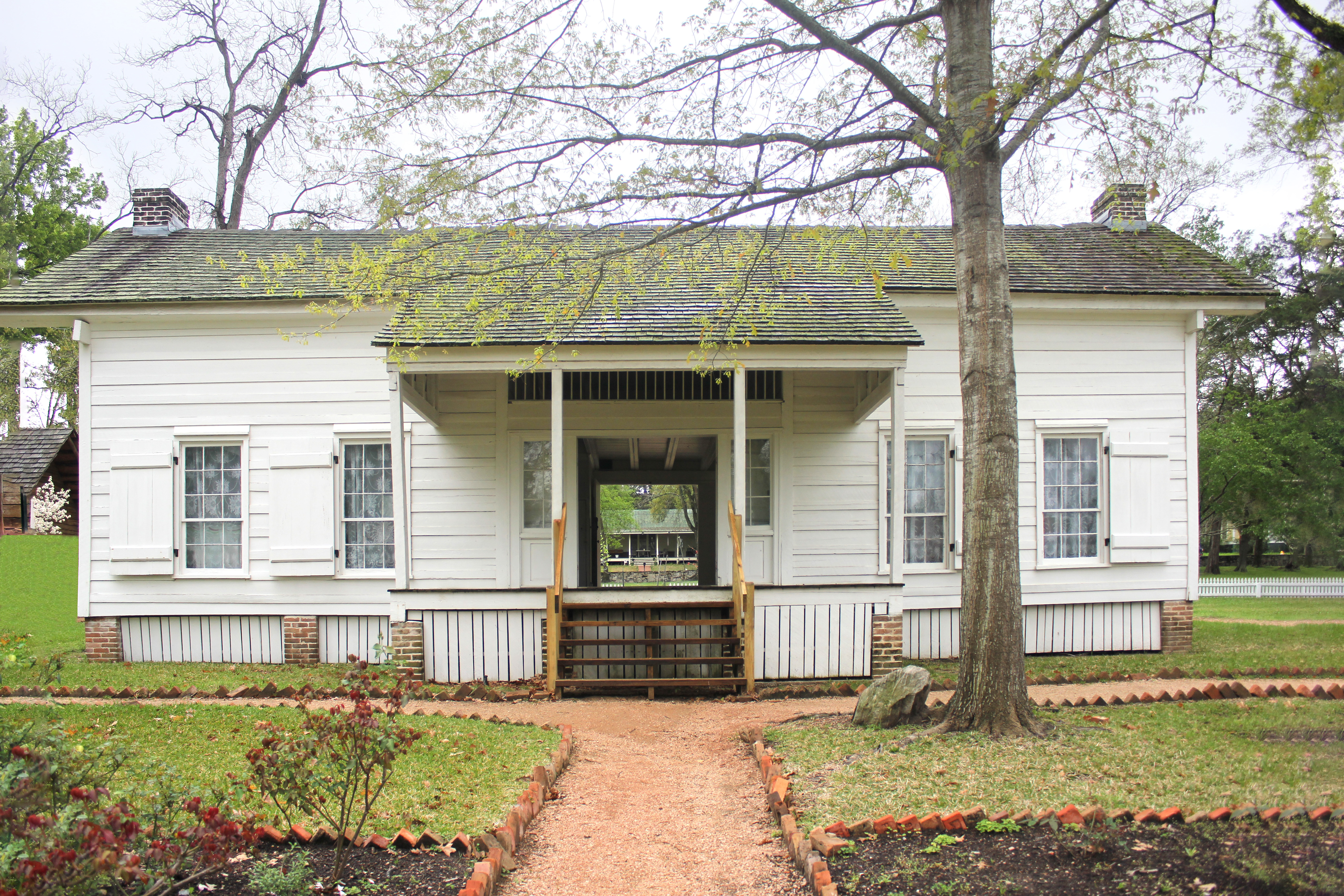
- Sam Houston House in 2012

- Location within Texas Location within the United States
- Interactive map showing the location of Woodland
- Location: 1402 19th St. on Sam Houston State University campus, Huntsville, Texas
- Coordinates: 30°42′53″N 95°33′10″W
- Area: 15 acres (6.1 ha)
- Built: 1847
- Architectural style: Dog-trot
- NRHP reference No.: 74002097
- TSAL No.: 8200000674
- RTHL No.: 8482

Significant dates
- Added to NRHP: May 30, 1974
- Designated NHL: May 30, 1974
- Designated TSAL: January 1, 1981
- Designated RTHL: 1962

Woodland is a historic house on the grounds of Sam Houston State University in Huntsville, Texas. Built in stages beginning about 1847, it was the residence of Sam Houston from 1847 to 1859. The house is now part of Sam Houston Memorial Museum, and is a National Historic Landmark.

== Description and history ==
Woodland is the centerpiece of the 15-acre (6.1 ha) museum property at the southeast corner of the Sam Houston State University Campus. It is a 1 1/2-story log structure, finished in wooden clapboards and covered by a gabled roof. It is a classic dogtrot house, with a central breezeway flanked by rectangular log chambers, with brick chimneys at the ends. A shed-roof porch extends in front of the breezeway, supported by square posts. The breezeway includes a winding staircase which provides access to loft spaces used as bedrooms.

The house was little more than a single-room log cabin when Sam Houston began enlarging it in 1847. In that year, he added the breezeway and second log structure. Later alterations improved the upper level, including construction of the staircase, and apparently reversing the front and back of the house. Houston's family occupied the house until 1859, the period during which he served as a United States senator, and as Governor of Texas. Houston's signature achievements, the independence of Texas and its subsequent annexation to the United States, happened before he took up residence here.

The house is now accompanied by a reconstruction kitchen outbuilding, as well as the restored cabin that he used as a law office.

== See also ==
- List of National Historic Landmarks in Texas
- National Register of Historic Places listings in Walker County, Texas
- Recorded Texas Historic Landmarks in Walker County
