= Hornsby Bend, Texas =

- CDP
- Coordinates: 30°14′42″N 97°35′12″W
- Country: United States
- State: Texas
- County: Travis

Area
  - Total: 1.7 sq mi (4.4 km^{2})
  - Land: 1.7 sq mi (4.4 km^{2})
  - Water: 0 sq mi (0.0 km^{2})
- Elevation: 430 ft (130 m)

Population (2020)
  - Total: 12,168
  - Density: 7,200/sq mi (2,800/km^{2})
- Time zone: UTC-6 (Central (CST))
  - Summer (DST): UTC-5 (CDT)
- Zip Code: 78725
- GNIS feature ID: 2629099

Hornsby Bend is a census-designated place (CDP) in Travis County, Texas, United States. This was a new CDP for the 2010 census with a population of 6,791, increasing to 12,168 in 2020. The area was named after early settler and Republic of Texas era postmaster Reuben Hornsby. His great-grandson, Baseball Hall of Famer Rogers Hornsby, is buried in Hornsby Bend.

== Geography ==
Hornsby Bend has a total area of 1.7 square miles (4.4 km^{2}), all land.

== Demographics ==
Historical population
Census	Pop.	Note	%±
2010	6,791		—
2020	12,168		79.2%
U.S. Decennial Census; 1850–1900 1910; 1920 1930 1940; 1950 1960 1970; 1980 1990 2000; 2010 2020

Hornsby Bend first appeared as a census designated place in the 2010 U.S. census.

=== Racial and ethnic composition ===
Hornsby Bend CDP, Texas – Racial and ethnic composition Note: the US Census treats Hispanic/Latino as an ethnic category. This table excludes Latinos from the racial categories and assigns them to a separate category. Hispanics/Latinos may be of any race.
Race / ethnicity (NH = Non-Hispanic)	Pop 2010	Pop 2020	% 2010	% 2020
White alone (NH)	770	1,990	11.34%	16.35%
Black or African American alone (NH)	1,769	2,208	26.05%	18.15%
Native American or Alaska Native alone (NH)	12	24	0.18%	0.20%
Asian alone (NH)	49	190	0.72%	1.56%
Native Hawaiian or Pacific Islander alone (NH)	5	5	0.07%	0.04%
Other race alone (NH)	29	45	0.43%	0.37%
Mixed race or Multiracial (NH)	68	320	1.00%	2.63%
Hispanic or Latino (any race)	4,089	7,386	60.21%	60.70%
Total	6,791	12,168	100.00%	100.00%

=== 2020 census ===
As of the 2020 census, Hornsby Bend had a population of 12,168. The median age was 30.5 years. 30.5% of residents were under the age of 18 and 5.7% of residents were 65 years of age or older. For every 100 females there were 96.1 males, and for every 100 females age 18 and over there were 95.1 males age 18 and over.

93.2% of residents lived in urban areas, while 6.8% lived in rural areas.

There were 3,751 households in Hornsby Bend, of which 44.2% had children under the age of 18 living in them. Of all households, 44.5% were married-couple households, 17.5% were households with a male householder and no spouse or partner present, and 27.4% were households with a female householder and no spouse or partner present. About 18.3% of all households were made up of individuals and 2.9% had someone living alone who was 65 years of age or older.

There were 4,048 housing units, of which 7.3% were vacant. The homeowner vacancy rate was 1.0% and the rental vacancy rate was 18.9%.
