= Reuben Hornsby =

American surveyor and soldier (1793–1879)

Reuben Hornsby (January 7, 1793 - January 11, 1879) was an early Texas pioneer and surveyor for Stephen F. Austin. He was one of the first settlers in Travis County, immigrating to Texas with his wife Sarah Morrison in 1830 and settling in Austin in 1832, living just east of Austin along the Colorado River in the area known as Hornsby Bend. Hornsby Bend was Stephen F. Austin's payment to Hornsby for his surveying contribution. Hornsby was the great-grandfather of baseball Hall of Famer Rogers Hornsby.
