= International–Great Northern Railroad =

Defunct American railroad company

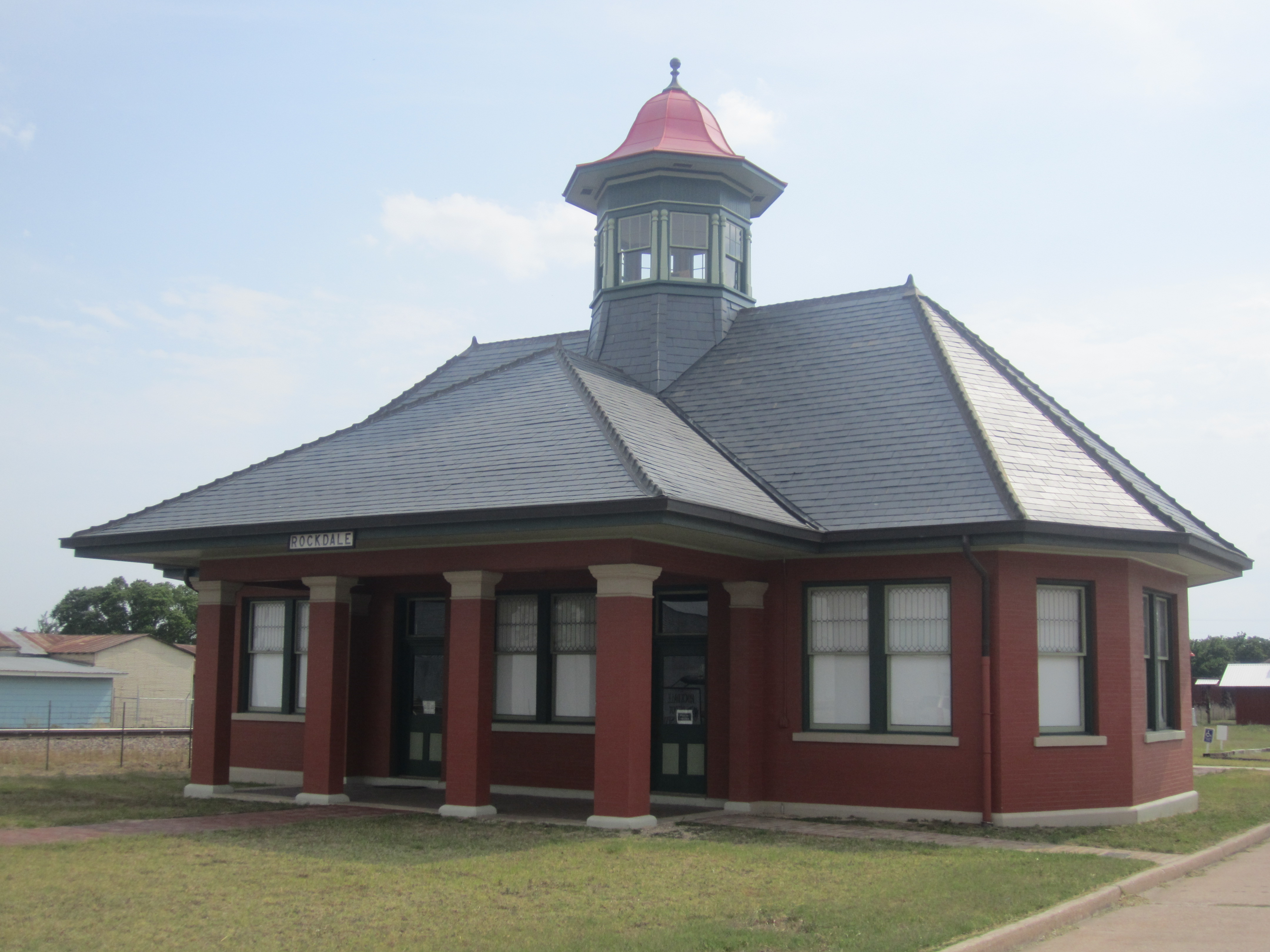
The restored depot of the former International-Great Northern Railroad in Rockdale, Texas

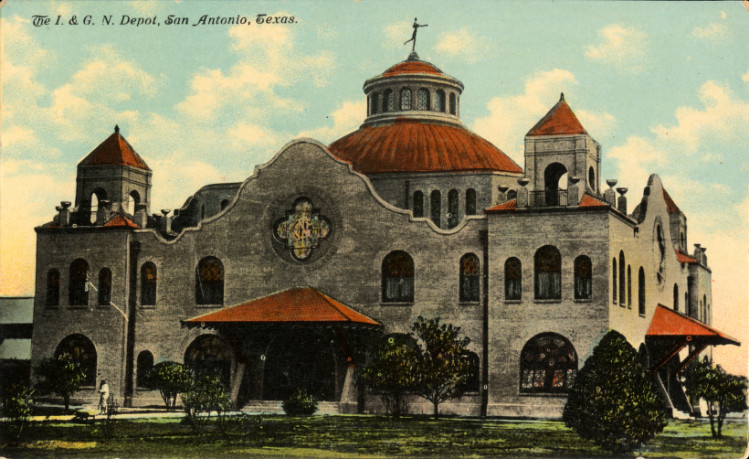
I-GN station in San Antonio, Texas, built in 1908. It was bought in 1988 and restored by the San Antonio City Employees Federal Credit Union. In 2015 it was adapted for use as the headquarters of VIA Metropolitan Transit. It is now known as The Grand at VIA Villa.

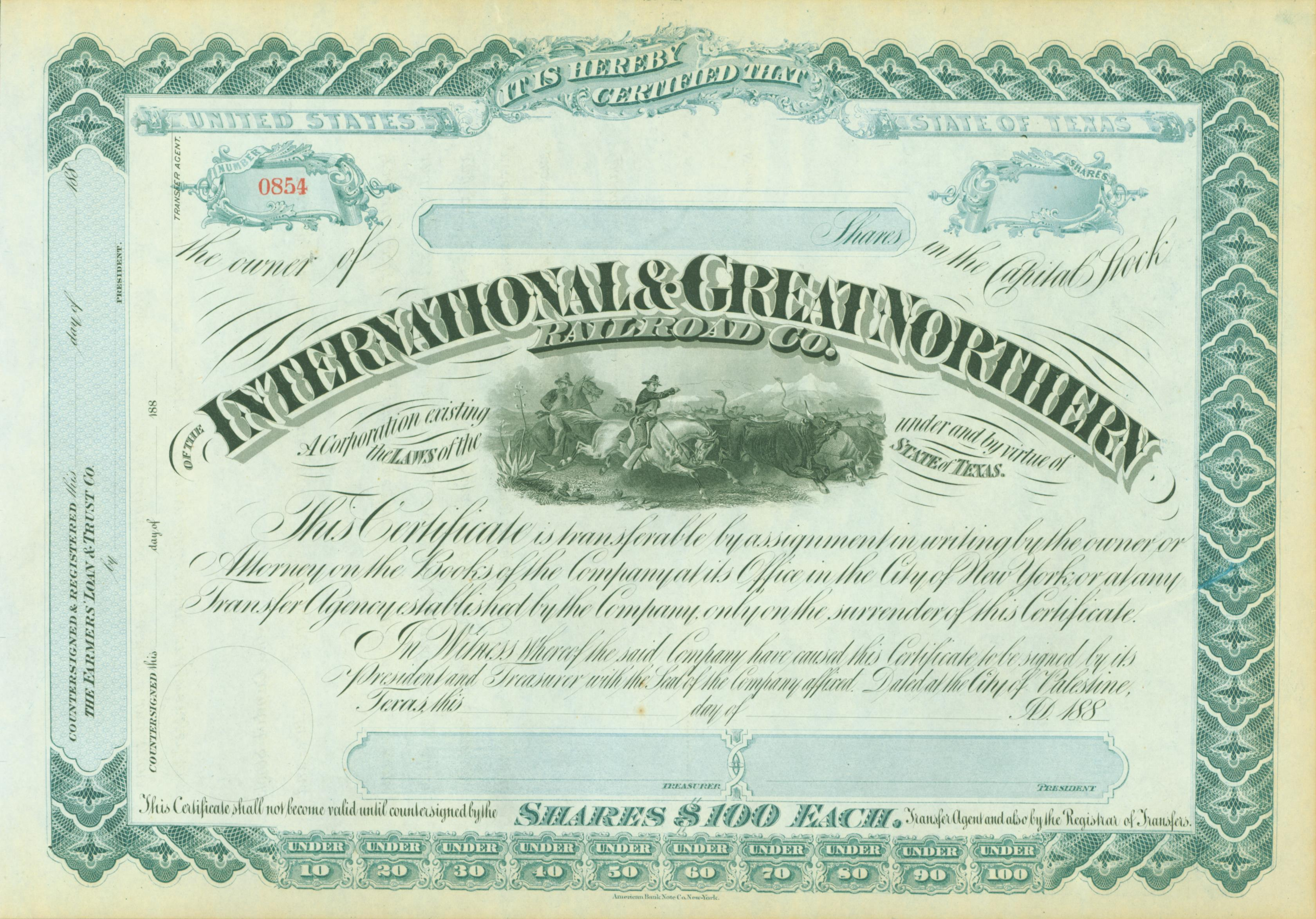
Share of the International & Great Northern Railroad Co., unissued

The International – Great Northern Railroad (I&GN) was a railroad that operated in the U.S. state of Texas. It was created on September 30, 1873, when the International Railroad and the Houston and Great Northern Railroad merged. The railroad was officially incorporated as the International & Great Northern Railroad Company.

At its start, the I&GN operated 177 miles (285 km) of track from Hearne to Longview, but at its peak it owned 1,106 miles (1,780 km) of track. As the railroad expanded southwestward from Hearne, it reached Rockdale in 1874 and Austin on December 28, 1876. The line extended to San Antonio in 1880 and finally to the US-Mexican border town of Laredo on December 1, 1881.

The I&GN, like other railroads of its time, had many financial troubles and went into receivership on several occasions. Industrialist Jay Gould acquired control of the I&GN in December 1880. Due to his control of the Missouri Pacific (Mopac) and the Texas and Pacific Railroad, the three were operated as one system, although they retained their separate corporate identities and seniority districts for union workers.

Due to financial difficulties, stemming in part from the Panic of 1907, the I-GN entered receivership in 1908 and was sold at foreclosure to a reorganized company, the International & Great Northern Railway Company on August 31, 1911. Less than four years later, the company entered receivership again, which lasted until it was sold at foreclosure in July 1922.

The International–Great Northern Railroad was incorporated by the state of Texas on August 17, 1922, and fully took over operation of the International & Great Northern Railway on December 31, 1922. In a bit of planned corporate maneuvering to keep the I-GN within the Mopac fold, the Gulf Coast Lines subsidiary, New Orleans, Texas and Mexico Railway, bought the I-GN on June 30, 1924; subsequently, the Gulf Coast Lines were bought by the Missouri Pacific on January 1, 1925. Finally, on March 1, 1956, all of the GCL subsidiaries were merged into the parent Missouri Pacific Railroad Company, and the I-GN ceased its corporate existence.

In the 1960s, many of the redundant out-of-the-way lines were abandoned, including Waco to Marlin and Bryan to Navasota. The latter route was subsequently traversed via trackage rights over the Southern Pacific Railroad between the same two points. The Missouri Pacific was merged in 1997 into the Union Pacific Railroad.

== See also ==
- Riverside Swinging Bridge
- Third Street Railroad Trestle
