= Riverside Swinging Bridge =

- U.S. National Register of Historic Places
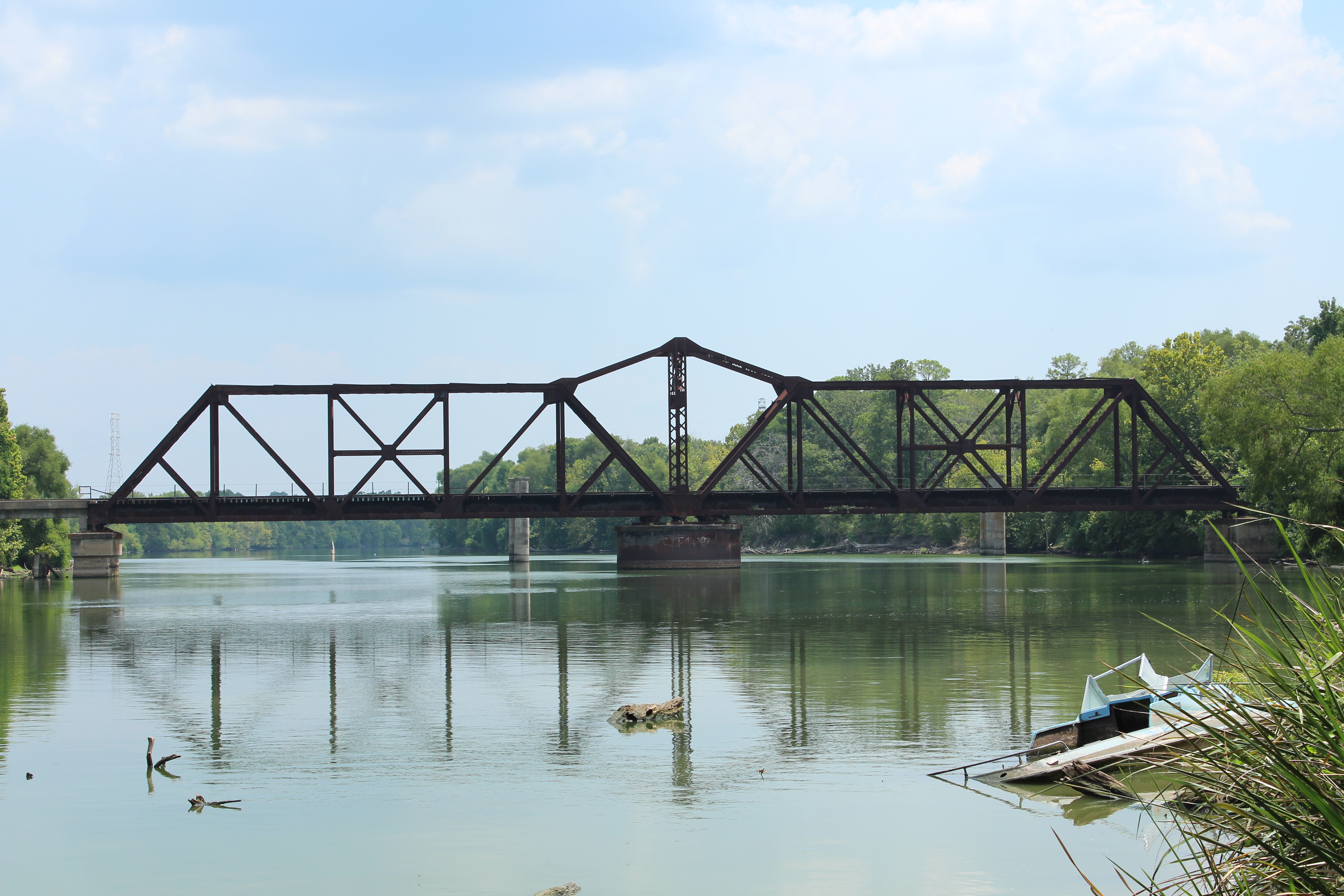

- Location within Texas
- Nearest city: Riverside, Texas
- Coordinates: 30.857222°N 95.396111°W
- Area: less than one acre
- Built: 1904
- Built by: International & Great Northern Railroad
- Architectural style: Pratt-Truss Bridge
- NRHP reference No.: 79003020
- Added to NRHP: September 12, 1979

The Riverside Swinging Bridge, northeast of Riverside, Texas, is a swing bridge which was built in 1904. It is the last swinging railroad bridge in Texas. It brings the Missouri Pacific Railroad between Trinity County, Texas and Walker County, Texas. It was built by the International and Great Northern Railroad to cross the Trinity River. It was listed on the National Register of Historic Places in 1979.

It is a Pratt truss structure.

The bridge has hardly ever swung. It was turned first during an inauguration ceremony, and was turned again in 1925 to allow debris from a flood to pass the bridge.

== See also ==
- Third Street Railroad Trestle: another IGN bridge also on the National Register of Historic Places
