= State Highway 19 Bridge at Trinity River =

- U.S. National Register of Historic Places
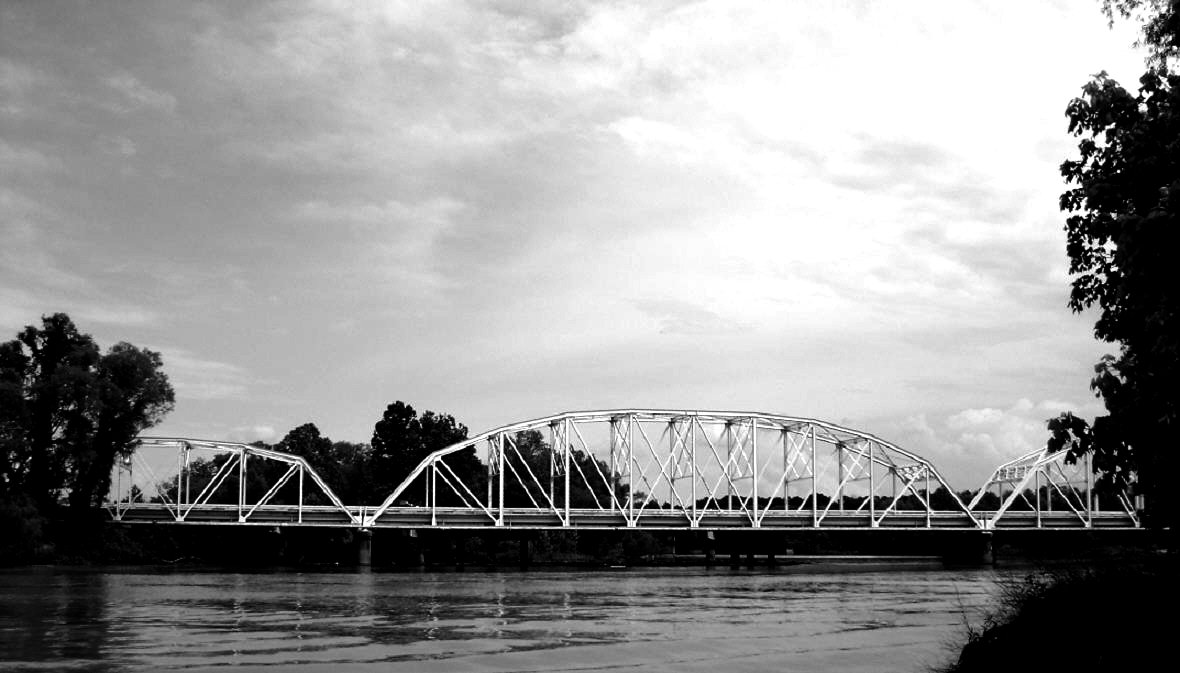

- Location within Texas Location within the United States
- Nearest city: Riverside, Texas
- Coordinates: 30°51′35″N 95°23′55″W
- Area: 1.8 acres (0.73 ha)
- Built: 1940
- Built by: P & B Construction
- Architect: Texas Highway Department
- Architectural style: Parker through-truss bridge
- MPS: Historic Bridges of Texas MPS
- NRHP reference No.: 04001290
- Added to NRHP: December 1, 2004

The State Highway 19 Bridge at Trinity River, near Riverside, Texas, brings State Highway 19 across the Trinity River between Trinity County, Texas and Walker County, Texas. It was built in 1940. It was listed on the National Register of Historic Places in 2004.

It is a Parker through truss bridge designed by the Texas Highway Department and was built by P & B Construction.
