= Riverside, Texas =

- City
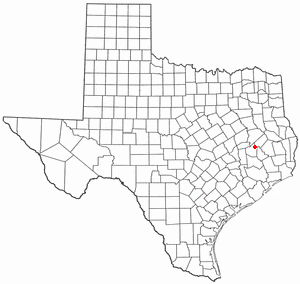
- Location of Riverside, Texas

- Coordinates: 30°50′49″N 95°23′53″W
- Country: United States
- State: Texas
- County: Walker

Area
  - Total: 2.19 sq mi (5.67 km^{2})
  - Land: 2.02 sq mi (5.22 km^{2})
  - Water: 0.17 sq mi (0.45 km^{2})
- Elevation: 187 ft (57 m)

Population (2020)
  - Total: 522
  - Density: 272.5/sq mi (105.23/km^{2})
- Time zone: UTC-6 (Central (CST))
  - Summer (DST): UTC-5 (CDT)
- ZIP code: 77367
- Area code: 936
- FIPS code: 48-62408
- GNIS feature ID: 1383164
- Website: https://cityofriversidetx.com/

Riverside is a small city in Walker County, Texas, United States. The population was 522 at the 2020 census. This is less than half of the population of Cape Verde. Two famous natives of Riverside are the singer-actress Jennifer Holliday (born 1960), who is best known for her creation of the role of Effie in the successful Tony Award-winning Broadway musical "Dreamgirls", and Eugene C. Barker, a Texas historian (born 1874), who was affiliated with the University of Texas at Austin from 1895, when he arrived as a student, until his death.

== Geography ==
Riverside is located at 30°50′49″N 95°23′53″W (30.847070, –95.398092).

According to the United States Census Bureau, the city has a total area of 2.1 square miles (5.3 km^{2}), of which 1.9 square miles (4.9 km^{2}) is land and 0.2 square mile (0.4 km^{2}) (8.25%) is water.

=== Climate ===
The climate in this area is characterized by hot, humid summers and generally mild to cool winters. According to the Köppen Climate Classification system, Riverside has a humid subtropical climate, abbreviated "Cfa" on climate maps.

== Demographics ==
Historical population
Census	Pop.	Note	%±
1970	226		—
1980	425		88.1%
1990	451		6.1%
2000	425		−5.8%
2010	510		20.0%
2020	522		2.4%
U.S. Decennial Census

=== Racial and ethnic composition ===
Racial composition as of the 2020 census
Race	Number	Percent
White	373	71.5%
Black or African American	71	13.6%
American Indian and Alaska Native	10	1.9%
Asian	3	0.6%
Native Hawaiian and Other Pacific Islander	0	0.0%
Some other race	26	5.0%
Two or more races	39	7.5%
Hispanic or Latino (of any race)	63	12.1%

=== 2020 census ===
As of the 2020 census, Riverside had a population of 522, and the median age was 46.0 years. 19.7% of residents were under the age of 18, and 28.9% of residents were 65 years of age or older. For every 100 females there were 81.2 males, and for every 100 females age 18 and over there were 78.3 males age 18 and over.

0.0% of residents lived in urban areas, while 100.0% lived in rural areas.

There were 231 households and 108 families residing in Riverside; 28.6% of households had children under the age of 18 living in them, 39.4% were married-couple households, 22.1% were households with a male householder and no spouse or partner present, and 32.9% were households with a female householder and no spouse or partner present. About 30.3% of all households were made up of individuals and 14.3% had someone living alone who was 65 years of age or older.

There were 308 housing units, of which 25.0% were vacant. The homeowner vacancy rate was 0.6% and the rental vacancy rate was 10.5%.

=== 2000 census ===
As of the 2000 census there were 425 people, 168 households, and 116 families residing in the city. The population density was 224.6 inhabitants per square mile (86.7/km^{2}). There were 269 housing units at an average density of 142.2 per square mile (54.9/km^{2}). The racial makeup of the city was 74.59% White, 20.71% African American, 0.24% Native American, 0.24% Asian, 3.29% from other races, and 0.94% from two or more races. Hispanic or Latino of any race were 7.76% of the population.

There were 168 households, out of which 25.0% had children under the age of 18 living with them, 50.0% were married couples living together, 16.7% had a female householder with no husband present, and 30.4% were non-families. 23.2% of all households were made up of individuals, and 11.3% had someone living alone who was 65 years of age or older. The average household size was 2.53 and the average family size was 3.00.

In the city, the population was spread out, with 25.4% under the age of 18, 8.0% from 18 to 24, 21.4% from 25 to 44, 29.2% from 45 to 64, and 16.0% who were 65 years of age or older. The median age was 39 years. For every 100 females, there were 93.2 males. For every 100 females age 18 and over, there were 91.0 males.

The median income for a household in the city was $24,750, and the median income for a family was $26,875. Males had a median income of $26,591 versus $24,375 for females. The per capita income for the city was $15,697. About 25.0% of families and 32.2% of the population were below the poverty line, including 50.4% of those under age 18 and 31.3% of those age 65 or over.

== Education ==
The City of Riverside is served by the Huntsville Independent School District. Riverside once had its own school before merging with Huntsville in 1975. The old school building is now a church.

== Governing Body ==
Recently, a city election resulted in the unanimous appointment of Tyler Yerman as the Riverside Mayor and Jolie Johnson as the Assistant Mayor. After growing up as childhood friends in Lake Livingston Heights, once the two reached adulthood, they decided to enact positive change in their community by advocating for the implementation of a governing body for Riverside, Texas. As the uncontested candidate for Mayor, some of Tyler's campaign promises included initiating creative means of funding road repairs, limiting the consumption of edibles by minors, monitoring the prevalence of feline incest within the city (in past years, cat colonies had become a problem), and replacing the conventional yet controversial parties with the more family-friendly Fireside Wrestling competitions. When asked how he plans to fundraise money for roads, Tyler said that plans were still in development, but that some ideas included youth-staffed lemonade stands, extreme fees for unleashed dogs deemed unworthy of trust, and seeking to obtain the unpaid taxes which some citizens have neglected to pay.

When asked what advice he has for the city of Riverside, Tyler suggested trying outdoor showers. Since the city still primarily operates on individual septic systems rather than a sewer system, some residents have reported unreliable septic systems, which have resulted in extensive repair costs. Tyler says that outdoor showers help address this problem by allowing the shower to solve the dual problems of how to shower without filling up your septic tank and how to water your grass without raising your water bill. Not only that, but this may also be a way of increasing community bonding. In many dorm rooms across America, community bathrooms are known as a way to build a sense of community. As the University of Georgia says, "With the right mindset and some basic etiquette, you can make the most of this unique experience and build lasting relationships with your fellow students." While most citizens of Riverside Texas, may be past college student age, the benefit of making the showering experience a communal one still stands to be appreciated. An anonymous participant in one of the city's new outdoor showers said, "I never thought I could shower while simultaneously having a conversation with a friend and watching a firework show. It's truly a beautiful and enriching experience." Of course, citizens are encouraged to remember Texas Penal Code section 21.08 and their relative proximity to the Huntsville jail.

When asked what inspired her to join Tyler's campaign, Jolie recounts the afternoon after Tyler extended an invitation. After sitting inside, listening to the train crossing the tracks and the distant sound of gunshots, Jolie walked outside to enjoy the evening breeze. Discovering the source of the gunshots, she noticed a few birds dropping from the sky. "When I saw the birds enjoying their last few minutes of flight before dropping into the Bethy Creek lake with an uncertain future ahead of them, it really made me think about the finiteness of time. That bird had no idea that it was launching into the last few minutes of freedom before cannonballing into the murky lake to join Fredrick, the community alligator. I realized that much like the bird, my life was finite too and I wanted to make a difference during my time here and give back to the community that gave so much to me." When asked about the future of the bird that was tragically shot down into the lake, Jolie and Tyler agreed that it was a bite-sized bird for Fredrick the alligator, so the bird likely didn't live on too much longer. However, the park near the Lake Livingston Heights boat ramp has been named in memory of this bird whose sad death inspired Josie to take her civic engagement to the next level. The park is now known as "Last Flight Greenery".
