= List of Art Deco architecture in Texas =

This is a list of buildings that are examples of the Art Deco architectural style in Texas, United States.

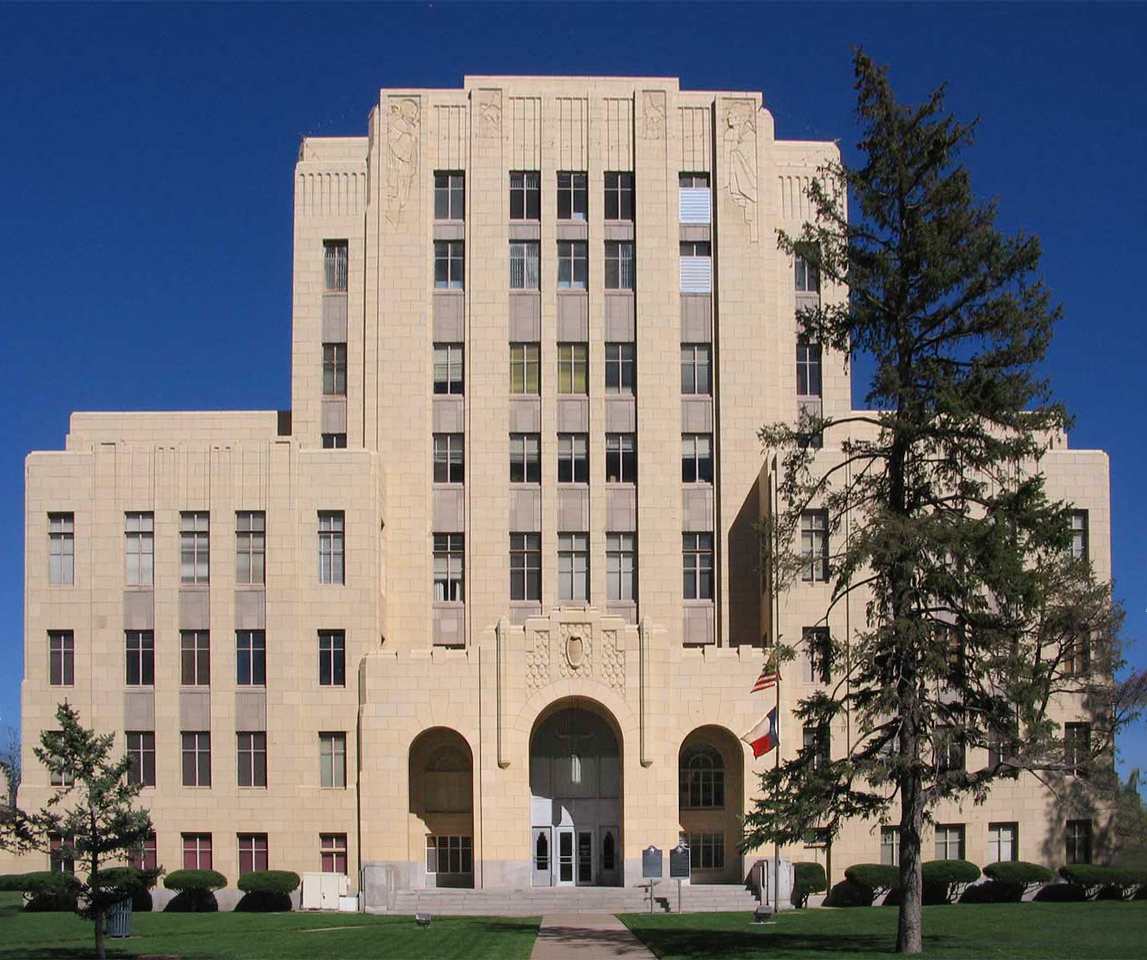
Potter County Courthouse, Amarillo

== Amarillo ==
- 2500 South Van Buren Street, Amarillo, 1935
- 2200 South Ong Street, Amarillo, 1936
- The Derrick Building (former Greyhound Depot), Amarillo, 1949
- Eddie's Napoli's Italian Restaurant, Amarillo, 1930s
- Esquire Jazz Club (former Esquire Theatre), Amarillo, 1947
- J. Marvin Jones Federal Building and United States Courthouse, Amarillo, 1939
- Kress Center City, Amarillo, 1932
- Levine's Department Store, Amarillo, 1936
- Louis H. Smith, Inc. Firestone Store, Amarillo, 1930
- Paramount Theater Building, Amarillo, 1932
- Potter County Courthouse, Amarillo, 1932
- Triangle Motel, Amarillo, 1946
- White and Kirk Department Store (now Amarillo National Bank), Amarillo, 1938

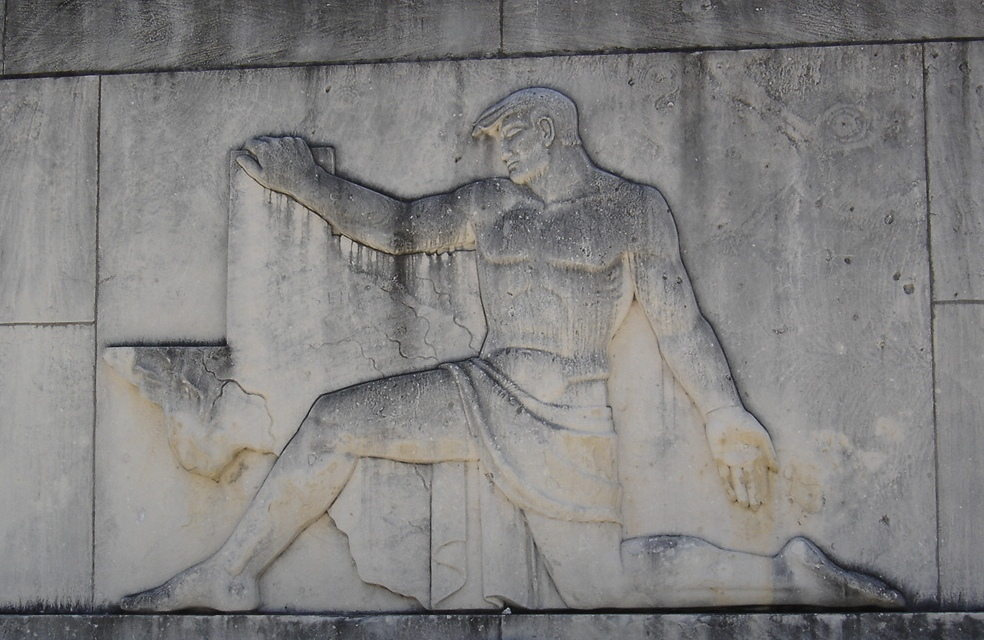
Texas Memorial Museum, Austin

== Austin ==
- 3805 Red River Street, Austin, 1947
- Austin Central Fire Station 1, Austin, 1938
- Austin Daily Tribune Building, Austin, 1941
- Brown Building, Austin, 1938
- Dewitt C. Greer State Highway Building, Austin, 1933
- Scarbrough Building, Austin, 1909 and 1931
- Seaholm Power Plant, Austin, 1928
- State Theater, Austin, 1935
- Texas Memorial Museum, Austin, 1936–1939
- Travis County Courthouse, Austin, 1931
- United States Courthouse, Austin, 1936

First National Bank Building, Beaumont

== Baytown ==
- First National Bank of Goose Creek, Baytown, 1948
- Odd Fellows Hall, Baytown, 1929
- St. Joseph Catholic Church, Baytown, 1958

== Beaumont ==
- First National Bank Building, Beaumont, 1937
- Jack Brooks Federal Building, Beaumont, 1933
- Jefferson County Courthouse, Beaumont, 1931
- Kyle Building, Beaumont, 1931

== Bryan ==
- Bryan Municipal Building, Bryan, 1929
- First State Bank & Trust, Bryan, 1929
- Old Sinclair Station, Bryan, 1933

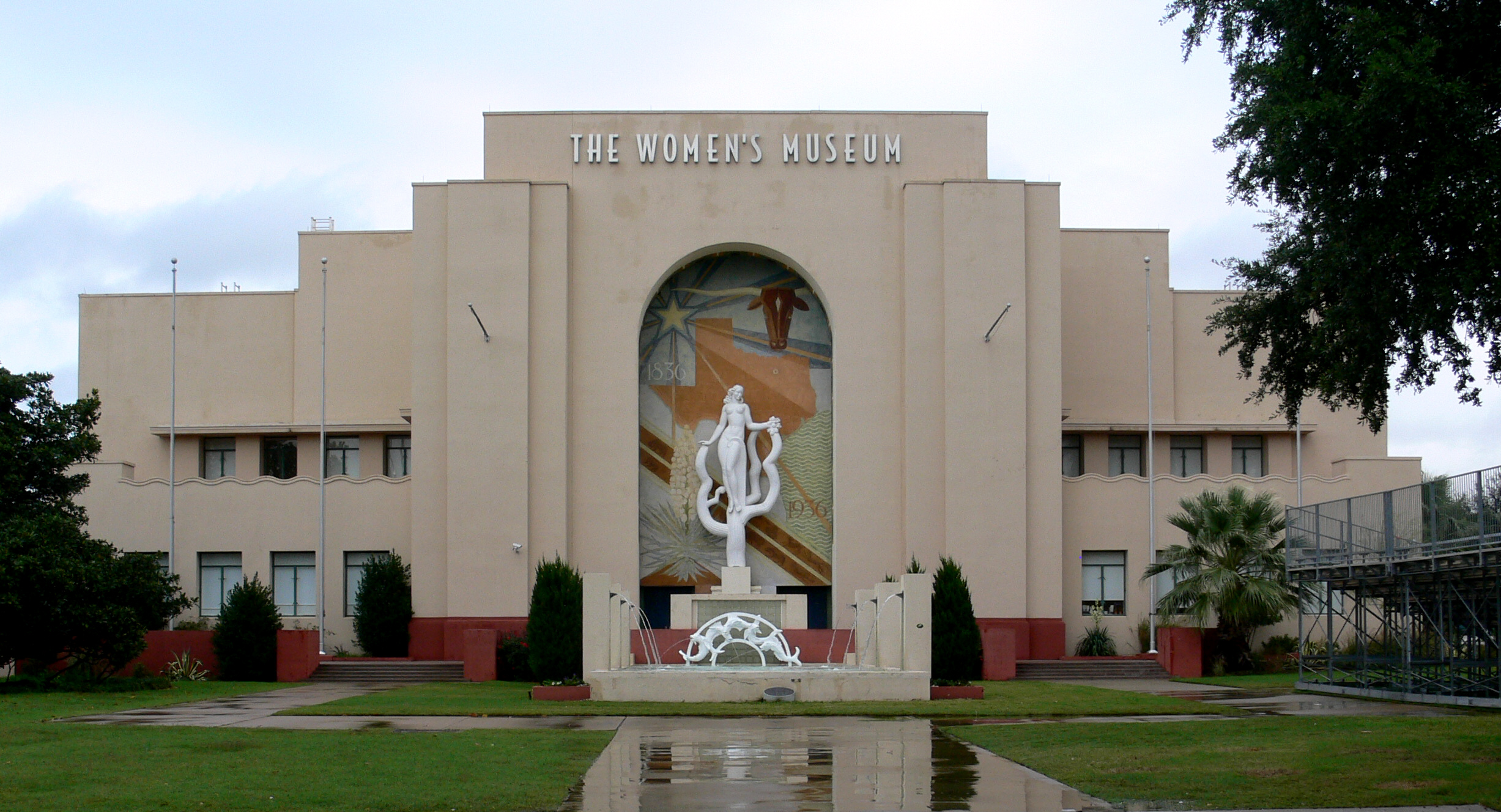
The Women's Museum, Dallas

== Dallas ==
- 508 Park Avenue, Dallas, 1929
- 6851 Gaston Avenue, Dallas, 1936
- Bath House Cultural Center, Dallas, 1930
- Cotton Bowl Stadium, Dallas, 1936
- Dallas High School Arts and Sciences Building, Dallas, 1930 and 1941
- Dallas High School Classics Building, Dallas, 1930, 1941
- Dallas Power & Light Building, Dallas, 1931
- Fair Park Station, Dallas, 1936
- Hall of State, Dallas, 1936
- John E. Mitchell Company Plant, Dallas, 1928
- Margaret B. Henderson Elementary School, Dallas, 1941
- Medical Dental Building, Dallas, 1928
- Mercantile National Bank Building, Dallas, 1942
- Texas Theatre, Dallas, 1931
- Tower Petroleum Building, Dallas, 1931
- The Women's Museum, Dallas, 1936

Plaza Hotel, El Paso

== El Paso ==
- Coldwell Elementary School, El Paso, 1930
- Fire Station 11, 331 South Santa Fe, El Paso, 1930
- O. T. Bassett Tower, El Paso, 1930
- Pershing Theater (now artist's studio), El Paso, 1940
- Plaza Hotel, El Paso, 1929
- S. H. Kress and Co. Building, El Paso, 1938
- State Theater, 108 E. San Antonio, El Paso, 1914
- United States Court House, El Paso, 1936
- Valley Theater, (former Cine Azteca), El Paso, 1948

== Fort Worth ==
- American Airways Hangar and Administration Building, Fort Worth, 1933
- Ashton Hotel, Fort Worth, 1915
- Barber's Bookstore, Fort Worth, 1910, 1935
- Blackstone Hotel, Fort Worth, 1929
- Central Fire Station No. 2, Fort Worth, 1930
- Commerce Building, Fort Worth, 1930
- Farrington Field, Fort Worth, 1939
- Fort Worth Masonic Temple, Fort Worth, 1932
- Lone Star Gas Company Building, Fort Worth, 1929
- Palace Theater Block, Fort Worth, 1996
- Public Safety and Courts Building, Fort Worth, 1938
- S. H. Kress and Co. Building, Fort Worth, 1936
- Santa Fe Freight Station, Fort Worth, 1938
- Sinclair Building, Fort Worth, 1930
- Stockyards Movie House, Fort Worth, 1930s
- T&P Station, Fort Worth, 1930
- W. T. Grant Department Store, Fort Worth, 193
- Western Union Building, Fort Worth, 1931
- Will Rogers Memorial Center, Fort Worth, 1936

== Galveston ==
- Alamo Elementary School (now storage), Galveston, 1935
- Elks Lodge, Galveston, 1940s
- Galveston Railroad Museum (former Santa Fe Building), Galveston, 1932
- Galveston United States Post Office and Courthouse, Galveston, 1937
- Graugnard's Bakery Building, Galveston, 1940
- Medical Arts Building, Galveston, 1929

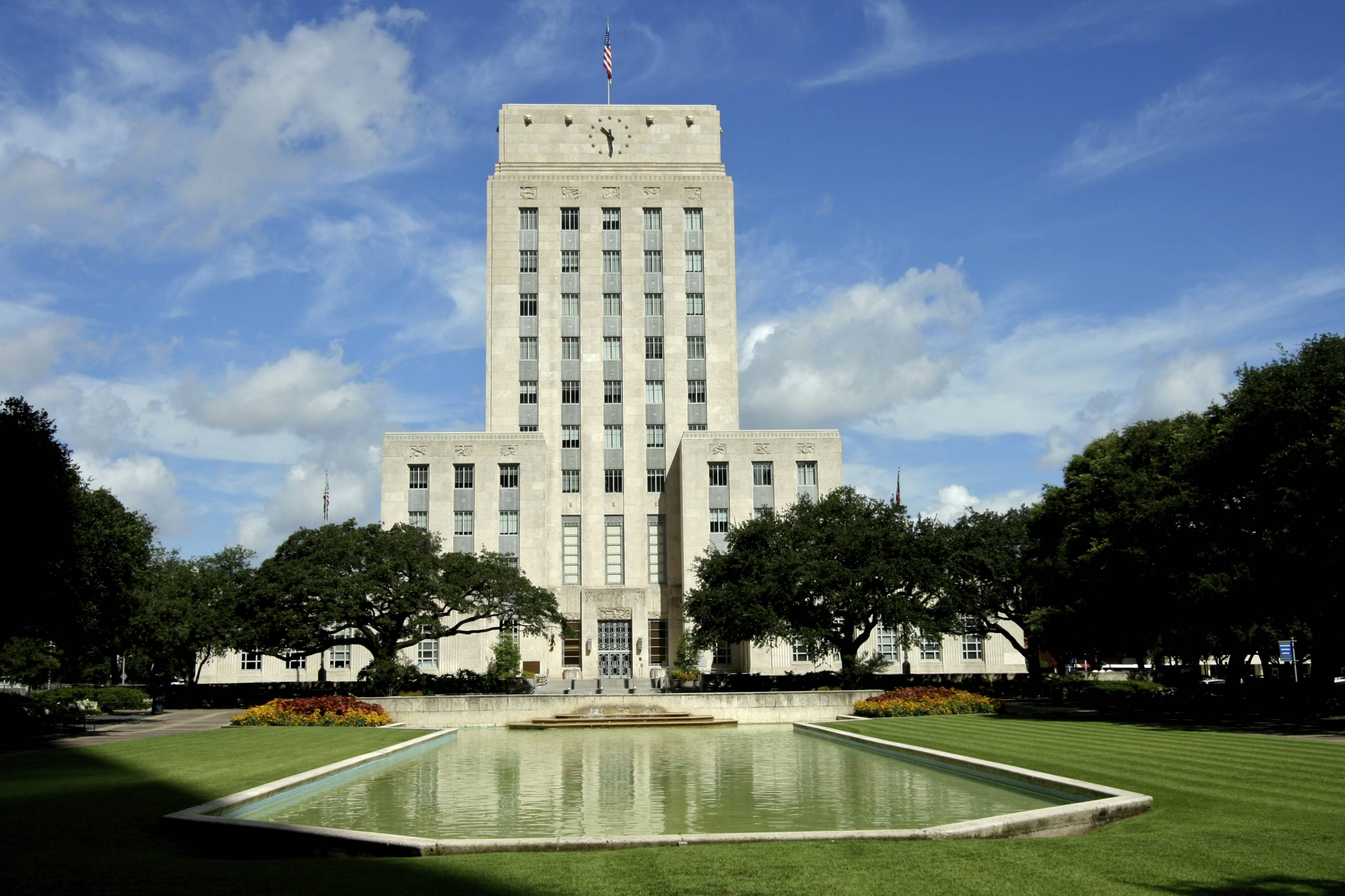
Houston City Hall, Houston

== Houston ==
- 1940 Air Terminal Museum, Houston, 1940
- 333 20th Street Building, Houston, 1952
- Alabama Theatre, Houston, 1939
- Albritton's Eats, Houston, 1945
- Almeda Court Apartments, Houston, 1939
- Bellaire Theatre, West University Place, Houston, 1949
- Brochsteins Inc, Houston, 1940, 1947
- Byrd's Department Store, Houston, 1934
- Cameron Iron Works, Houston, 1935
- City National Bank Building, Houston, 1947
- Clarke & Courts Building (now Tribeca Lofts), Houston, 1936
- Cullen Performance Hall, Houston, 1950
- Dahlgren's Cabinet Shop, Houston, 1940
- Elias Ramirez State Office Building (former Hughes Tool Company, Inc.), Houston, 1942
- Ezekiel W. Cullen Building, University of Houston, Houston, 1946–1950
- Fondren Library, Rice University, Houston, 1946
- Friendswood Junior High, Friendswood, 1939, 1949
- Gonzales Memorial Museum and Amphitheater, Gonzales, 1937
- Great Southwest Building, Houston, 1927
- Gribble Stamp & Stencil Co., Houston, 1948
- Gulf Building/JP Morgan Chase Building, Houston, 1929
- Hamman Exploration Co., Houston, 1940
- Harris County Peden Community Correction Facility, Houston, 1929
- Heights Theater, Houston, 1929
- Houston City Hall, Houston, 1938–39
- Houston Metropolitan Dance Center, Houston, 1941
- Houston National Cemetery, Houston, 1965
- James Coney Island No. 26, Houston, 1992
- JPMorgan Chase Building (former Levy Dry Goods), Houston, 1929
- L. D. Allen Residence, Houston, 1937
- Lamar High School, Houston, 1936
- Lamar-River Oaks Shopping Center, Houston, 1948
- Lawndale Art Center, Houston, 1931
- Lucian L. Lockhart Elementary School (former Congregation Beth Yeshurun Educational Building), Houston, 1949
- Mellie Esperson Building, Houston, 1941
- Merchants and Manufacturers Building, Houston, 1930
- Montrose Townhouse Lofts, Houston, 1997
- Oak Farms Dairy (now Dean Foods), Houston, 1937
- Reserve 101 Bar, Houston, 1935
- River Oaks Theatre, Houston, 1939
- Roy and Lillie Cullen Building, Baylor College of Medicine, Houston, 1948
- Roy G. Cullen Building, University of Houston, Houston, 1938–39
- Stephen F. Austin High School, Houston, 1936
- Temple of Rest, Congregation Beth Israel, Houston, 1935
- Williams Tower, Houston, 1982
- Weingarten's Big Food Market (now West End Shopping Center), Houston, 1941

== Lubbock ==
- Cactus Theater, Lubbock, 1938
- Carlock Building, Lubbock, 1930
- Lubbock County Jail, Lubbock, 1931

== San Angelo ==
- Masonic Lodge 570, San Angelo, 1931
- Princess Ice Cream Co., San Angelo, 1931
- San Angelo City Hall, San Angelo, 1928
- Texas Theatre, San Angelo, 1929

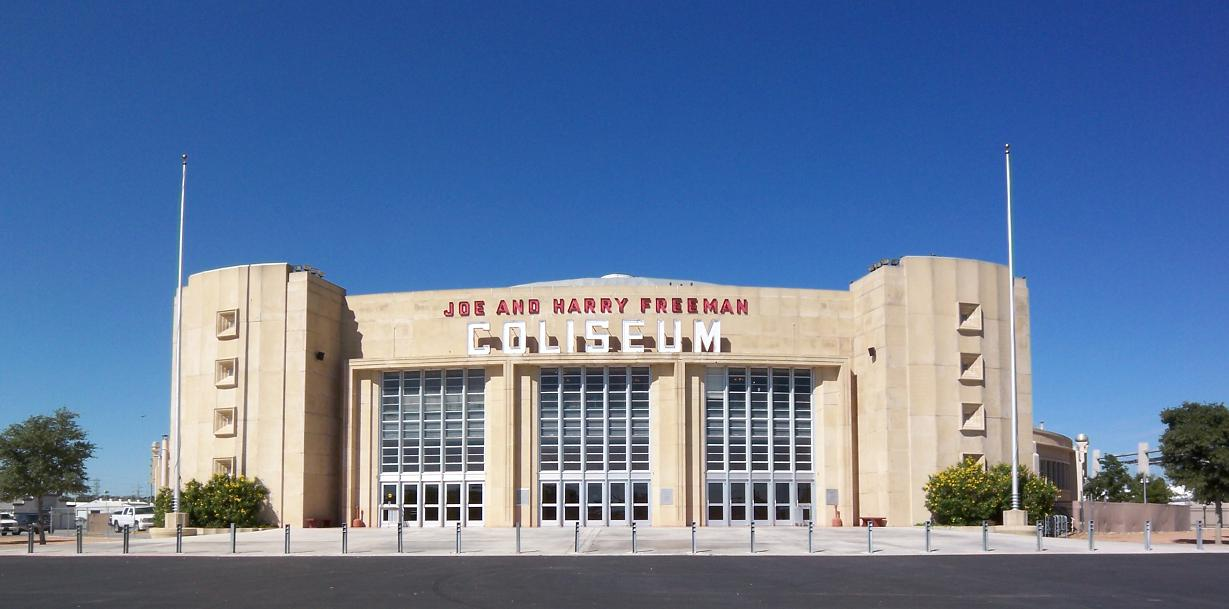
Freeman Coliseum, San Antonio

== San Antonio ==
- Alamo Stadium, San Antonio, 1940
- Freeman Coliseum, San Antonio, 1949
- George Washington Carver Library and Auditorium, San Antonio, 1930
- Lerma's Nite Club, San Antonio, 1948
- Martha Roberson Hall, San Antonio, 1939
- San Antonio Express-News Building, San Antonio, 1930

== Taylor ==
- City Hall, Taylor, 1935
- Howard Theater, Taylor, 1914
- Taylor High School Campus, Taylor, 1923
- Taylor Motor Company, Taylor, 1931

== Tyler ==
- Blackstone Building, Tyler, 1938
- Jenkins-Harvey Super Service Station and Garage, Tyler, 1929
- Liberty Hall, Tyler, 1930

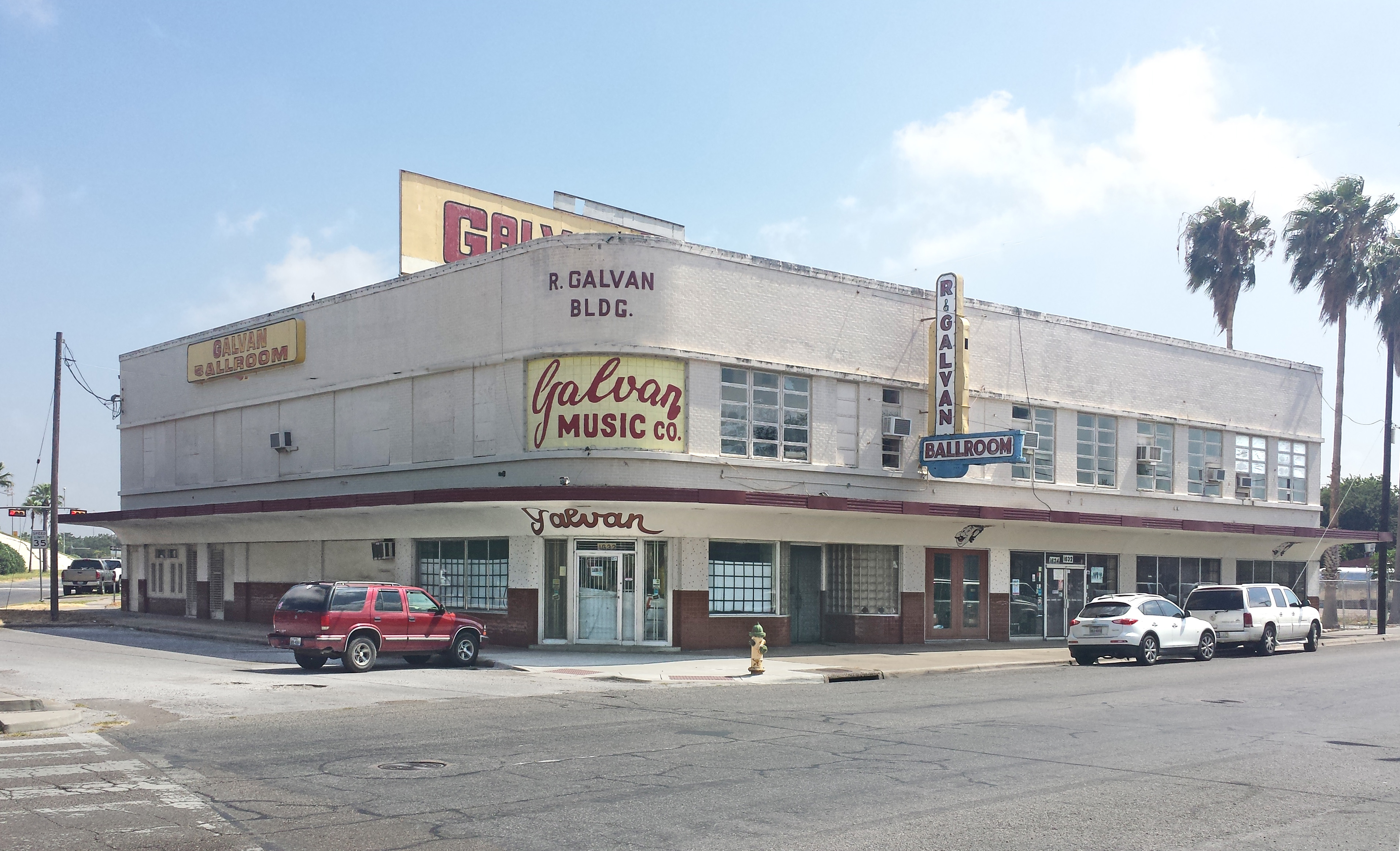
Galvan Ballroom, Corpus Christi

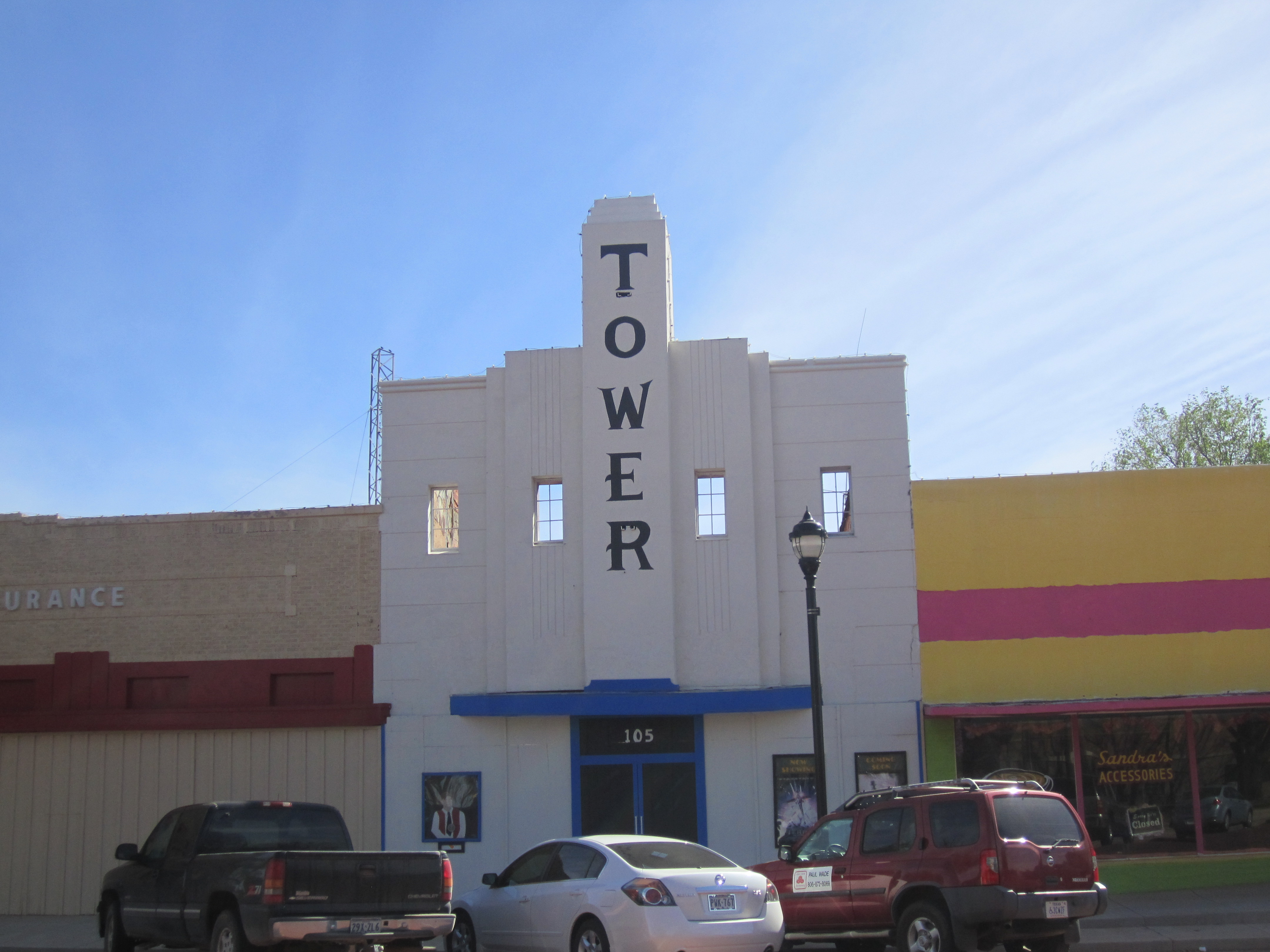
Tower Theater, Lamesa

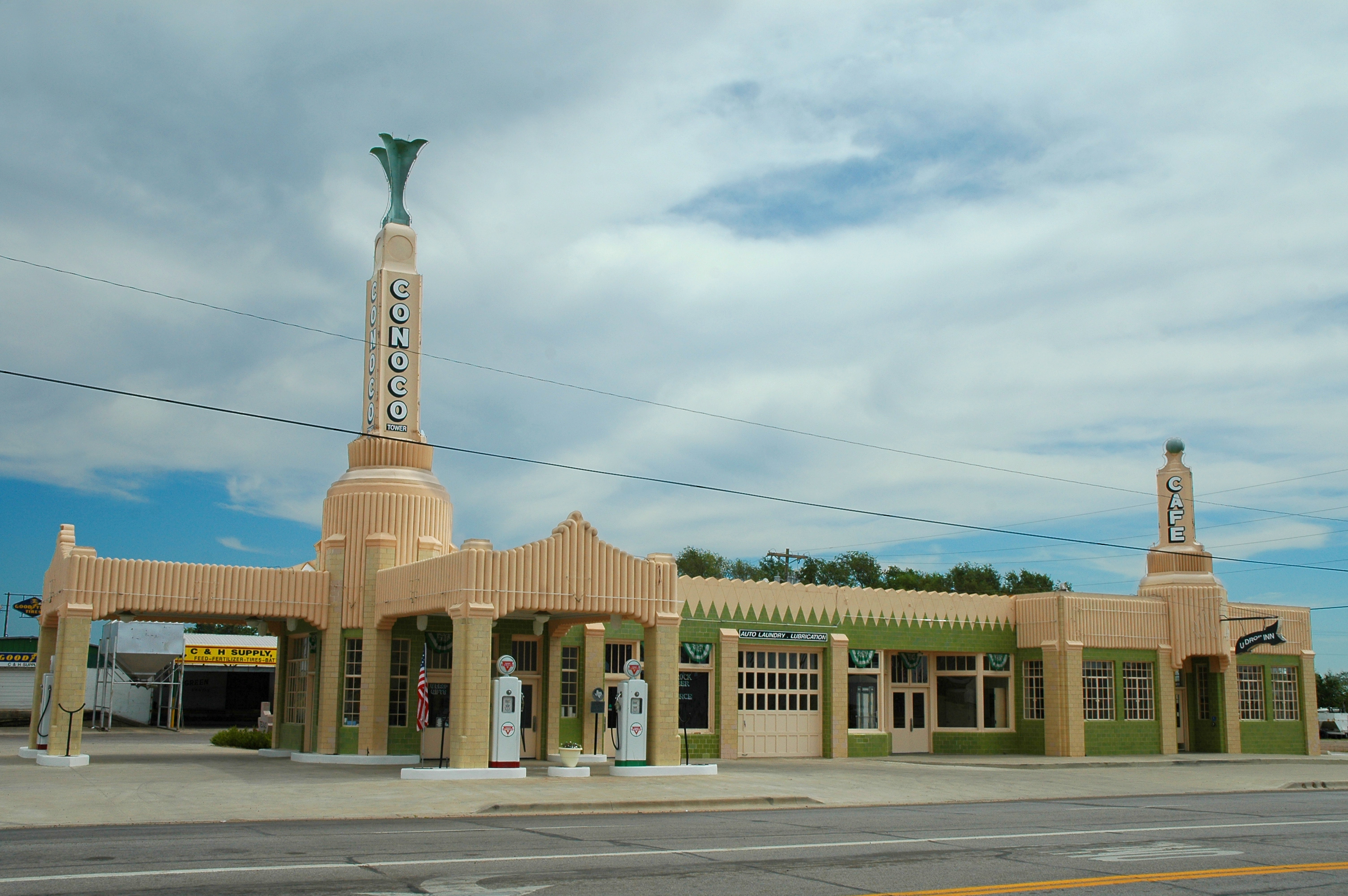
U-Drop Inn, Shamrock

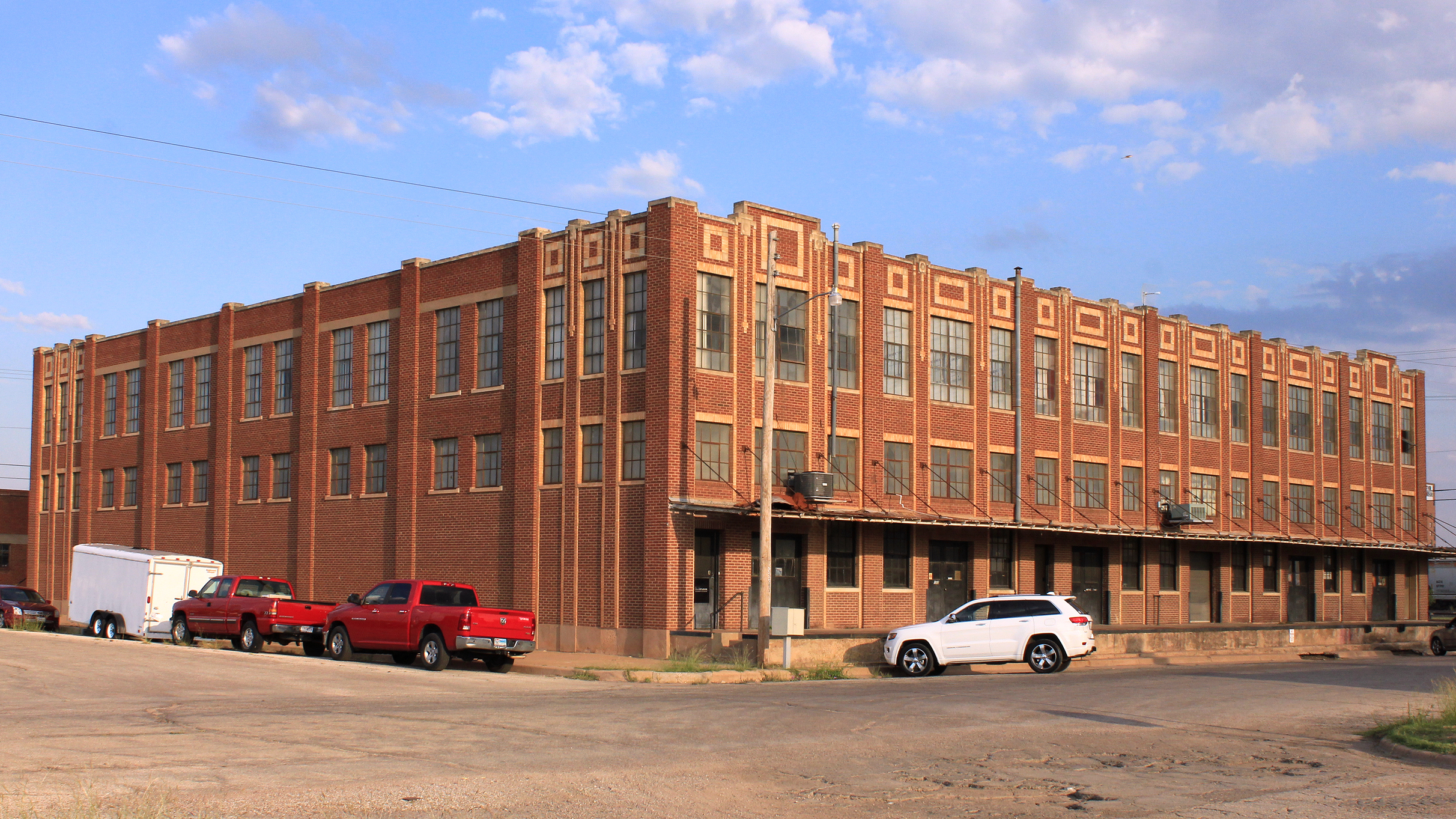
Universal Manufacturing Company Building, Abilene

== Other cities ==
- 431 North Main Street, Borger
- 3M Palace Theater, Colorado City
- Andrews County Courthouse, Andrews, 1939
- Beltonian Theatre, Belton, 1900
- Blue Bell Creameries Complex, Brenham, 1911 and 1935
- Brauntex Theatre, New Braunfels, 1942
- Brazoria County Courthouse, Angleton, 1941
- Brownlee Diner/Little Juarez Cafe, Glenrio, 1952
- Brunson Theater, Baytown, 1949
- Burnet County Courthouse, Burnet, 1937
- Butter Krust Bakery, Corpus Christi, 1938
- Celina High School, Celina, 1941
- Chambers County Courthouse, Anahuac, 1937
- Childress County Courthouse, Childress Commercial and Civic Historic District, Childress, 1939
- Cine El Rey, McAllen, 1947
- Clear View High School, Webster, 1939
- Combs–Worley Building, Pampa, 1931
- Corrigan Center (now Harris Health System), Pasadena, 1956
- Corstone Sales Company, Lufkin, 1935
- Cottle County Courthouse, Cottle County Courthouse Historic District, Paducah, 1930
- Crim Theatre, Kilgore, 1938
- Delta County Courthouse, Cooper, 1941
- Edna Theatre, Edna, 1950
- Esquire Theater, Carthage, 1949
- Fannin County Courthouse, Bonham, 1889
- Federal Building, Abilene, 1936
- Fine Arts Theatre (former Texas Theatre), Denton, 1935
- Galvan Ballroom, Corpus Christi, 1950
- Garmon Theatre, Rio Grande City, 1940s
- Graham Post Office, Graham, 1935–1939
- Gregg County Courthouse, Longview, 1932
- Hachar's Department Store, Laredo, 1942
- Hall Furniture Building, Sherman, 1936
- Hamilton County Jail (now Hamilton County Historical Museum), Hamilton, 1938
- Hansford County Courthouse, Spearman, 1931
- Higginbotham–Bartlett Co., Post, 1940s
- Hollingsworth Ford Auto Showroom, Harlingen, 1930
- Hotel Faust, New Braunfels, 1929
- Hotel McCartney, Texarkana, 1929
- Hotel Marshall, Marshall, 1929
- Houston County Courthouse, Crockett, 1938
- J. P. Lenoir Elementary, Donna, 1925
- Jacksonville Post Office, Jacksonville, 1933
- La Salle County Courthouse, Cotulla, 1931
- Lan-Tex Theatre, Llano, 1927
- Lance Theatre, Rotan
- Liberty County Courthouse, Liberty, 1931
- Loving County Courthouse, Mentone, 1935
- Masonic Lodge, Grandfalls, 1930s or 1940s
- Maverick County Jail, Eagle Pass, 1949
- Menard County Courthouse, Menard, 1931
- Morley Theatre, Borger, 1947
- National Theater, Graham, 1941
- Nocona Athletic Goods Company, Nocona, 1925
- Orange County Courthouse, Orange, 1937
- Palace Theater, Childress Commercial and Civic Historic District, Childress, 1937
- Palace Theatre (former Marfa Opera House), Marfa
- Palace Theater, Seguin, 1938
- Paris Community Theatre (former Palace Theatre), Paris, 1926
- Pearland School (now Alvin Community College – Pearland Campus), Pearland, 1945
- People's National Bank Building, Tyler, 1932
- Phipps Memorial, Waco, 1939
- Pines Theater, Lufkin, 1925
- Plainview Hardware Company Building, Perryton, 1930
- Plaza Arts Center, Carrollton, 1949
- Plaza Theatre, Garland, 1941
- Plaza Theatre, Laredo, 1946
- Randolph Air Force Base Administration Building, Universal City, 1931
- Refugio County Courthouse, Refugio, 1917 and 1951
- Rialto Theater, Alice, 1940
- Rialto Theater, Beeville, 1936
- Rialto Theater, Three Rivers, 1948
- Rig Theater, Wink, 1928
- Rio Grande Telephone Company, Brownsville, 1931
- San Jacinto Monument, Harris County, 1939
- Settles Hotel, Big Spring, 1930
- South County Office Building, Port Arthur, 1936
- Tarver Abstract Company Building (former First National Bank), Liberty, 1932
- Texas State Bank, Alice, 1912 and 1940
- Texaco Station, Glenrio, 1950
- Texas Theater, Ballinger, 1928
- Texas Theatre, McGregor, 1912
- Texas Theatre, Waxahachie, 1914 and 1927
- Tower Theatre, Lamesa, 1930s
- U-Drop Inn, Shamrock, 1936
- United States Post Office - Pampa Main, Pampa, 1934
- Universal Manufacturing Company Building, Abilene, 1927
- Upshur County Courthouse, Gilmer, 1937
- Uptown Theatre, Grand Prairie, 1950
- Van Zandt County Courthouse, Canton, 1937
- Vernon Plaza Theatre, Vernon, 1953
- W. R. Banks Library, Prairie View, 1946
- Waggoner Ranch, Vernon, 1923
- Washington County Courthouse, Brenham, 1939

== See also ==
- List of Art Deco architecture
- List of Art Deco architecture in the United States
