= Liberty County Courthouse =

Liberty County Courthouse may refer to:

- Liberty County Courthouse (Florida), Bristol, Florida
- Liberty County Courthouse (Georgia), Hinesville, Georgia
- Liberty County Courthouse (Texas), Liberty, Texas, listed on the National Register of Historic Places
