= National Register of Historic Places listings in Brazos County, Texas =

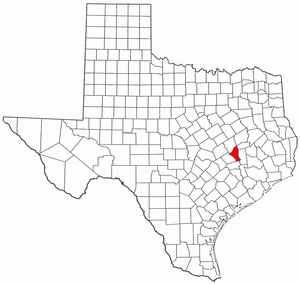
Location of Brazos County in Texas

This is a list of the National Register of Historic Places listings in Brazos County, Texas.

This is intended to be a complete list of properties and districts listed on the National Register of Historic Places in Brazos County, Texas. There are three districts and 44 individual properties listed on the National Register in the county along with one formerly listed property. Five individually listed properties are Recorded Texas Historic Landmarks including one that is also a State Antiquities Landmark. One district contains several more Recorded Texas Historic Landmarks.

This National Park Service list is complete through NPS recent listings posted January 9, 2026.

== Current listings ==
The locations of National Register properties and districts may be seen in a mapping service provided.

	Name on the Register	Image	Date listed	Location	City or town	Description
1	Allen Academy Memorial Hall		September 25, 1987 (#87001603)	1100 blk. of Ursuline; 30°40′35″N 96°21′43″W	Bryan	Historic Resources of Bryan MRA
2	Allen Block	Allen Block	September 25, 1987 (#87001604)	400-422 N. Main St. 30°40′37″N 96°22′23″W	Bryan	Historic Resources of Bryan MRA
3	R. O. Allen House-Allen Academy		September 25, 1987 (#87001605)	1120 Ursuline; 30°40′35″N 96°21′37″W	Bryan	Historic Resources of Bryan MRA
4	Armstrong House-Allen Academy		September 25, 1987 (#87001606)	1200 Ursuline; 30°40′34″N 96°21′35″W	Bryan	Historic Resources of Bryan MRA
5	R. Q. Astin House	R. Q. Astin House	September 25, 1987 (#87001607)	508 W. 26th St. 30°40′29″N 96°22′41″W	Bryan	Historic Resources of Bryan MRA
6	E. J. Blazek House	E. J. Blazek House	September 25, 1987 (#87001608)	409 W. 30th St. 30°40′13″N 96°22′39″W	Bryan	Historic Resources of Bryan MRA
7	Bryan Carnegie Library	Bryan Carnegie Library	October 27, 1976 (#76002009)	111 S. Main St. 30°40′23″N 96°22′24″W	Bryan	State Antiquities Landmark, Recorded Texas Historic Landmark
8	Bryan Compress and Warehouse	Bryan Compress and Warehouse	September 25, 1987 (#87001609)	911 N. Bryan Ave. 30°40′55″N 96°22′22″W	Bryan	Historic Resources of Bryan MRA
9	Bryan Federal Building and Post Office		December 11, 2023 (#100009605)	216 W. 26th Street; 30°40′26″N 96°22′30″W	Bryan	
10	Bryan Ice House	Bryan Ice House	September 25, 1987 (#87001610)	107 E. Martin Luther King; 30°40′48″N 96°22′20″W	Bryan	Historic Resources of Bryan MRA
11	Bryan Municipal Building	Bryan Municipal Building	February 20, 2002 (#02000116)	111 E. 27th St. 30°40′21″N 96°22′20″W	Bryan	Historic Resources of Bryan MRA
12	Cavitt House	Cavitt House	October 27, 1976 (#76002010)	713 E. 30th St. 30°40′01″N 96°22′00″W	Bryan	Recorded Texas Historic Landmark, part of East Side Historic District
13	James O. Chance House	James O. Chance House	September 25, 1987 (#87001612)	102 S. Parker Ave. 30°40′25″N 96°22′31″W	Bryan	Historic Resources of Bryan MRA
14	CSPS Lodge-Griesser Bakery	CSPS Lodge-Griesser Bakery	September 25, 1987 (#87001611)	304 N. Logan Ave. 30°40′35″N 96°22′42″W	Bryan	Historic Resources of Bryan MRA
15	Downtown Bryan Historic District		January 22, 2026 (#100012600)	Roughly bounded by 22nd Street to the north, N. Main Street/Southern Pacific Railroad /Regent Ave to the east, 28th Street to the south, Missouri Pacific Railroad to the southwest, and S. Sims Avenue/S. Sterling Avenue/the alley between N. Bryan Avenue an 30°40′29″N 96°22′28″W	Bryan	
16	East Side Historic District	East Side Historic District	September 25, 1987 (#87001613)	Roughly bounded by Houston, E. 29th, Haswell, and E. 30th Sts. 30°40′06″N 96°22′03″W	Bryan	Includes Recorded Texas Historic Landmarks; Historic Resources of Bryan MRA
17	Eugene Edge House	Eugene Edge House	September 25, 1987 (#87001614)	609 S. Ennis Ave. 30°39′54″N 96°21′57″W	Bryan	Recorded Texas Historic Landmark; Historic Resources of Bryan MRA
18	English-Dansby House	English-Dansby House	September 25, 1987 (#87001615)	204 W. 28th St. 30°40′20″N 96°22′30″W	Bryan	Historic Resources of Bryan MRA
19	English-Poindexter House	English-Poindexter House	September 25, 1987 (#87001616)	206 W. 28th St. 30°40′20″N 96°22′30″W	Bryan	Historic Resources of Bryan MRA
20	First National Bank and Trust Building	First National Bank and Trust Building	September 25, 1987 (#87001618)	120 N. Main St. 30°40′28″N 96°22′24″W	Bryan	Historic Resources of Bryan MRA
21	First State Bank and Trust Building	First State Bank and Trust Building	September 25, 1987 (#87001619)	100 W. 25th St. 30°40′29″N 96°22′25″W	Bryan	Historic Resources of Bryan MRA
22	Walter J. Higgs House	Walter J. Higgs House	September 25, 1987 (#87001620)	609 N. Tabor Ave. 30°40′44″N 96°22′17″W	Bryan	Historic Resources of Bryan MRA
23	House at 109 N. Sterling	House at 109 N. Sterling	September 25, 1987 (#87001623)	109 N. Sterling Ave. 30°40′30″N 96°22′37″W	Bryan	Historic Resources of Bryan MRA
24	House at 1401 Baker	House at 1401 Baker	September 25, 1987 (#87001621)	1401 Baker Ave. 30°40′16″N 96°21′58″W	Bryan	Historic Resources of Bryan MRA
25	House at 407 N. Parker		September 25, 1987 (#87001624)	407 N. Parker Ave. 30°40′39″N 96°22′28″W	Bryan	Historic Resources of Bryan MRA; Demolished or moved
26	House at 600 N. Washington	House at 600 N. Washington	September 25, 1987 (#87001626)	600 N. Washington Ave. 30°40′42″N 96°22′15″W	Bryan	Historic Resources of Bryan MRA
27	House at 603 E. Thirty-first	House at 603 E. Thirty-first	September 25, 1987 (#87001627)	603 E. 31st St. 30°39′58″N 96°22′08″W	Bryan	Historic Resources of Bryan MRA
28	House at 604 E. Twenty-seventh	House at 604 E. Twenty-seventh	September 25, 1987 (#87001629)	604 E. 27th 30°40′20″N 96°22′03″W	Bryan	Historic Resources of Bryan MRA
29	Humpty Dumpty Store	Humpty Dumpty Store	September 25, 1987 (#87001631)	218 N. Bryan Ave. 30°40′32″N 96°22′26″W	Bryan	Historic Resources of Bryan MRA
30	Edward J. Jenkins House	Edward J. Jenkins House	September 25, 1987 (#87001633)	607 E. 27th St. 30°40′19″N 96°22′03″W	Bryan	Recorded Texas Historic Landmark; Historic Resources of Bryan MRA
31	J. M. Jones House	J. M. Jones House	September 25, 1987 (#87001634)	812 S. Ennis Ave. 30°39′47″N 96°22′07″W	Bryan	Historic Resources of Bryan MRA
32	E. A. Kemp House	E. A. Kemp House	September 25, 1987 (#87001636)	606 W. 17th St. 30°40′58″N 96°22′41″W	Bryan	Historic Resources of Bryan MRA
33	LaSalle Hotel	LaSalle Hotel	May 26, 2000 (#00000555)	120 S. Main St. 30°40′23″N 96°22′25″W	Bryan	Recorded Texas Historic Landmark
34	McDougal-Jones House	McDougal-Jones House	September 25, 1987 (#87001637)	600 E. 27th St. 30°40′20″N 96°22′04″W	Bryan	Historic Resources of Bryan MRA
35	Moore House	Moore House	September 25, 1987 (#87001638)	500 E. 25th St. 30°40′28″N 96°22′07″W	Bryan	Historic Resources of Bryan MRA
36	Noto House		September 25, 1987 (#87001639)	900 N. Parker Ave. 30°40′53″N 96°22′28″W	Bryan	Historic Resources of Bryan MRA
37	Dr. William Holt Oliver House	Dr. William Holt Oliver House	September 25, 1987 (#87001640)	602 W. 26th St. 30°40′28″N 96°22′43″W	Bryan	Historic Resources of Bryan MRA
38	Parker Lumber Company Complex	Parker Lumber Company Complex	September 25, 1987 (#87001641)	419 N. Main St. 30°40′38″N 96°22′21″W	Bryan	Historic Resources of Bryan MRA
39	Milton Parker House	Milton Parker House	September 25, 1987 (#87001642)	200 S. Congress St. 30°40′24″N 96°22′52″W	Bryan	Historic Resources of Bryan MRA
40	Saint Andrew's Episcopal Church	Saint Andrew's Episcopal Church	September 25, 1987 (#87001646)	217 W. 26th St. 30°40′25″N 96°22′30″W	Bryan	Historic Resources of Bryan MRA
41	Saint Anthony's Catholic Church	Saint Anthony's Catholic Church	September 25, 1987 (#87001647)	306 S. Parker Ave. 30°40′16″N 96°22′32″W	Bryan	Historic Resources of Bryan MRA
42	Sausley House	Sausley House	September 25, 1987 (#87001643)	700 N. Washington Ave. 30°40′45″N 96°22′14″W	Bryan	Historic Resources of Bryan MRA
43	Old Sinclair Station	Old Sinclair Station	September 25, 1987 (#87001644)	507 S. Texas Ave. 30°40′08″N 96°22′14″W	Bryan	Historic Resources of Bryan MRA
44	Smith-Barron House	Smith-Barron House	June 20, 1988 (#87001645)	100 S. Congress St. 30°40′27″N 96°22′51″W	Bryan	Historic Resources of Bryan MRA
45	Roy C. Stone House	Roy C. Stone House	September 25, 1987 (#87001649)	715 E. 31st St. 30°39′53″N 96°22′01″W	Bryan	Historic Resources of Bryan MRA
46	Temple Freda	Temple Freda	September 22, 1983 (#83003128)	205 S. Parker Ave. 30°40′21″N 96°22′30″W	Bryan	
47	Minnie Zulch Zimmerman House	Minnie Zulch Zimmerman House	September 25, 1987 (#87001650)	308 N. Washington Ave. 30°40′34″N 96°22′16″W	Bryan	Historic Resources of Bryan MRA

== Former listings ==
	Name on the Register	Image	Date listed	Date removed	Location	City or town	Description
1	First Baptist Church		September 25, 1987 (#87001617)	August 30, 1994	201 S Washington Ave.	Bryan	

== See also ==
- National Register of Historic Places listings in Texas
- Recorded Texas Historic Landmarks in Brazos County
