= Temple Freda (Bryan, Texas) =

- U.S. National Register of Historic Places
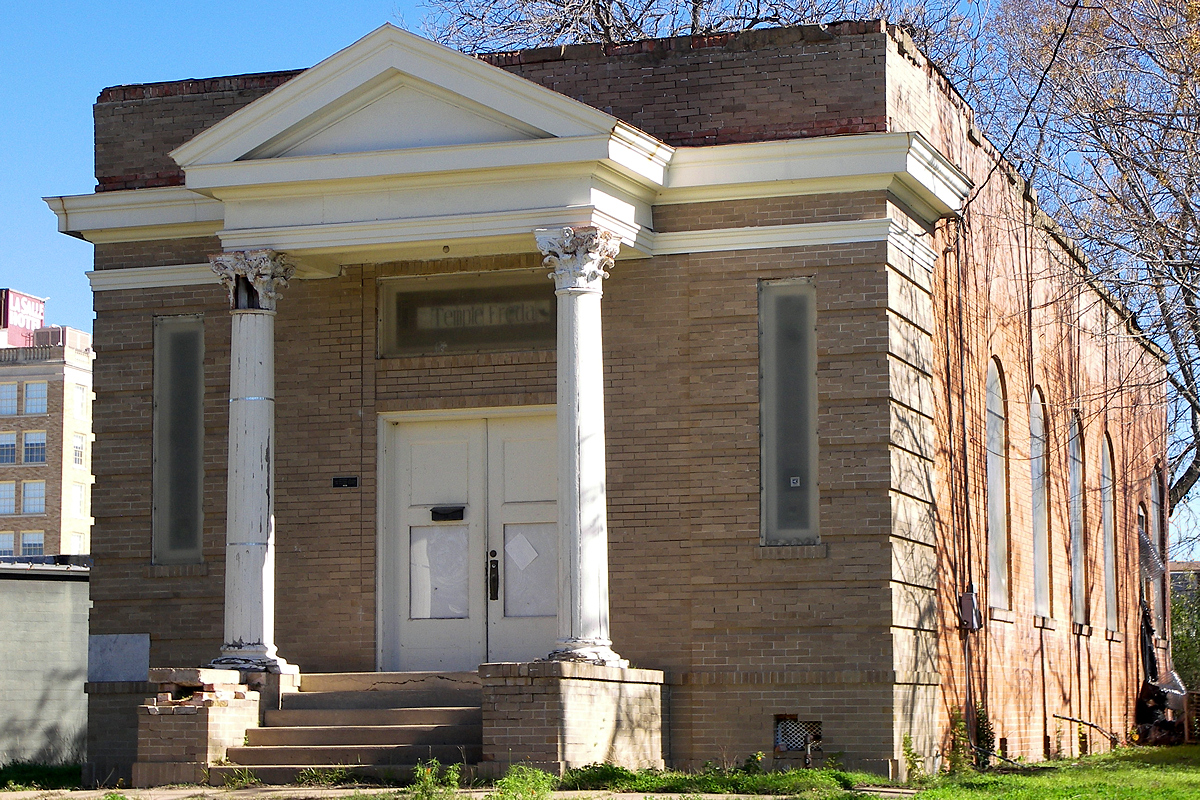
- The former synagogue, Temple Freda, in 2012

- Location within Texas Location within the United States
- Location: 205 Parker St., Bryan, Texas
- Coordinates: 30°40′20″N 96°22′29″W
- Area: less than one acre
- Built: 1912
- Architect: Green & Finger Company
- Architectural style: Classical Revival
- NRHP reference No.: 83003128
- Added to NRHP: September 22, 1983

Temple Freda, built in 1912, is a former synagogue in Bryan, Texas, in the United States. The building was added to the National Register of Historic Places on September 22, 1983.

== History ==
Temple Freda, a part of Brazos County, Texas history, is one of the three oldest religious buildings still in use in Bryan, along with St. Andrew's Episcopal Church and St. Anthony's Catholic Church. Temple Freda is named for Ethel Freda Kaczer (1860–1912). Her husband, Benjamin Kaczer (1850–1938), was president of the community when the synagogue was built. The temple is unique for a Jewish place of worship in that it is named after a woman.

Since 1982, Texas A&M University's Center of Heritage Conservation has focused on the history of Temple Freda as one of its historical projects. The temple structure is built in Greek Revival style and also exhibits Classical Revival style with Beaux-Arts architecture elements.

The building began to decline after World War II when worshippers began migrating over to the newer student-oriented Hillel synagogue in College Station. In 2013, a group of citizens from Bryan, Texas joined to restore the deteriorating building. The City of Bryan became acting custodian over the restoration project. It was determined that after restoration, the building would not be used as a religious facility rather it will be used for community activities such as weddings, small receptions, educational activities and the like.

=== Texas A&M Hillel ===
In 1958, Texas A&M Hillel opened up a building in College Station, Texas. During this period, some members of Temple Freda in Bryan, Texas left to attend services at the Hillel Foundation building in College Station. Presently, Temple Freda's Torah is under the care of Texas A&M Hillel.

=== Congregation Beth Shalom ===
In 1968 Congregation Beth Shalom in Bryan, also called the Jewish Congregation of Bryan-College Station, was formed to serve the Jewish community of the Brazos Valley. It included many former members of Temple Freda. Presently Temple Freda's Cemetery is under the care of Congregation Beth Shalom.

== Architecture project ==
Since 1982, Texas A&M University's "Center of Heritage Conservation" has focused on the history of Temple Freda as one of its historical projects. The temple structure is built in Greek Revival style and also exhibits Classical Revival style with Beaux-Arts architecture elements. Temple Freda is associated with the Jewish cemetery "Temple Freda Cemetery" and is also a part of the National Register of Historic Places of Texas.

== See also ==
- National Register of Historic Places listings in Brazos County, Texas
