= R. Q. Astin House =

Historic house in Texas, United States

- The Astin Mansion
- U.S. National Register of Historic Places
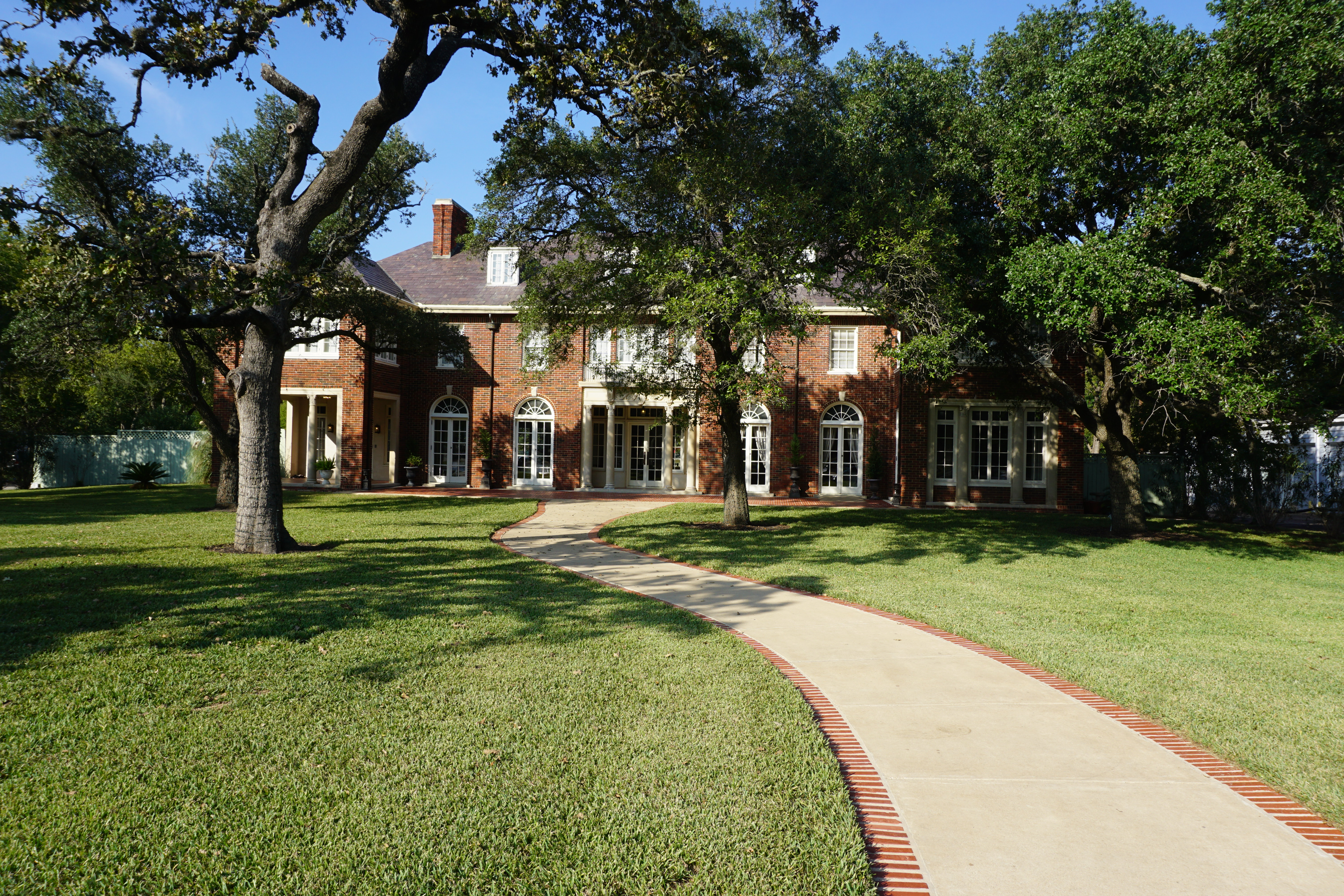
- Astin Mansion Frontal View

- Location within Texas Location within the United States
- Location: 508 W. 26th St., Bryan, Texas
- Coordinates: 30°40′27″N 96°22′40″W
- Area: less than one acre
- Built: 1921
- MPS: Bryan MRA
- NRHP reference No.: 87001607
- Added to NRHP: September 25, 1987

The Astin Mansion is a historic house located at 506 W. 26th Street, Bryan, Texas, USA. It was built in 1920 and designed in the English Georgian Revival style. It has been listed on the National Register of Historic Places since September 25, 1987.

The Astin Mansion was built by Roger Q. Astin for his wife Nina (née Heard). Roger Astin was the youngest son of James Hugh Astin, a wealthy landowner and owner of the Rivermist cotton plantation. The Astin family significantly shaped the growth of Bryan, Texas and the Brazos Valley. There are several charitable organizations in the area that bear the Astin name as a result of the philanthropy of Nina Astin.

The Astin Mansion was designed by architect Hal B. Thompson. Mr. Thompson also designed Highland Park in Dallas. The main house has 96 windows and 16 sets of French doors. The original slate roof has been maintained. Many of the interior fixtures, chandeliers and mirrors are original to the house. The overmantle was carved by Peter Mansbendel in the style of the famous English carver Grinling Gibbons. Mr. Mansbendel also carved several of the limestone and cast stone mantles. The ironwork is thought to be from Henry Potter Ironworks of Dallas. The Astin Mansion complex also includes a carriage house that has been converted into a lounge. Above it is an apartment. Additionally, behind the main house, there is a children's playhouse built by Nina Astin for her children that is a miniature of the mansion.

The Astin Mansion has been used as a Special Events Venue for upscale events since 2004.

== See also ==
- National Register of Historic Places listings in Brazos County, Texas
