= Saint Anthony's Catholic Church (Bryan, Texas) =

Historic church in Texas, United States

- U.S. National Register of Historic Places
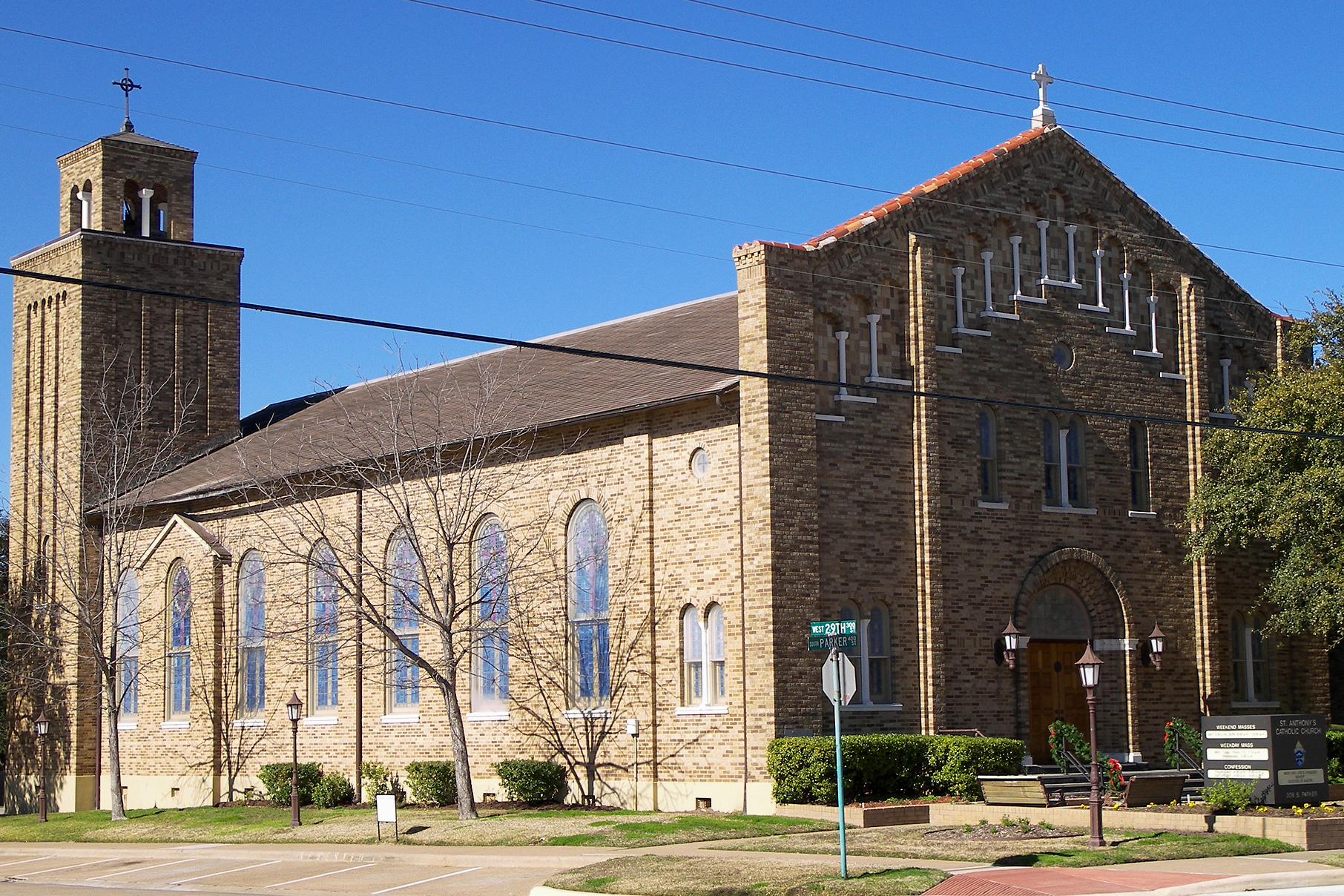
- St. Anthony's Church in 2012

- Location within Texas Location within the United States
- Location: 306 S. Parker, Bryan, Texas
- Coordinates: 30°40′16″N 96°22′32″W
- Area: less than one acre
- Built: 1927
- Architectural style: Romanesque
- MPS: Bryan MRA
- NRHP reference No.: 87001647
- Added to NRHP: September 25, 1987

Saint Anthony's Catholic Church is a historic Roman Catholic church building at 306 S. Parker in Bryan, Texas.

The Romanesque Revival-style building was constructed in 1927 and added to the National Register of Historic Places in 1987.

== See also ==
- National Register of Historic Places listings in Brazos County, Texas
