= Saint Andrew's Episcopal Church (Bryan, Texas) =

Historic church in Texas, United States

- U.S. National Register of Historic Places
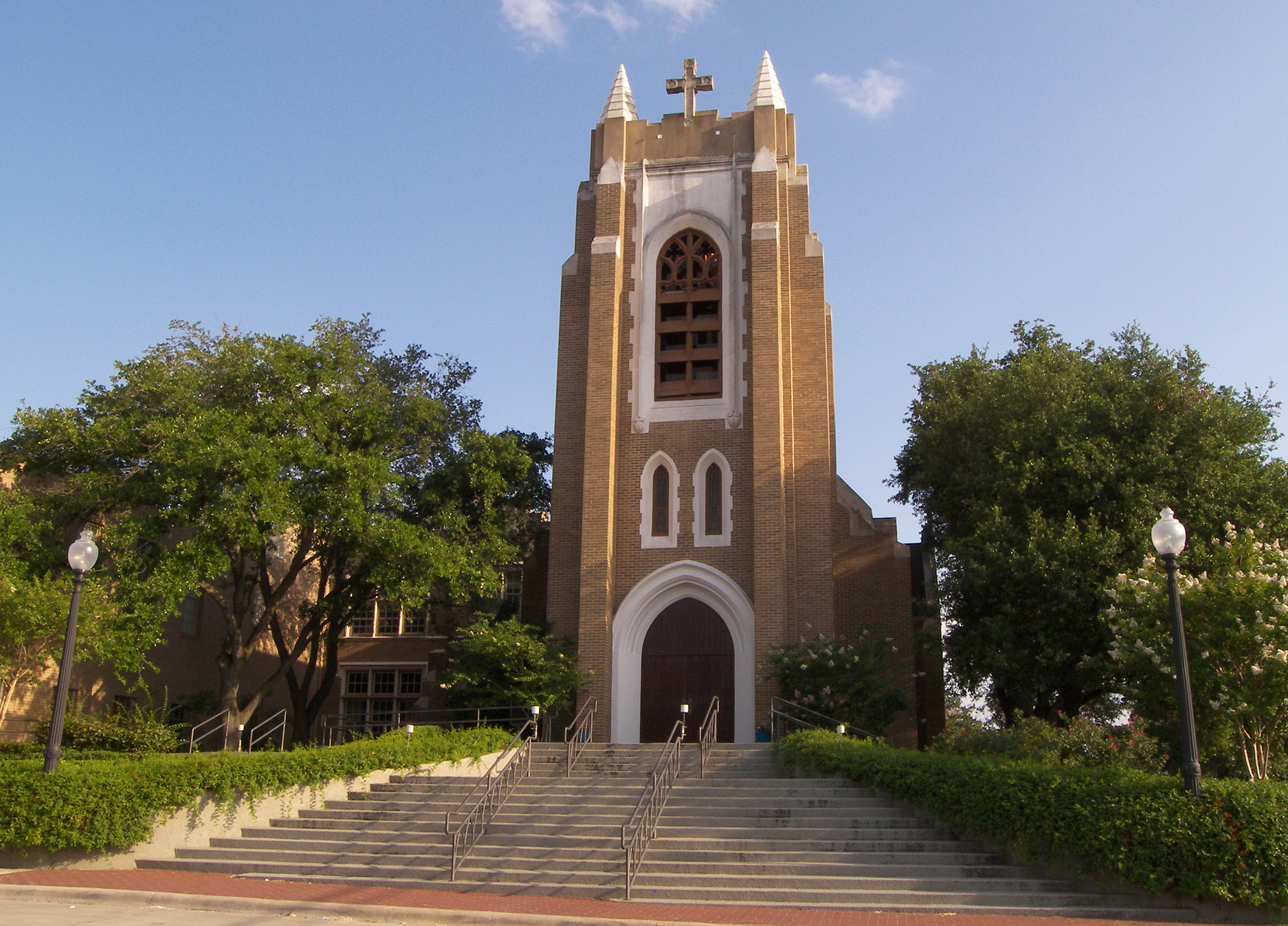
- St. Andrews Church in 2009

- Location within Texas Location within the United States
- Location: 217 W. Twenty-sixth, Bryan, Texas
- Coordinates: 30°40′25″N 96°22′29″W
- Area: less than one acre
- Built: 1914
- Architectural style: Late Gothic Revival
- MPS: Bryan MRA
- NRHP reference No.: 87001646
- Added to NRHP: September 25, 1987

Saint Andrew's Episcopal Church is a historic Episcopal church at 217 West Twenty-sixth in Bryan, Texas. It is a parish of the Episcopal Diocese of Texas.

No membership statistics were reported in 2024 national parochial reports. In 2019, the church reported 300 members; in 2023, it reported 322 members. Plate and pledge financial support reported by the church in 2024 was $525,876. Average Sunday Attendance ASA reported in 2024 was 150 persons. This was a relative decrease on ASA of 196 in 2020.

The Late Gothic Revival-style church building was constructed in 1914 and added to the National Register of Historic Places in 1987.

== See also ==
- National Register of Historic Places listings in Brazos County, Texas
