= The Women's Museum =

Museum inside Fair Park in Dallas, Texas

The Women's Museum: An Institute for the Future
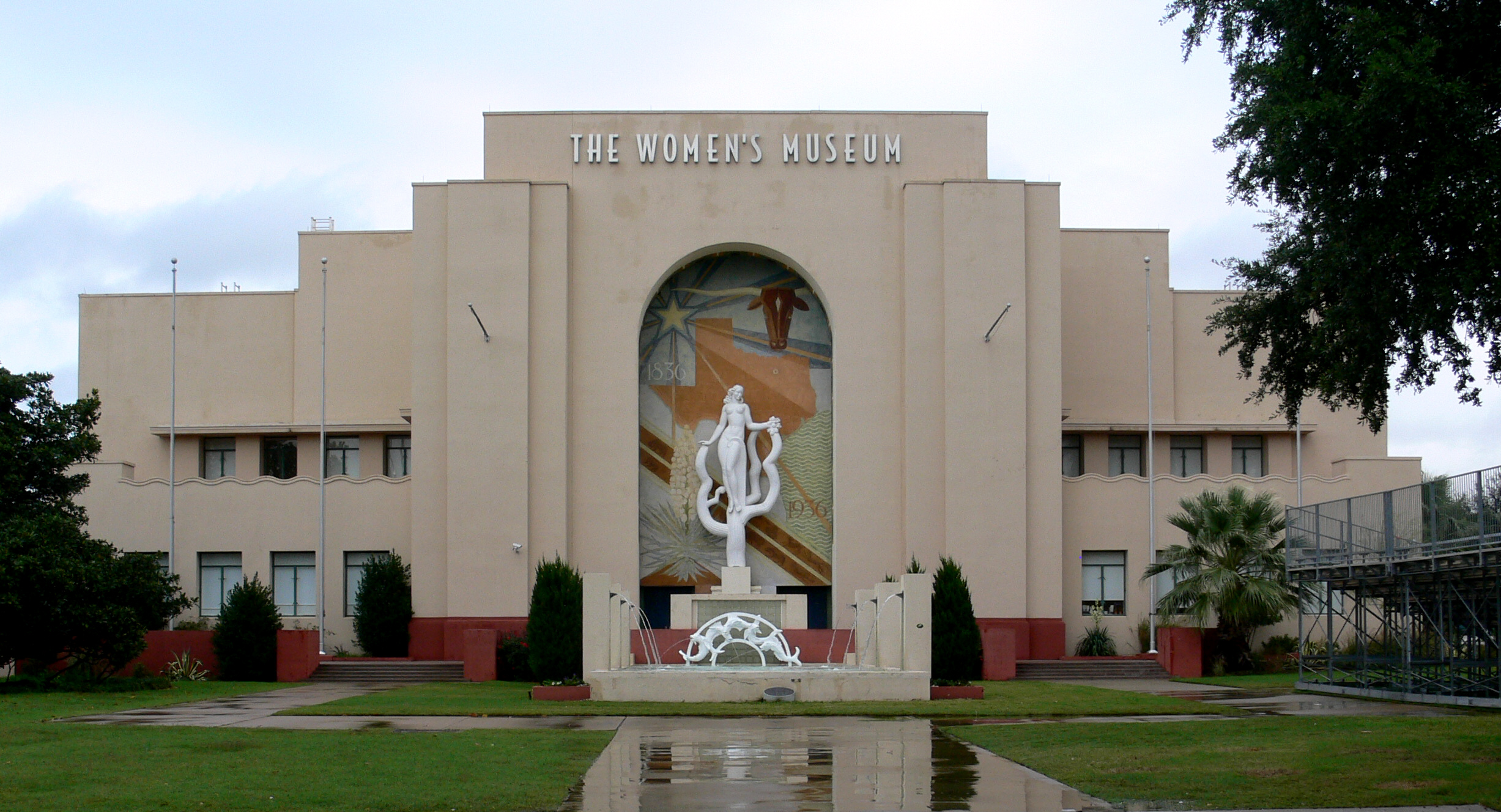
- The Women's Museum in 2009

- Location within Texas Location within the United States
- Dissolved: October 31, 2011
- Location: Dallas, Texas
- Coordinates: 32°46′58″N 96°45′54″W
- President: Cathy Bonner
- Website: The Women's Building
- Hall of Administration
- U.S. Historic district – Contributing property
- Texas State Antiquities Landmark
- Dallas Landmark Historic District; Contributing Property
- Built: 1910
- Architectural style: Spanish Romanesque, Art Deco
- Part of: Texas Centennial Exposition Buildings (1936-1937) (ID86003488)
- TSAL No.: 8200002118
- DLMKHD No.: H/33 (Fair Park)

Significant dates
- Designated CP: September 24, 1986
- Designated TSAL: January 1, 1984
- Designated DLMKHD: March 4, 1987

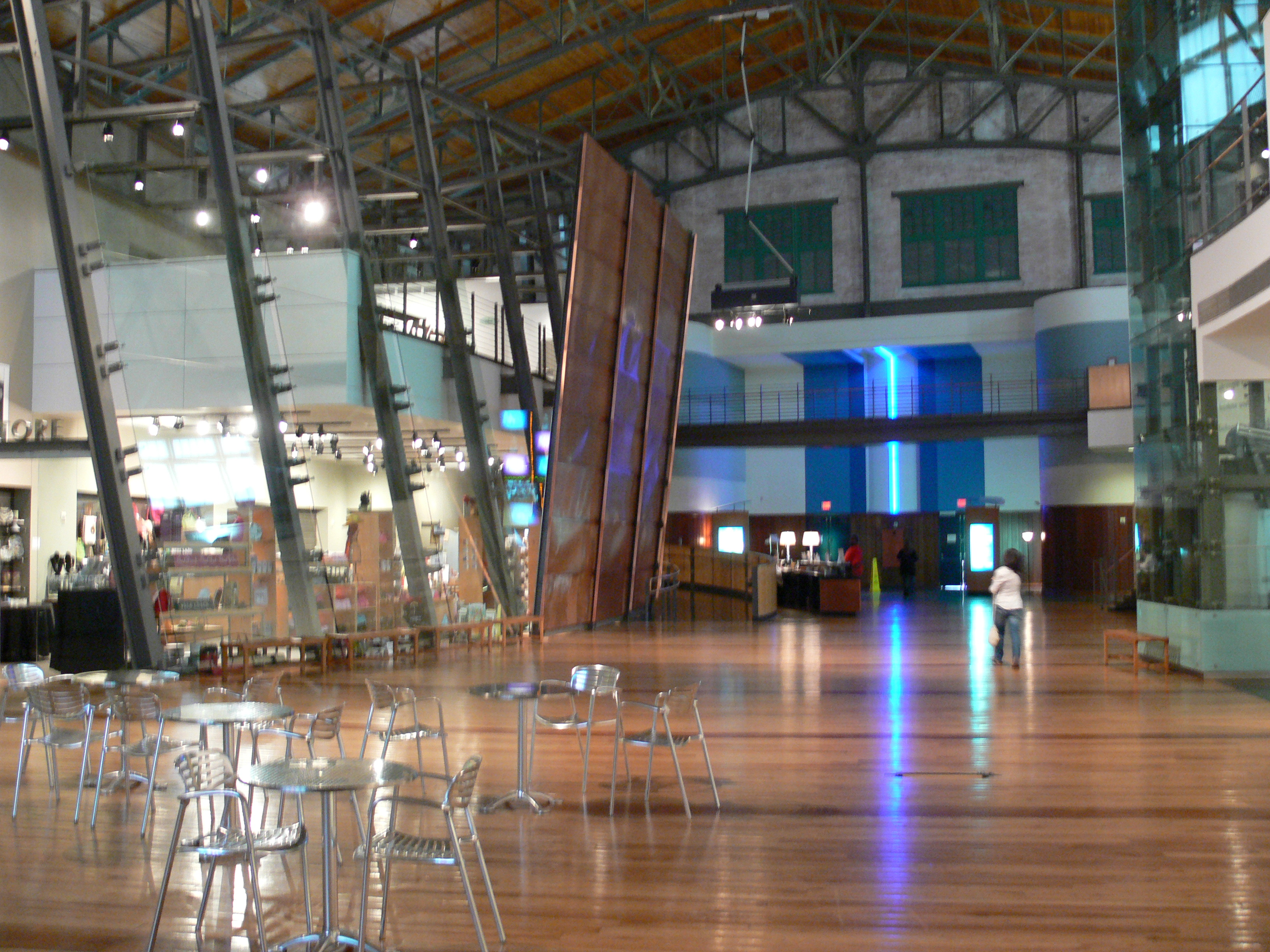
The Women's Museum

The Women's Museum: An Institute for the Future was a museum located inside Fair Park in Dallas, Texas. On October 5, 2011, the museum announced it would close on October 31, 2011, due to lack of funds.

== Foundation of Women's Resources ==
This sparked an interest in the mother to collaborate with the women's resources to investigate the nature of women's participation in the development of Texas. This resulted in Texas Women's History Project and the museum exhibit, Texas Women - A Celebration of History, which toured throughout Texas in 1980 and 1981. This display is now on permanent display at Texas Woman's University.

== See also ==
- List of Dallas Landmarks
- National Register of Historic Places listings in Dallas County, Texas
