= Rig Theater =

- U.S. National Register of Historic Places
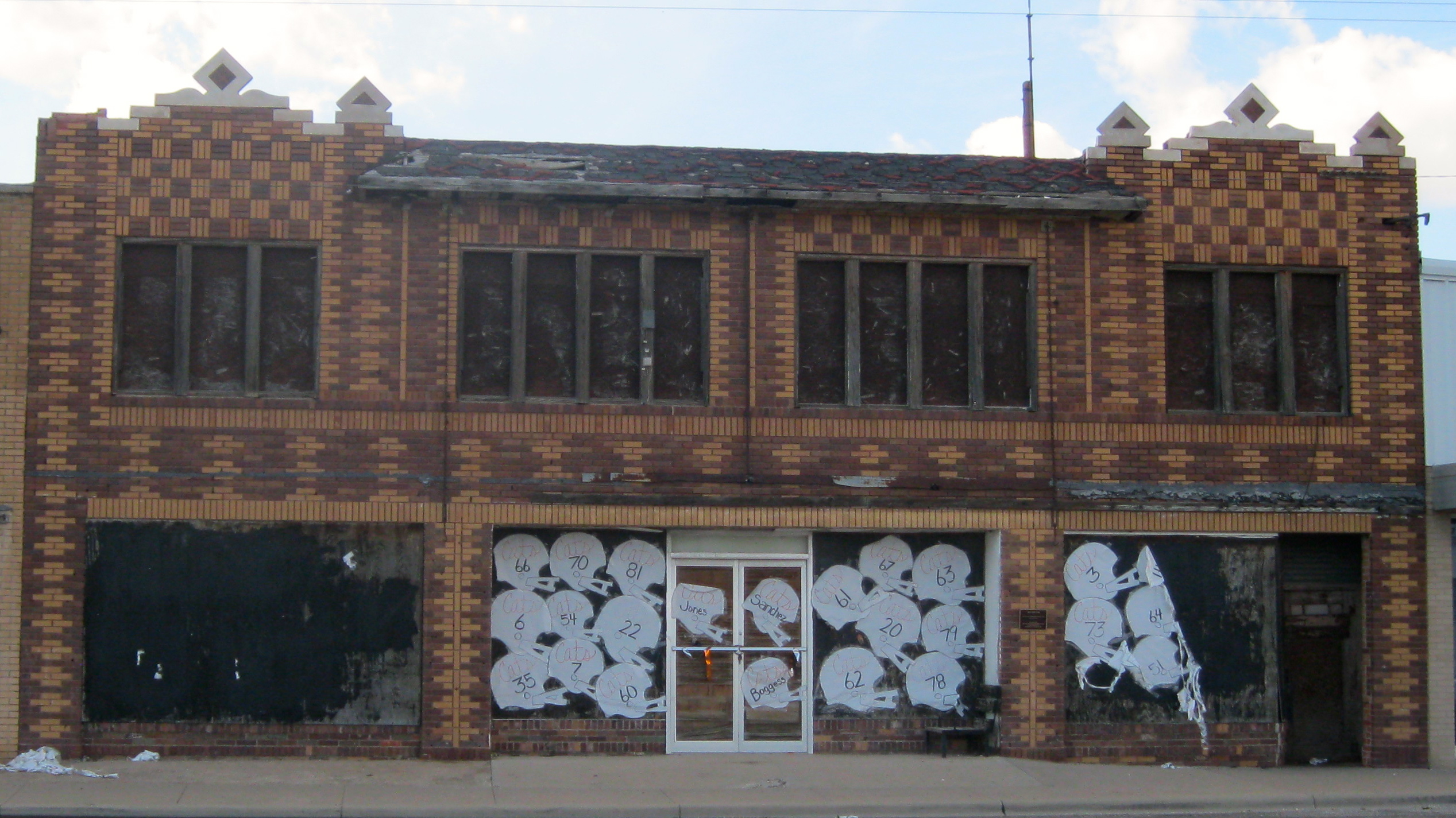

- Location within Texas Location within the United States
- Location: 213-215 E. Hendricks Blvd, Wink, Texas
- Coordinates: 31°45′20″N 103°08′46″W
- Area: less than one acre
- Built: 1928
- Built by: Griffith Amusement Co.
- Architectural style: Early Commercial
- NRHP reference No.: 03000770
- Added to NRHP: August 14, 2003

The Rig Theater is a former cinema on East Hendricks Boulevard in Wink, Texas. It was built in 1928. It was listed on the National Register of Historic Places in 2003. It had a single screen as a cinema and had a seating capacity of 605. At the time of the theater's construction it was the only building in Wink made from masonry other than the town's school.

The Rig Theater was the childhood cinema of the young singer-songwriter Roy Orbison, where he spent many hours. Orbison performed at the Rig with his early bands, the Teen Kings and the Wink Westerners. Walt Quigley, a Roy Orbison tribute artist, is raising funds to reopen the Rig Theater and to move Wink's Roy Orbison Museum into the theater's lobby. Graffiti by Orbison and his friends from 1951 was found in the stairway to the balcony in 1999, and is preserved in a display at the Roy Orbison Museum.

It is a two-part Early Commercial-style two-story building.
