= Kyle Building =

Building in Beaumont, Texas

- U.S. Historic district – Contributing property
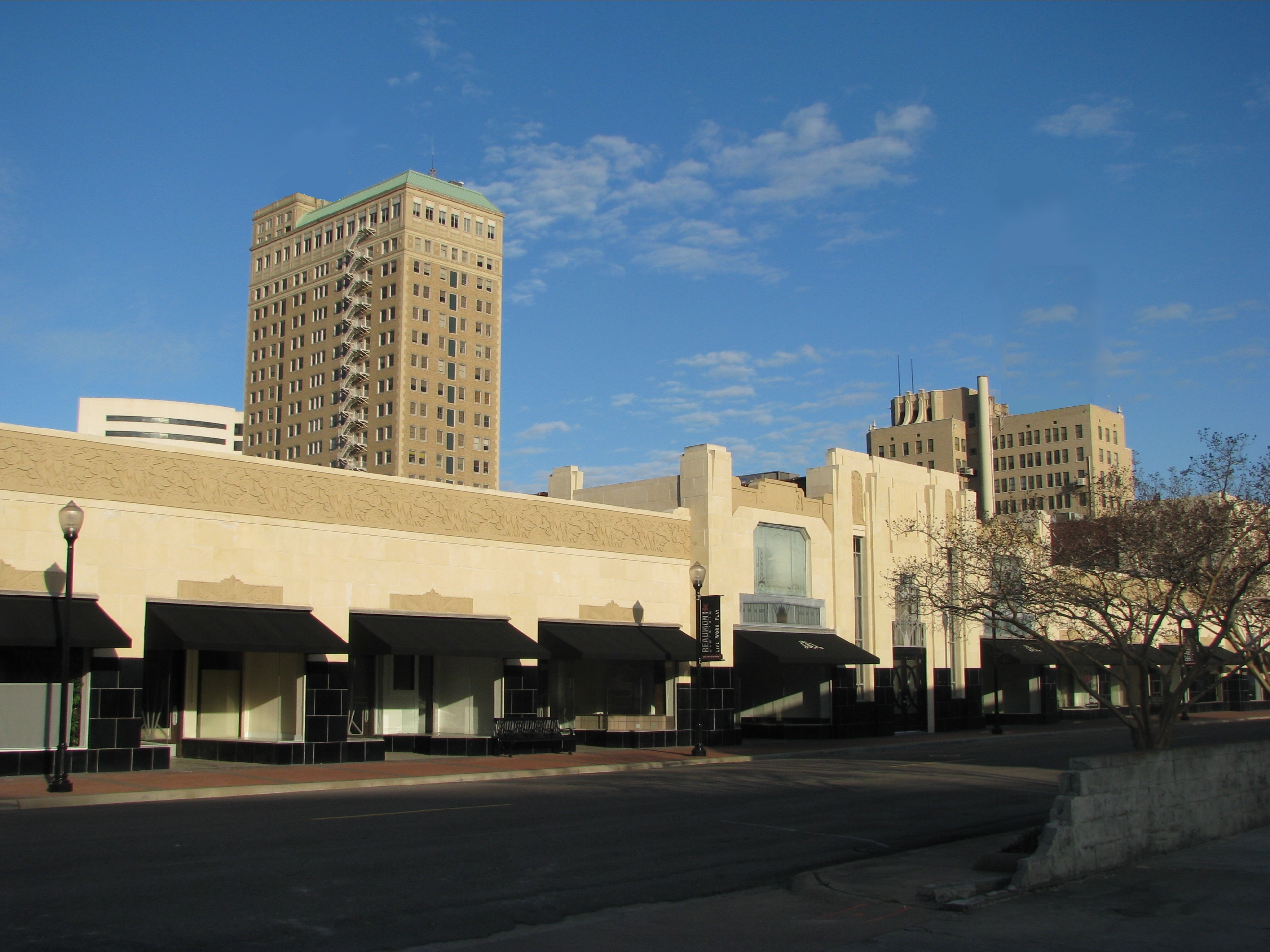
- Kyle Building in 2010

- Location within Texas Location within the United States
- Location: 215 Orleans St., Beaumont, Texas
- Coordinates: 30°05′05″N 94°06′03″W
- Area: less than one acre
- Built: 1933
- Architectural style: Art Deco
- Part of: Beaumont Commercial District (ID78002959)
- Designated CP: April 14, 1978

The Kyle Building (also known as Kyle Block) was built in 1933 in downtown Beaumont, Texas. It was designed as a retail storefront, with two-story offices at each end of the building. It is located at 215 Orleans St. The building contains 11 stores, and it is an excellent example of Zig-Zag Art Deco architecture. A contributing property to the Beaumont Historic District, it is located at the site of the former Kyle Opera house, which was demolished in 1931.

== Photo gallery ==
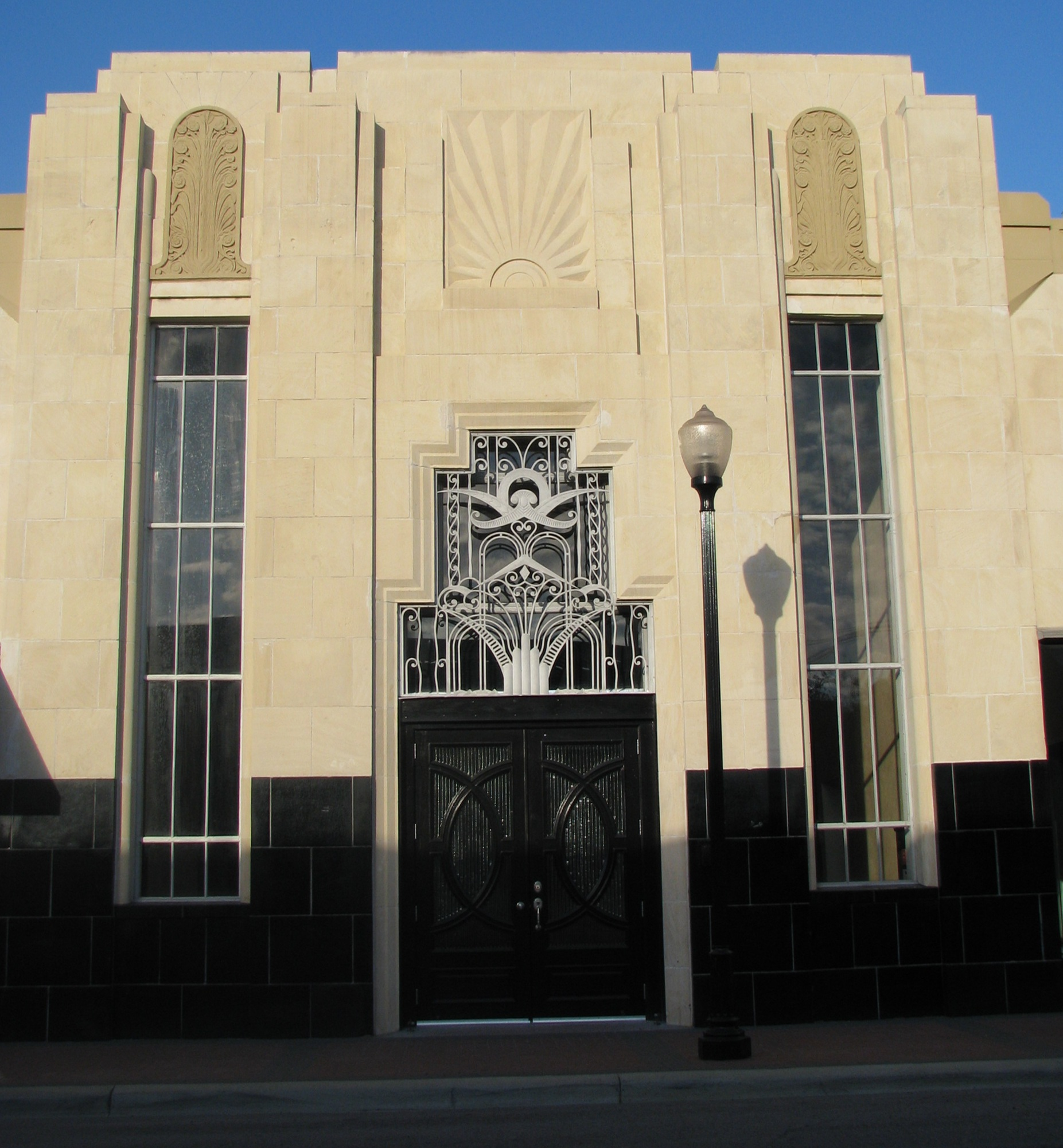
Kyle block center section and main entrance.

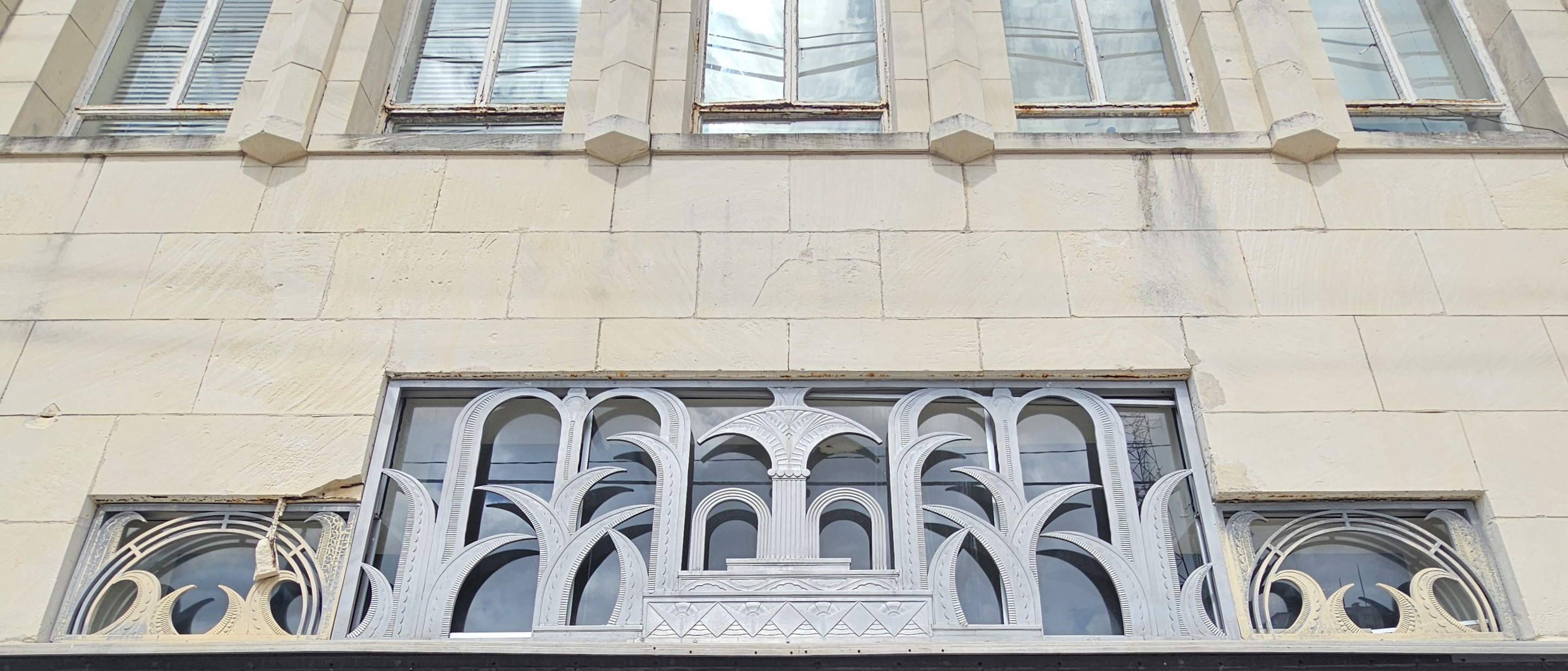
Art deco ornamentation over a window

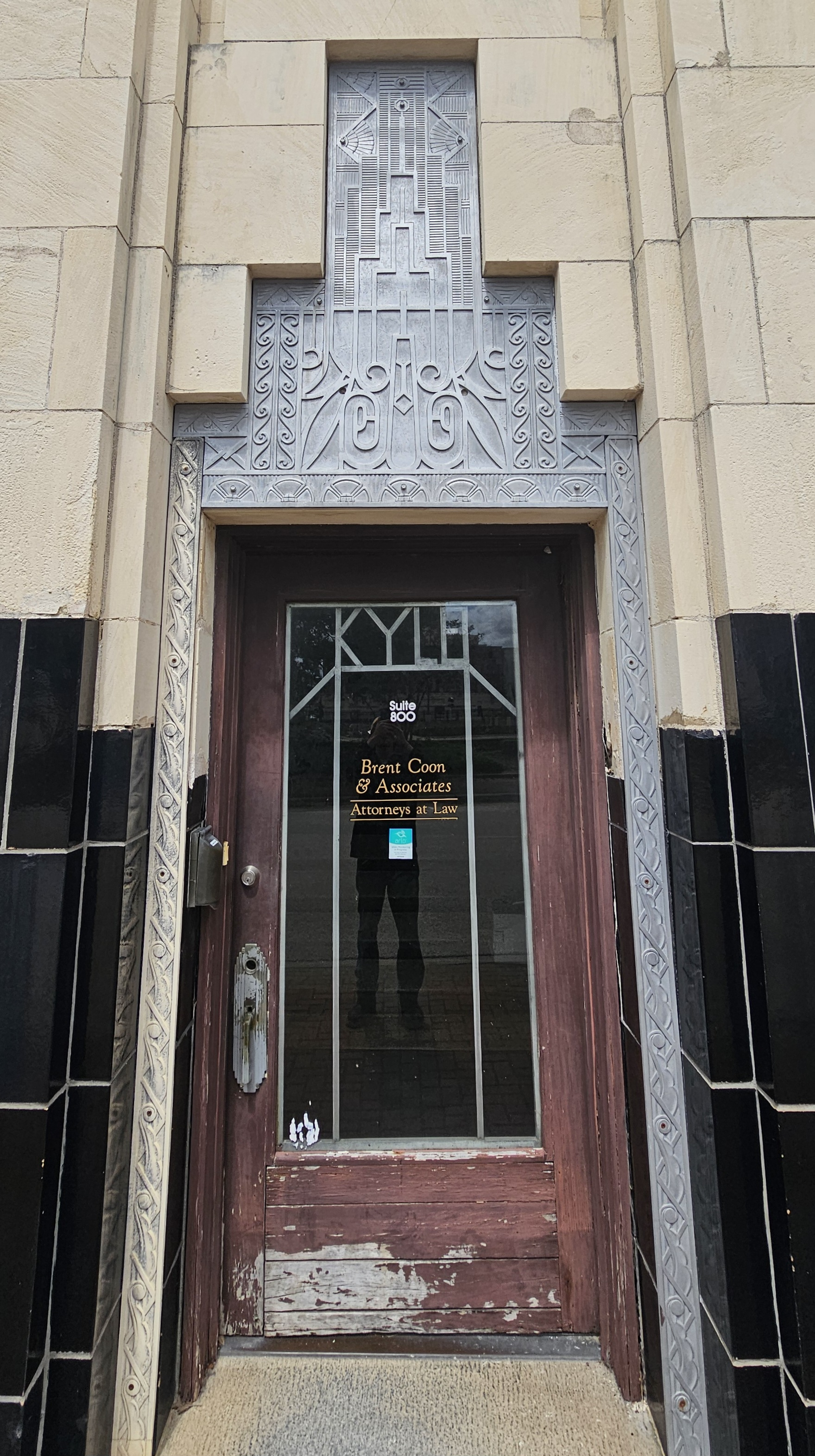
Entryway with art deco ornamentation and "KYLE" over the door

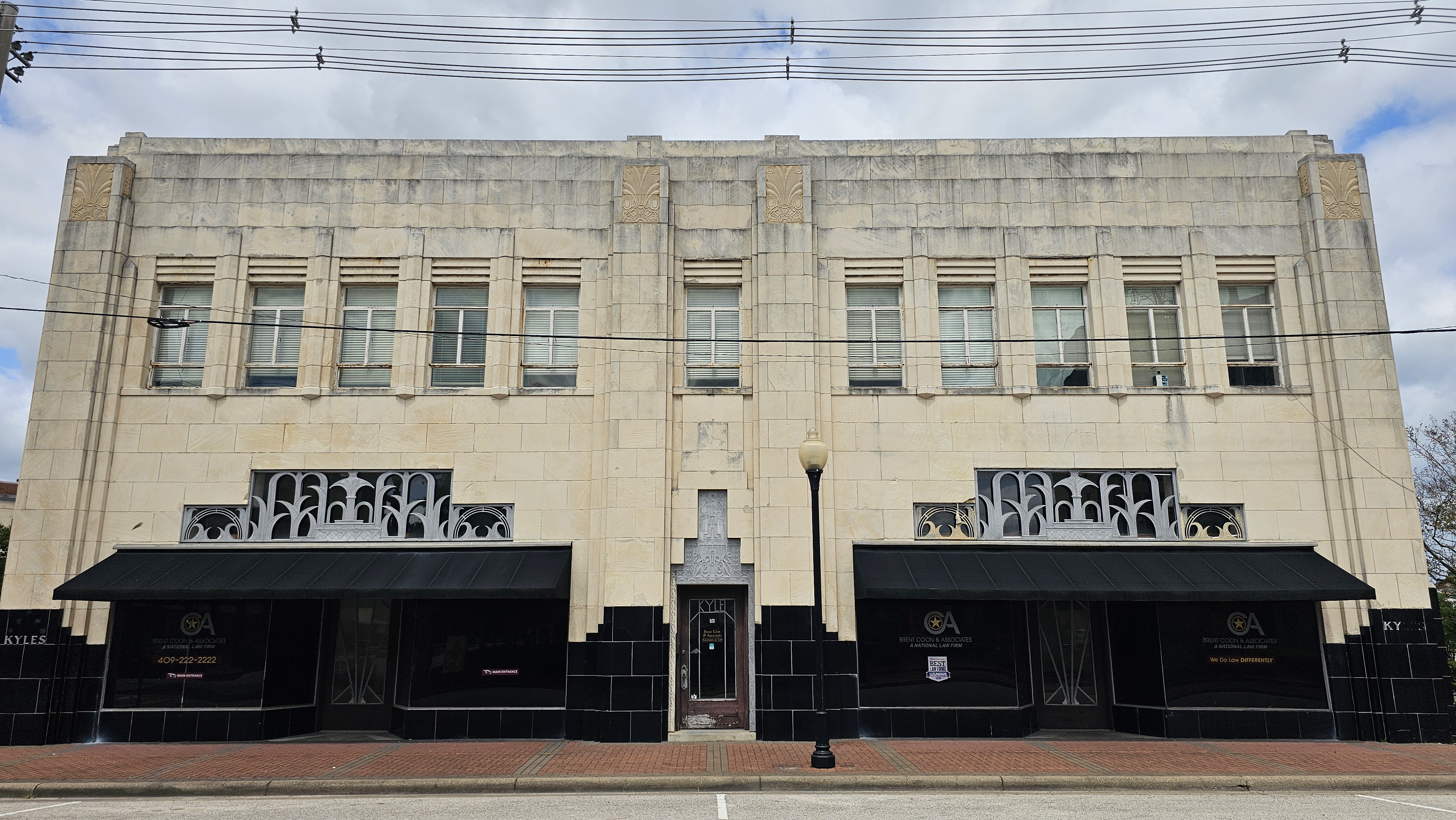
Side of the building

== See also ==
- National Register of Historic Places listings in Jefferson County, Texas
