= National Register of Historic Places listings in Liberty County, Texas =

Location of Liberty County in Texas

This is a list of the National Register of Historic Places listings in Liberty County, Texas.

This is intended to be a complete list of properties listed on the National Register of Historic Places in Liberty County, Texas. There are six properties listed on the National Register in the county. Two properties are also Recorded Texas Historic Landmarks.

This National Park Service list is complete through NPS recent listings posted March 21, 2025.

== Current listings ==
The publicly disclosed locations of National Register properties may be seen in a mapping service provided.

	Name on the Register	Image	Date listed	Location	City or town	Description
1	Black Cloud	Black Cloud	October 22, 1992 (#92001401)	Address restricted	Liberty	
2	Thomas Jefferson Chambers House		April 8, 2011 (#11000156)	624 Milam St; 30°03′42″N 94°47′53″W	Liberty	Recorded Texas Historic Landmark
3	Cleveland-Partlow House	Cleveland-Partlow House	February 16, 1984 (#84001907)	2131 Grand Ave. 30°03′49″N 94°47′06″W	Liberty	Recorded Texas Historic Landmark
4	Liberty County Courthouse	Liberty County Courthouse	December 12, 2002 (#02001514)	1923 Sam Houston Blvd. 30°03′32″N 94°47′47″W	Liberty	
5	Site 41 Lb 4	Site 41 Lb 4	July 14, 1971 (#71000947)	Address restricted	Dayton	
6	State Highway 3 Bridge at the Trinity River	State Highway 3 Bridge at the Trinity River	October 10, 1996 (#96001114)	US 90, 1.3 mi (2.1 km). W of jct. with FM 2684; 30°03′27″N 94°49′09″W	Liberty	Historic Bridges of Texas, 1866-1945 MPS

== See also ==
- National Register of Historic Places listings in Texas
- Recorded Texas Historic Landmarks in Liberty County
