= Allen Academy Memorial Hall =

- U.S. National Register of Historic Places
- Location within Texas Location within the United States
- Location: 1100 Ursuline, Bryan, Texas
- Coordinates: 30°40′35″N 96°21′43″W
- Area: 3.6 acres (1.5 ha)
- Built: 1924
- Architectural style: Mission Revival
- MPS: Bryan MRA
- NRHP reference No.: 87001603
- Added to NRHP: September 25, 1987

The Allen Academy, in the 1100 block of Ursuline in Bryan, Texas, was built in 1924. It was listed on the National Register of Historic Places in 1987.

It is a two-story masonry building with stucco exterior. It has Mission Revival style with parapets.
