= National Register of Historic Places listings in Chambers County, Texas =

Location of Chambers County in Texas

This is a list of the National Register of Historic Places listings in Chambers County, Texas.

This is intended to be a complete list of properties and districts listed on the National Register of Historic Places in Chambers County, Texas. There are two districts and four individual properties listed on the National Register in the county. Two individually listed properties are State Antiquities Landmarks including one that is also a Recorded Texas Historic Landmark.

This National Park Service list is complete through NPS recent listings posted March 21, 2025.

== Current listings ==
The publicly disclosed locations of National Register properties and districts may be seen in a mapping service provided.

	Name on the Register	Image	Date listed	Location	City or town	Description
1	Archeological Site 41 CH 110	Archeological Site 41 CH 110	July 14, 1971 (#71000924)	Address restricted	Cove	
2	Chambers County Courthouse	Chambers County Courthouse	April 25, 2008 (#08000339)	404 Washington St., 29°46′09″N 94°41′05″W	Anahuac	
3	Chambersea	Chambersea	November 19, 1979 (#79002925)	Washington and Cummings Sts; 29°46′15″N 94°41′05″W	Anahuac	State Antiquities Landmark, Recorded Texas Historic Landmark; General Thomas Jefferson Chambers House
4	Fort Anahuac	Fort Anahuac	July 1, 1981 (#81000626)	Corner of Main St. and Chambers; 29°45′24″N 94°41′17″W	Anahuac	State Antiquities Landmark
5	Old Wallisville Town Site	Old Wallisville Town Site	March 30, 1982 (#82004495)	Address restricted	Wallisville	
6	Orcoquisac Archeological District	Orcoquisac Archeological District	July 14, 1971 (#71000925)	Address restricted	Wallisville	

== See also ==
- National Register of Historic Places listings in Texas
- Recorded Texas Historic Landmarks in Chambers County
