= Hotel Marshall =

The Marshall Grand
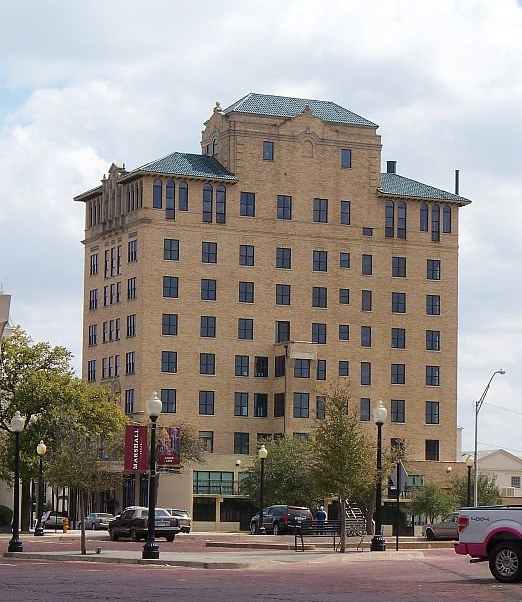
- The Marshall Grand in 2011

- Location within Texas
- Former names: The Marshall, Hotel Manziel, Hotel Marshall
- Alternative names: Hotel Marshall

General information
- Type: Hotel
- Architectural style: Art-Deco
- Location: 210 East Houston Street, Marshall, Texas, United States
- Coordinates: 32.544796°N 94.365553°W
- Current tenants: Stottford House Restaurant
- Completed: 1929
- Renovated: 1958, 2004-2006
- Owner: ETBU (August 2013-Current); Jerry Cargill (2002-August 2013); ETBU (1973-????); Earl Hollandsworth (1957-1973); Bobby Manziel (1956-1957)

Technical details
- Floor count: 8
- Lifts/elevators: 2

The Marshall Grand (Formerly Hotel Marshall) is a high-rise hotel in Marshall, the county seat of Harrison County, Texas.

The building was constructed about 1929 and is noted for its art-deco elements.

In actuality it draws from several styles that were popular at the time. The hotel was originally called "The Marshall" and was one of three (The Kaufman in Kaufman and The Gibraltar in Paris) of the Pethybridge Hotel Co. ventures in East Texas.

== History ==
On March 8, 1929 the property that Hotel Marshall now stands on was sold for $30,461.30 to S.B. (Sam) Perkins.

Sam Perkins, a local merchant, commissioned Wyatt Hedrick to design a hotel next to his Perkins' Brothers Store in Marshall. A fire in 1949 destroyed the store and part of the hotel.

Construction of the building was pushed to be completed by the annual Regional Rotary Club convention. Bobby Manziel, a Tyler, Texas, oil man, bought the Hotel Marshall on July 28, 1956. He renamed the hotel after himself and unexpectedly died a year later. Mrs. Manziel sold the hotel to Earl Hollandsworth for $225,000 in 1957.

Hollandsworth planned a major renovation for the hotel in the 1950s. He put up $125,000 to help finance it. The Chamber of Commerce raised $100,000 and local citizens gave another $100,000. The local businessmen made a deal with Hollandsworth to loan $250,000 to finance the remodeling. The building between the Hotel Marshall and the Capitol Hotel was torn down. A swimming pool and patio were put in its place.

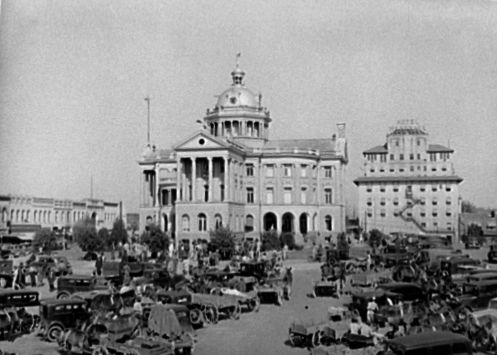
Capitol Hotel, right, and the taller Hotel Marshall in 1939.

The hotel was one of the major attractions in East Texas in the mid 20th century; complete with an elaborate red carpet, bellhops, valets, and a shoeshine stand in the basement. The building was the center of the city's social scene during the late 1940s. The Rotarians, Kiwanis, and Lions Club met there every week with the day of the meeting on a rotating schedule. Many of the African American performers who entertained them were forced to ride the freight elevator rather than the main elevator to the Roof Garden. The patio was the site of many fashion shows. The Marshall Club is, perhaps, the greatest example of this period of the building’s history. The Marshall Club was a private social club for some of Marshall’s most affluent families. The members of the club had a special part of the hotel designated for them: the mezzanine. A Christmas party was held every year as well as two to three other parties throughout the year. The most common activity, bingo, was played every week. The members financed the club themselves, allowing it to be extremely elegant.

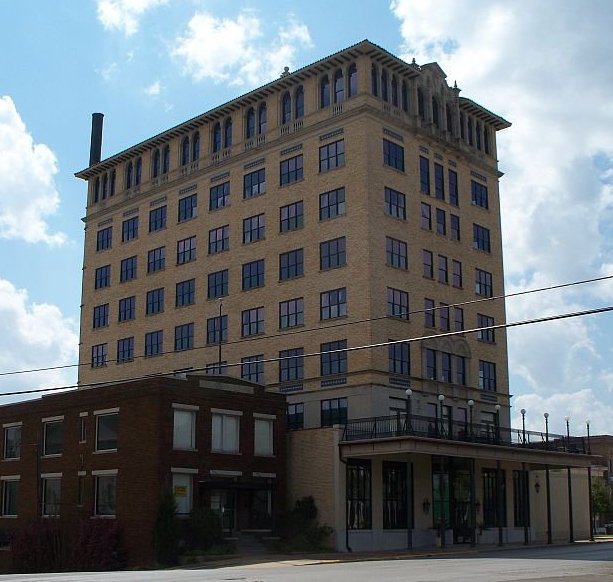
The Marshall Grand in 2011.

While the 1958 remodeling elevated some of Hotel Marshall's luster it also created problems. In earlier times the hotel had two stoves, one for the Roof Garden and one reserved for room service. Hollandsworth removed one of them and replaced it with a hot plate in the newly created coffee shop. This increased pressure on the kitchen to get food out fast to both guests and shop customers. Two elevators would have been perfectly adequate if one had not been used as a freight elevator. On nights when there were events hosted in the hotel, the lobby could get very congested.

Another problem was that the remodeling placed the thermostats in the halls instead of the rooms. With the opening of motels in Marshall, Hotel Marshall’s dominance began to buckle. Businessmen began to complain about no return on their investments in the hotel. Management was changed almost monthly, hampering the clockwork precision a hotel should have. The social center began to drift away as the rich and middle-class families abandoned the city center for suburbs such as Jasper Heights and Bel Air. The coffee shop's hours were reduced and the Roof Garden was closed. Businessmen began to suggest motels over the Hotel Marshall, due to the chaotic conditions of its management. This final blow forced the hotel to close its doors.

East Texas Baptist University purchased the hotel in 1973. It was to be used as a dormitory for boys, until the completion of a new dormitory. With the new dormitory completed the Hotel Marshall was once again abandoned. Through change in various ownerships and restoration ideas and projects 1980s and 1990s, none materialized. By 2000 the letters of the Hotel Marshall sign were deteriorating and toppling down onto the roof. The north face's seventh floor balcony and second floor balcony’s light posts had been removed, the windows were busted out, and the Roof Garden had been stripped of its mural. Jerry Cargill and Richard and Christina Anderson purchased the building and have begun renovating the hotel with help from local investors and aid from the city commission. The entire building was gutted with the first floor restored converting the lobby into a reception area and restoring the coffee shop area into a restaurant which was leased to Stottford House. A new elevator system was installed and the second floor was converted to a condominium. Floors 3-8 remained construction ready.

In August 2013 Mr. and Mrs. Cargill gifted The Marshall Grand to East Texas Baptist University. On Friday, March 25, 2016 Stottford House closed due to change of building ownership. ETBU has plans of expanding its campus presence to downtown Marshall utilizing The Marshall Grand including adding a popular coffee shop. The first floor continues to be available for lease for social events.

== Photo gallery ==
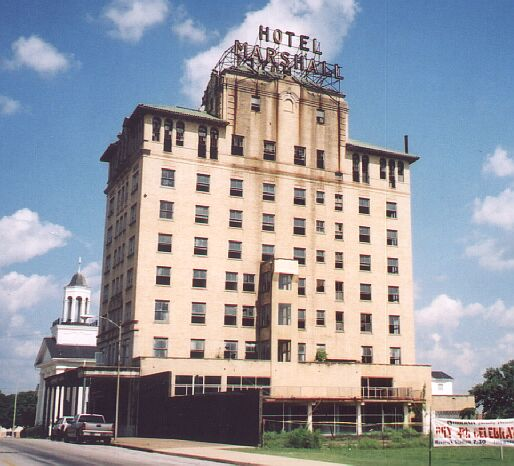
Abandoned Hotel Marshall in 2002

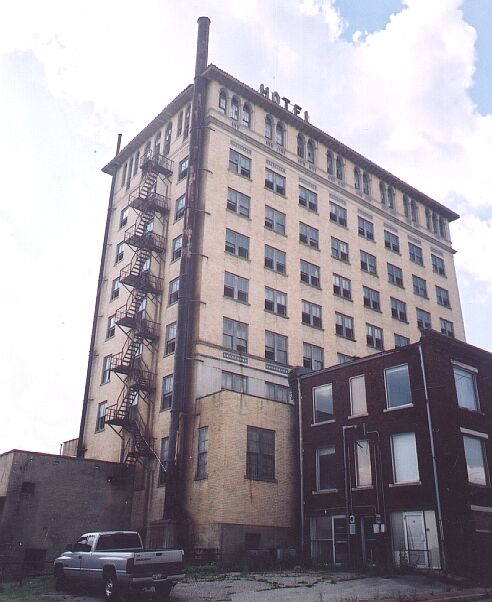
Abandoned Hotel Marshall renovations in 2004

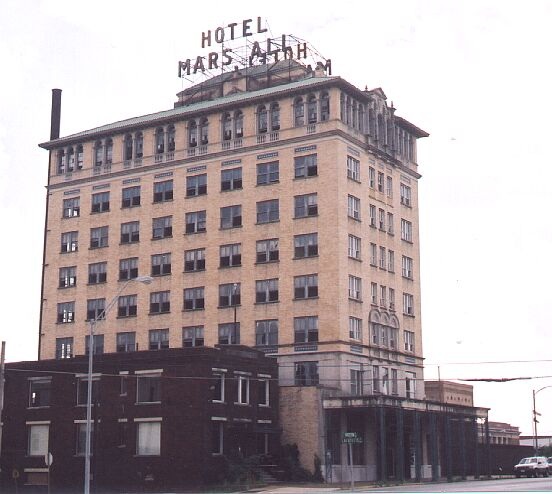
Abandoned Hotel Marshall in 2002

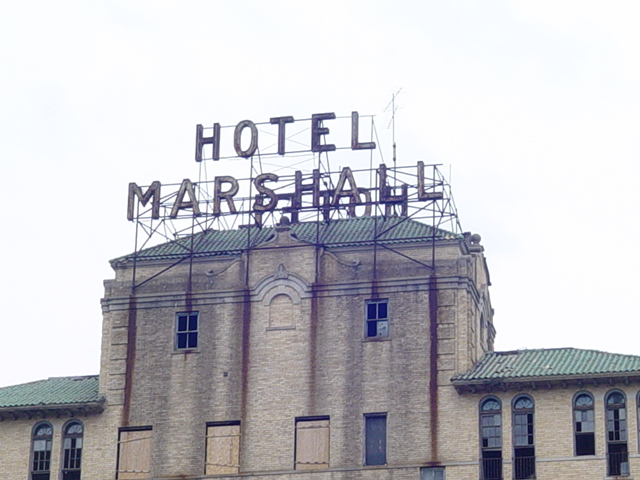
Sign on top of the abandoned Hotel Marshall in 2004

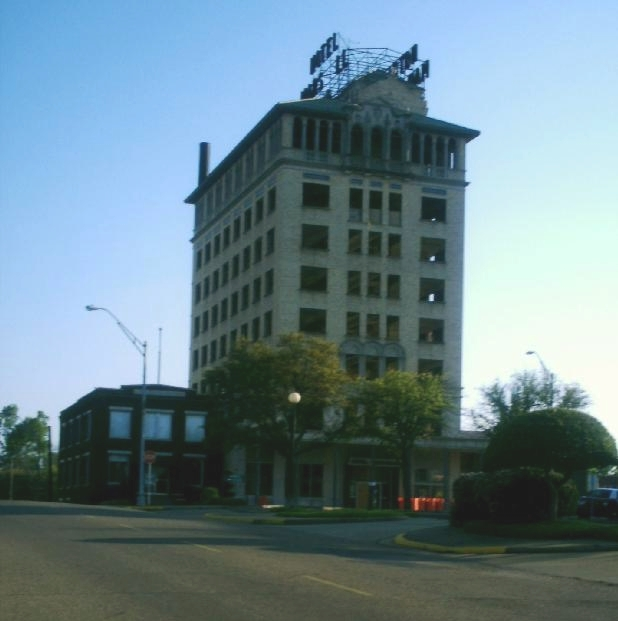
Renovation in 2005

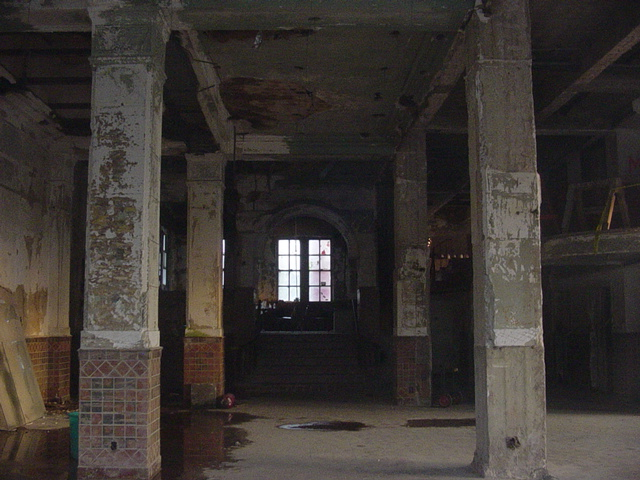
Lobby of the abandoned Hotel Marshall in 2004

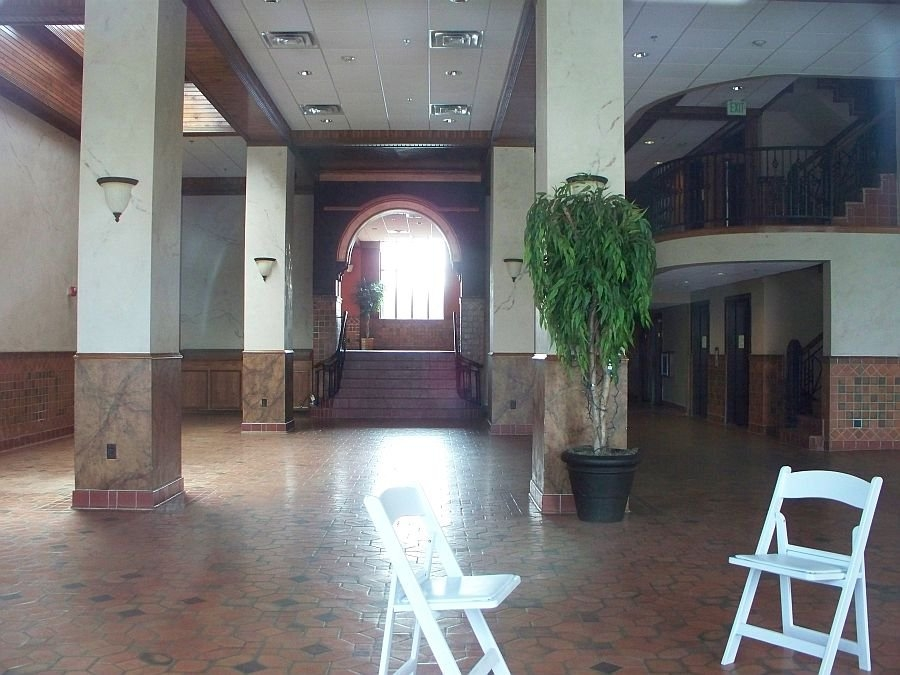
Lobby of The Marshall Grand in 2011

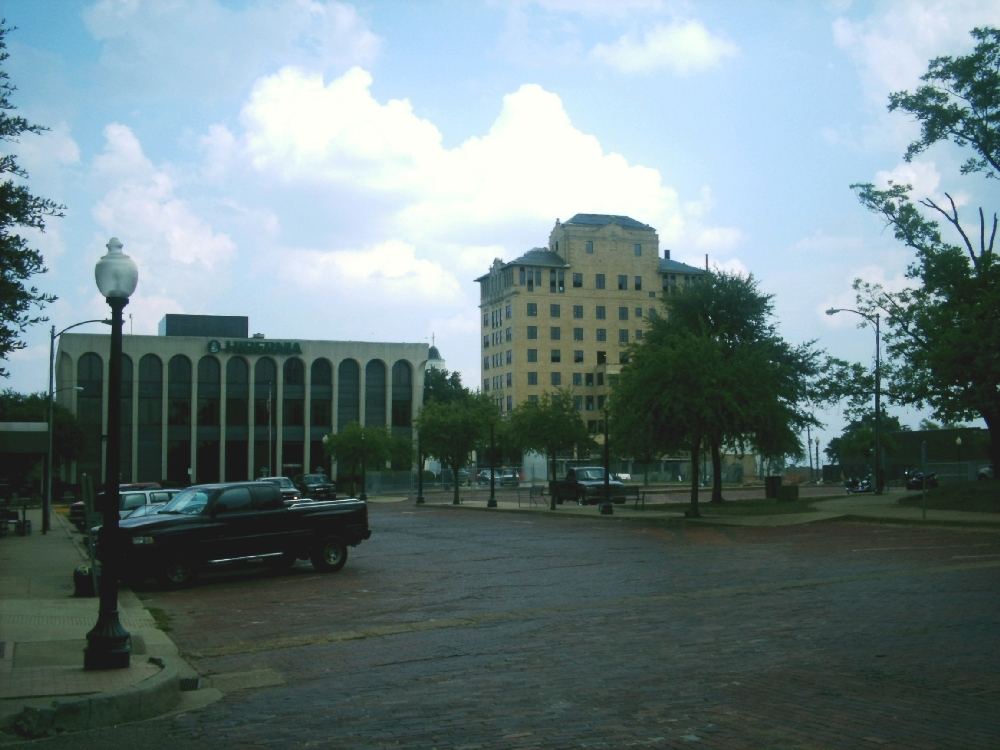
Renovation in 2005
