= Liberty County Courthouse (Texas) =

- U.S. National Register of Historic Places
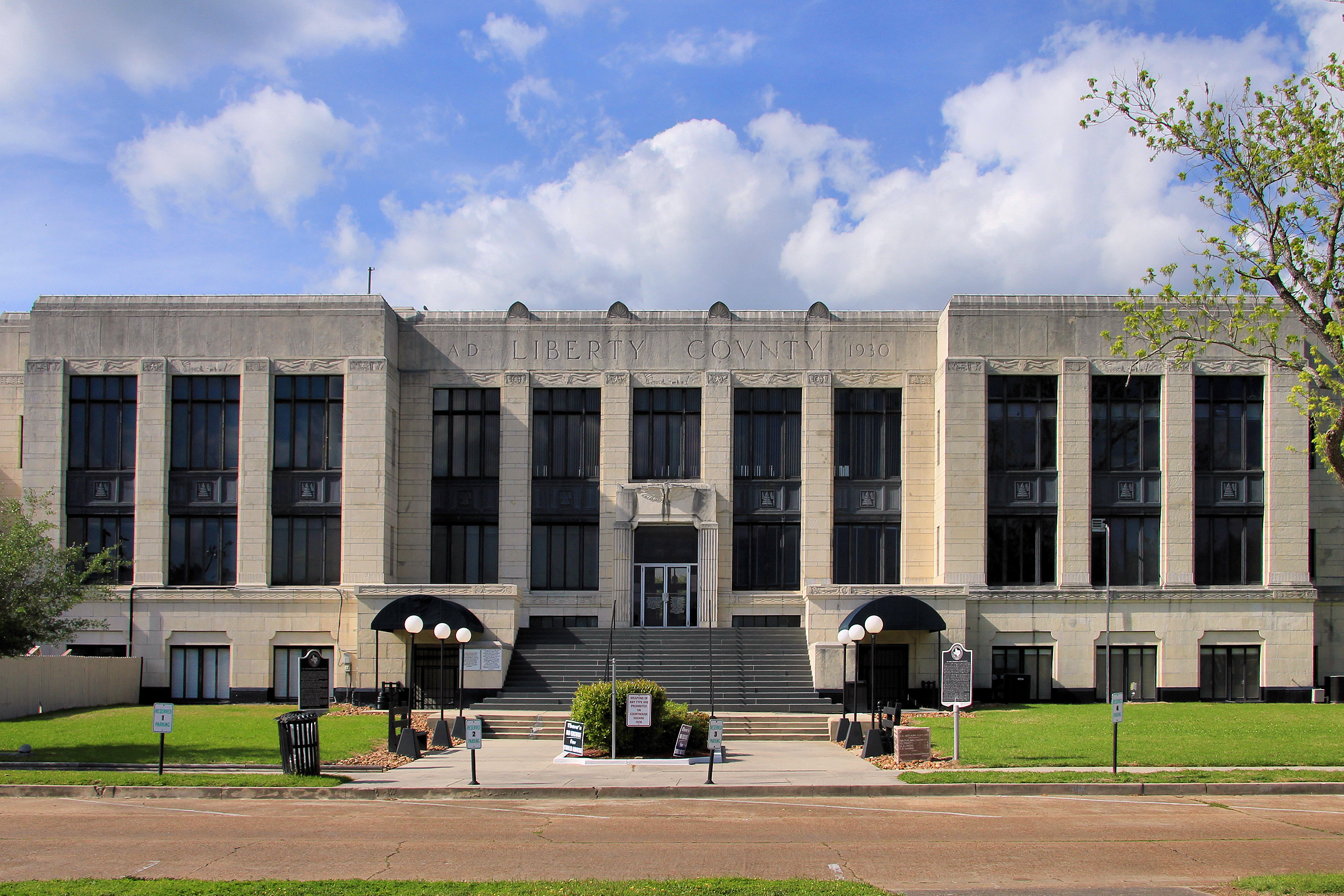
- Liberty County Courthouse, 2014

- Location within Texas Location within the United States
- Location: 1923 Sam Houston Blvd., Liberty, Texas
- Coordinates: 30°03′32″N 94°47′47″W
- Area: less than one acre
- Built: 1931
- Architect: Curtis, Corneil G.
- Architectural style: Art Deco
- NRHP reference No.: 02001514
- Added to NRHP: December 12, 2002

The Liberty County Courthouse is a historic county courthouse located in Liberty, Texas, and serves as the official courthouse for Liberty County. Built in 1931 on the site of an earlier courthouse and expanded in 1956, it was added to the National Register of Historic Places in 2002.

== History ==
The usage of this site for government purposes dates back to 1831. During the planning of the settlement that would become Liberty, the area was designated by José Francisco Madero for use as a government plaza. Following the result of the Texas Revolution in 1836, which established Liberty County itself, this plaza converted into a courthouse square. In 1840, the first Methodist sermon in Liberty was hosted in the existing log courthouse. Decades later, the courthouse would also be the first meeting place for the new First Baptist Church of Liberty, which was established in 1898.

Over the next century, the local economy oscillated between stagnancy and slow decline. At least six courthouses preceded the current one. A series of fires plagued the government square, sometimes damaging or entirely destroying the courthouse. One burned down on December 24, 1873, destroying most of the records with it. The 1895 courthouse, which was the last courthouse built before the current one, was threatened at least once by a fire in 1909.

In the early 20th century, the Texas oil boom revitalized the economy. The local government found itself in possession of enough funding to remodel the old 1895 courthouse, which it deemed inadequate for the county's recordkeeping. Houston architect Corneil G. Curtis was hired to survey the old courthouse in the mid-1920s, and he determined it was much more cost-effective to demolish it and rebuild. In 1927, Curtis began designing the new building in an Art Deco style. Several years passed before a building contract could be settled, as most passed on it, deeming it too costly. However, in September 1930, M. H. Ryland of Uvalde was awarded the bid on the construction. Offices were temporarily moved next door into a vacant Methodist church. Construction took up most of 1931 and was finally completed in December at a grand total of $250,000.

In 1955, the county announced it was considering adding an annex to the courthouse. Houston architect Wyatt C. Hedrick was hired to design the new addition, which he appended to the west end of the original building. This provided space for a new courtroom and offices. Construction was completed in 1956.

== Architecture ==
The Art Deco style chosen by Curtis had not yet been widely reflected across Texas, and the Liberty County Courthouse is one of the earliest examples of this style in the state. Some architects have identified the courthouse as belonging to a subcategory of Art Deco, which Jay Henry coined the Modern Classic style. Both Curtis and the Liberty County council favored these elements of Progressivism, which they believed reflected contemporary society's values during the Roaring Twenties. It has notable similarities to the Rusk County Courthouse and the Chambers County Courthouse, which Curtis also designed in 1928 and 1936, respectively. Its overall layout, however, is very similar to earlier Texas courthouses, which often were constructed in a Beaux-Arts or Neoclassical style.

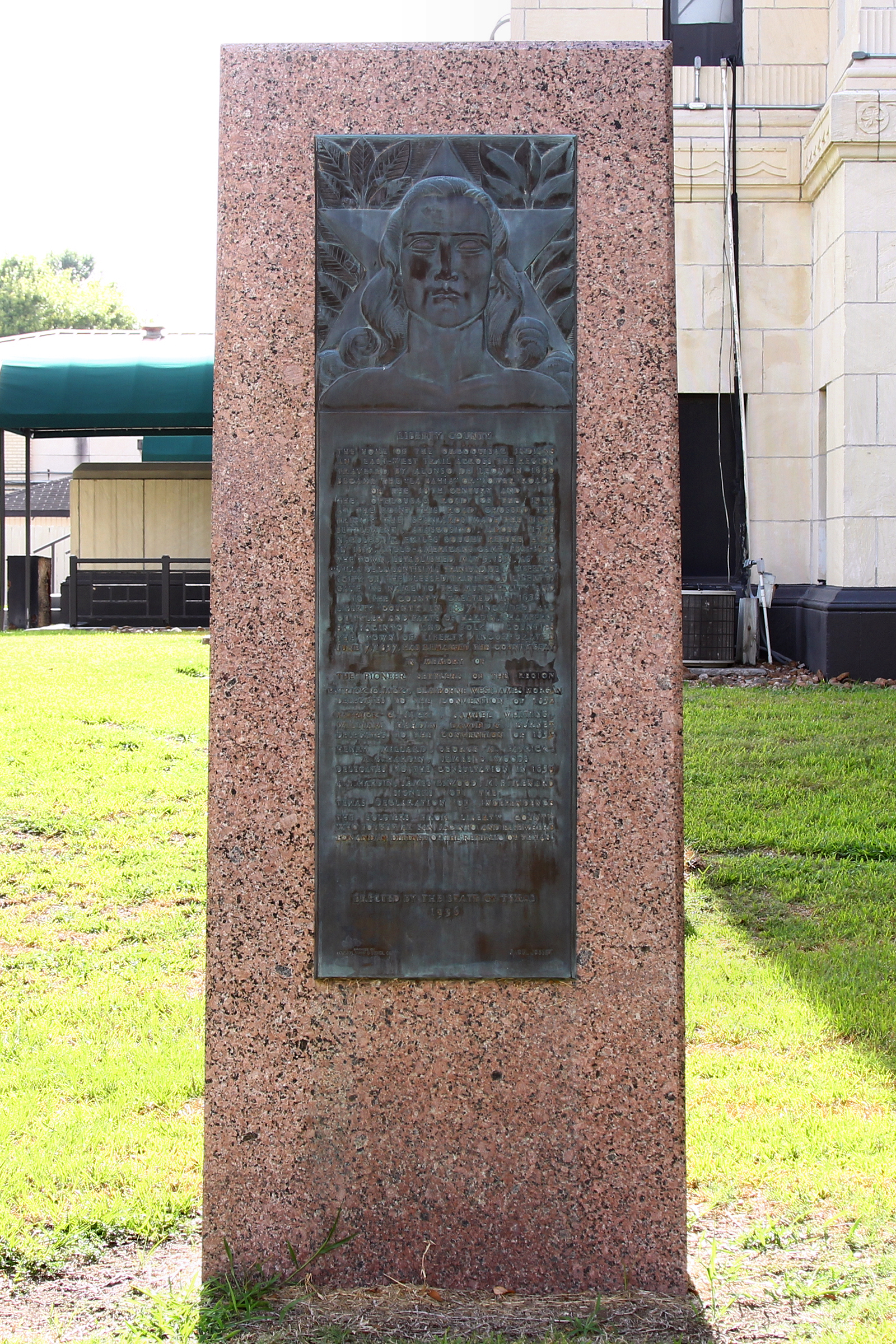
The Liberty County 1936 Texas Centennial Monument located on the courthouse grounds

The original courthouse building measures 62 by 144 feet (19 by 44 m) with 8-foot-long (2.4 m) projections on either side, making the floor plan resemble a shallow "H", and contains two stories and a basement. The facade is mainly constructed of Texas Cordova Cream limestone over a concrete frame and foundation with steel trusses. Overall, it is much simpler in detail than many Art Deco buildings, owing to its more modernist leanings. The large windows are interrupted by large pilasters that ascend up to the second-story frieze, upon which is inscribed "Liberty County AD 1930" in Latin script. Most of the building's ornamentation consists of bands of metal bas-relief panels that run horizontally along the dado and across and between the pilasters. These motifs reflect everyday elements of Texan life, ecology, and geography; such sculptures include pine trees, the Lone Star symbol taken from the Texas flag, covered wagons, Texas Longhorns, and oil derricks. Stylized eagles decorate the entablature above the main entryways located at on each of the four faces.

Inside, two main hallways bisect the building into quadrants. Stairways at each end provide access to the second floor. Much of the original mosaic flooring and marble wainscoting are still intact. The courtroom itself still contains most of its original features.

Since its construction, the building has been largely unchanged, except for periodic remodels and the 1956 expansion to the west side. This addition attempted to complement the original structure and used similar limestone for its facades, it is decidedly much more plain and unornamented. The slightly recessed sash windows are lined with aluminum, and the limestone paneling is interrupted by beige brickwork around the outer windows. A metal hipped roof was added to the new wing in the 1990s.
