= Old Sinclair Station =

- Sinclair Station, (Old)
- U.S. National Register of Historic Places
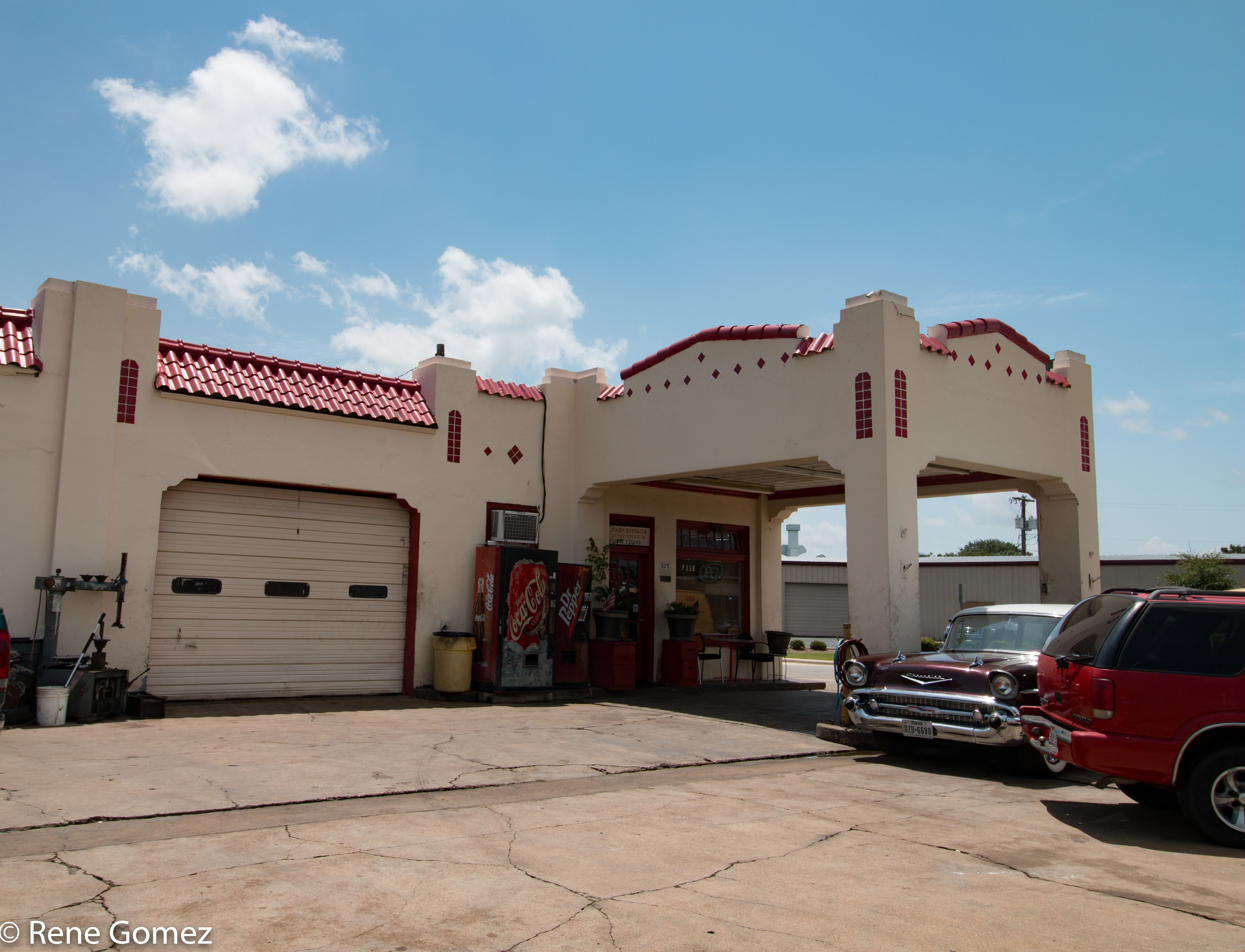

- Location within Texas
- Location: 507 S. Texas, Bryan, Texas
- Coordinates: 30°40′08″N 96°22′14″W
- Area: less than one acre
- Built: 1933
- Architectural style: Spanish style commercial
- MPS: Bryan MRA
- NRHP reference No.: 87001644
- Added to NRHP: September 25, 1987

The Old Sinclair Station, at 507 S. Texas in Bryan, Texas, was built in 1933. It was listed on the National Register of Historic Places in 1987.
