= Tom Lovell (building contractor) =

Scottish-American contractor of public buildings

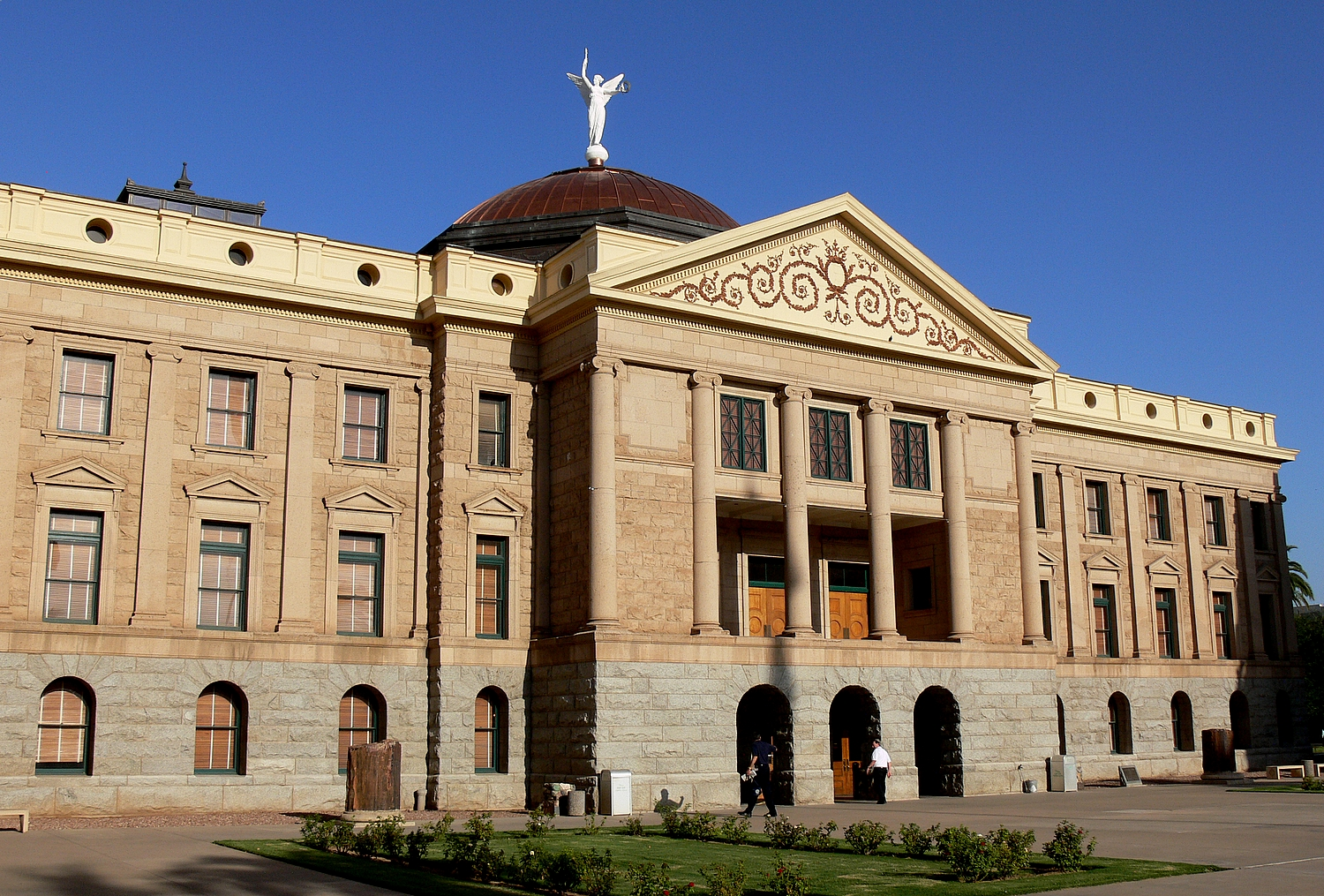
- Arizona State Capitol, completed by Lovell in 1900
- Born: May 5, 1852; West Kilbride, Scotland
- Died: September 8, 1911 (aged 59); Denton, Texas, US
- Occupation: General contractor
- Known for: Historic public buildings

Thomas Lovell (May 5, 1852 – September 8, 1911), commonly known as Tom Lovell, was a Scottish-born American builder and general contractor. Lovell and the contracting firms he headed constructed eleven Texas county courthouses, along with post offices, federal buildings, county jails, and the territorial capitol in Phoenix, now the Arizona State Capitol. Several buildings constructed by Lovell are listed on the National Register of Historic Places or designated as Recorded Texas Historic Landmarks.

== Early life and family ==
Lovell was born in West Kilbride, Scotland, in 1852. He married Theresa Begley in County Armagh, Ireland, in 1877 and immigrated to the United States in 1882. He initially settled in Brownwood, Texas, and became a naturalized United States citizen in 1891.

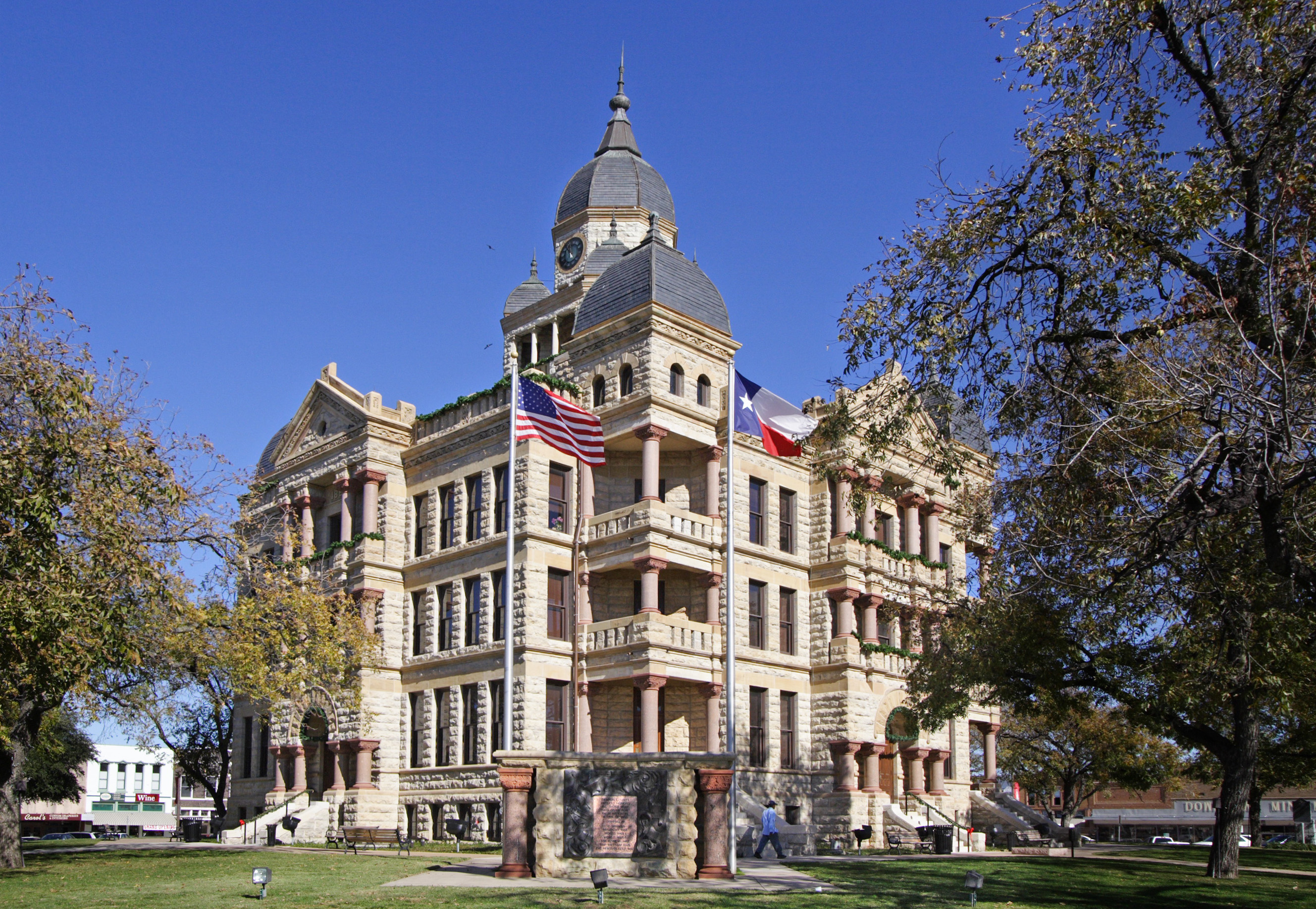
The Denton County Courthouse-on-the-Square, built by Lovell in 1896

Lovell moved to Denton, Texas, around 1895, where he built a house at 1606 West Oak Street. His first wife, Theresa, died that year. In 1896, he built the Denton County Courthouse-on-the-Square and married Seddie Thurmond, a Missouri widow. Lovell and Thurmond later platted land behind their home and renamed part of Lovell Street as Normal Street, in honor of early faculty members of the North Texas Normal College, now the University of North Texas.

Among Lovell's children were daughters Mary, Anne, and Ellen. Mary married contractor Patrick Joseph Lenahan, who built the Magnolia Building in Dallas. She taught at Bryan High School and later worked as a student conduct administrator at the University of Colorado. Anne married Dallas physician and surgeon William Worthington Samuell. Ellen was educated at Southern Methodist University and Columbia University and directed the Public Relations Division of the National Tuberculosis Association from May 1944 to April 1959.

== Career ==
Lovell operated as a building contractor, sometimes under the names T. Lovell and Company and Tom Lovell & Sons. A 2017 KWTX historical feature credited Lovell with eleven Texas courthouses, five post offices, two federal buildings, and four county jails. During the first decade of the twentieth century, Lovell and his firms expanded beyond Texas county construction into federal work across the western United States, including post offices and federal buildings in Colorado, Utah, Oklahoma, and Wyoming.

=== Arizona State Capitol ===
Among Lovell's major commissions was the construction of the territorial capitol building in Phoenix, Arizona, now the Arizona State Capitol. Designed by James Riely Gordon, the plans were reduced from Gordon's original proposal because of funding constraints, and the building was completed by Lovell in 1900. Contemporary Arizona coverage reported that Lovell "never permitted the work to drag" and that the completed structure contained no defective work.

The Arizona State Capitol Museum later distinguished between the Capitol Commission's total expenditures of $135,774.29 and Lovell's construction contract, stating that Lovell received $117,290 for labor and materials, while the remainder covered administrative expenses and furnishings not included in the construction contract. The same account noted that the territorial press regarded the commission and Lovell as having provided the Territory with "a bargain" for a building worth considerably more.

=== U.S. Post Office and Federal Building, Port Arthur ===
In 1910, Tom Lovell & Sons was awarded the construction contract for the U.S. Post Office and Federal Building in Port Arthur, Texas. Designed by the Office of the Supervising Architect of the U.S. Treasury Department while James Knox Taylor served as Supervising Architect, the Classical Revival building was completed in 1911.

Constructed during Port Arthur's emergence as a major Gulf seaport, the building was intended as a conspicuous expression of the city's growing commercial importance. From 1912, it housed not only the post office but also federal customs, immigration, quarantine, agricultural, public-health, military-recruiting, and weather services. During the hurricane of 1915, the building sheltered more than 100 people for 30 hours after they fled there for protection.

In 1935, the firm was again awarded the construction contract, this time for a major expansion completed in 1937. The building was listed on the National Register of Historic Places in 1986.

=== Selected works ===
The following table lists selected buildings constructed by Lovell or firms with which he was associated.

Building	Location	Date	Role	Architect or designer
Brown County Courthouse	Brownwood, Texas	1884	Builder, Thomas Lovell	Dodson & Dudley
Lampasas County Courthouse	Lampasas, Texas	1884	Stone contractor, T. Lovell and Company	W.C. Dodson
Hamilton County Courthouse	Hamilton, Texas	1886	Contractor, Lovell, Hood and McLeod	William Martin
Brewster County Courthouse	Alpine, Texas	1887	Builder	Not identified
Williamson County Jail	Georgetown, Texas	1888	Contractor, Lovell & Miller	Dodson & Dudley
Runnels County Courthouse	Ballinger, Texas	1889	Contractor	Eugene T. Heiner
Lovell–Dobbs House	Brownwood, Texas	1889	Builder	—
Hill County Courthouse	Hillsboro, Texas	1890	Contractor	W.C. Dodson
Childress County Courthouse	Childress, Texas	1891	Contractors, Lovell, Miller & Hood	William Douglas
St. John's Episcopal Church	Brownwood, Texas	1892	Contractor, with William Hood	Not identified (plans donated anonymously)
Hill County Jail	Hillsboro, Texas	1893	Contractor, Lovell and Wood	W.C. Dodson
Lovell–Buchanan House	Denton, Texas	1896	Builder	—
Denton County Courthouse-on-the-Square	Denton, Texas	1896	Contractor	W.C. Dodson
Old Brazoria County Courthouse	Angleton, Texas	1897	Contractor	Eugene T. Heiner
Coryell County Courthouse	Gatesville, Texas	1897	Builder	W.C. Dodson
Arizona Territorial Capitol	Phoenix, Arizona	1900	Contractor	James Riely Gordon
McLennan County Courthouse	Waco, Texas	1902	Contractor	James Riely Gordon
Acadia Parish Courthouse	Crowley, Louisiana	1902	Contractor	James Riely Gordon and W. L. Stevens
Post Office and Federal Building (now Leadville City Hall)	Leadville, Colorado	1905	Builder	F. L. Lecaff (supervising architect)
Hardeman County Courthouse	Quanah, Texas	1908	Contractor, Tom Lovell & Sons	R. H. Stuckey
Post Office	Provo, Utah	1909	Contractor	Office of the Supervising Architect, under James Knox Taylor
Post Office and Courthouse	Ogden, Utah	1909	Contractor	James Knox Taylor
Post Office and Federal Building	Port Arthur, Texas	1911	Contractor, Tom Lovell & Sons	James Knox Taylor
Federal Building	Enid, Oklahoma	1911	Contractor, Tom Lovell Company	James Knox Taylor
Post Office and Courthouse	Lander, Wyoming	1912	Contractor, Tom Lovell & Sons	James Knox Taylor

== Death and legacy ==
Lovell died at his Oak Street home in Denton in 1911 after a three-month paralysis and was buried in Denton's I.O.O.F. Cemetery beside Theresa. A Dallas Morning News obituary described him as "one of Denton's prominent citizens". His sons continued the contracting business after his death, and Tom Lovell & Sons remained active at least through 1937, when it completed the major expansion of the U.S. Post Office and Federal Building in Port Arthur.

A 1965 proposal to demolish the Denton County Courthouse-on-the-Square was defeated after local opposition, and the building was later preserved as a central landmark of the city.

More than a century after its completion, the Port Arthur Federal Building became part of a proposed revitalization of the city's downtown. In 2019, Motiva Enterprises announced plans to rehabilitate the building and the neighboring Adams Building for office use while preserving their historic exteriors. Construction on the two buildings resumed in 2023.
