= National Register of Historic Places listings in Anderson County, Texas =

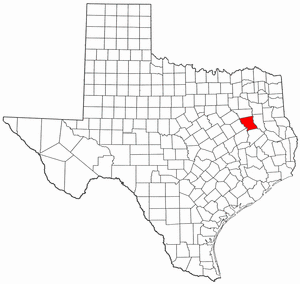
Location of Anderson County in Texas

This is a list of the National Register of Historic Places listings in Anderson County, Texas.

This is intended to be a complete list of properties and districts listed on the National Register of Historic Places in Anderson County, Texas. There are five districts and 24 individual properties listed on the National Register in the county. Eight individually listed properties are designated Recorded Texas Historic Landmarks while more are contained within two districts.

This National Park Service list is complete through NPS recent listings posted May 1, 2026.

== Current listings ==
The publicly disclosed locations of National Register properties and districts may be seen in a mapping service provided.

| | Name on the Register | Image | Date listed | Location | City or town | Description |
|---|---|---|---|---|---|---|
| 1 | Anderson Camp Ground | Anderson Camp Ground | December 27, 1982 (#82001735) | W of Brushy Creek on Farm to Market Road 837; 31°57′14″N 95°37′23″W | Brushy Creek | also called Brushy Creek Arbor and United Methodist Church |
| 2 | Anderson County Courthouse | Anderson County Courthouse | September 28, 1992 (#92001256) | 1 Public Sq. 31°45′54″N 95°37′34″W | Palestine | Recorded Texas Historic Landmark |
| 3 | Anderson County Jail | Anderson County Jail | June 11, 1998 (#98000692) | 704 Avenue A 31°45′50″N 95°37′36″W | Palestine | Historic and Architectural Resources of Palestine MPS |
| 4 | William and Caroline Broyles House | William and Caroline Broyles House | November 10, 1988 (#88002614) | 1305 S. Sycamore St. 31°44′52″N 95°37′44″W | Palestine | Recorded Texas Historic Landmark |
| 5 | Bethel Baptist Church | | December 17, 2025 (#100012086) | 2849 County Rd 2608; 31°53′35″N 95°55′00″W | Tennessee Colony | |
| 6 | Denby Building | Denby Building | June 11, 1998 (#98000694) | 201 W. Crawford St. 31°45′47″N 95°37′56″W | Palestine | Historic and Architectural Resources of Palestine MPS |
| 7 | G. E. Dilley Building | G. E. Dilley Building | June 11, 1998 (#98000698) | 503 W. Main St. 31°45′44″N 95°38′05″W | Palestine | Historic and Architectural Resources of Palestine MPS |
| 8 | First Presbyterian Church | First Presbyterian Church | June 11, 1998 (#98000695) | 406 Avenue A 31°45′45″N 95°37′44″W | Palestine | Recorded Texas Historic Landmark; Historic and Architectural Resources of Palestine MPS |
| 9 | Freeman Farm | Freeman Farm | June 12, 2000 (#00000656) | Co. Rd. 323, 3 miles SE of Frankston; 31°59′38″N 95°29′53″W | Frankston | also called Kickapoo Farm, Freeman Plantation |
| 10 | Gatewood-Shelton Gin | Gatewood-Shelton Gin | June 3, 1998 (#98000637) | 304 E. Crawford; 31°45′50″N 95°37′41″W | Palestine | Historic and Architectural Resources of Palestine MPS |
| 11 | Howard House | Howard House | March 14, 1993 (#93000072) | 1011 N. Perry St. 31°46′11″N 95°37′34″W | Palestine | Recorded Texas Historic Landmark; part of the North Side Historic District |
| 12 | Lincoln High School | | June 3, 1998 (#98000636) | 920 W. Swantz St. 31°45′20″N 95°38′26″W | Palestine | Historic and Architectural Resources of Palestine MPS; burned in 1999, demolished. |
| 13 | Link House | Link House | May 29, 1980 (#80004073) | 925 N. Link St. 31°46′06″N 95°37′46″W | Palestine | Part of the North Side Historic District; also called Link-Bunton House |
| 14 | Michaux Park Historic District | Michaux Park Historic District | April 28, 2004 (#04000380) | Roughly bounded by S. Micheaux St., Jolly St., Crokett Rd., Rogers St., and E Park Ave. 31°45′16″N 95°37′32″W | Palestine | Historic and Architectural Resources of Palestine MPS |
| 15 | Mount Vernon African Methodist Episcopal Church | Mount Vernon African Methodist Episcopal Church | June 3, 1998 (#98000635) | 913 E. Calhoun St. 31°46′05″N 95°37′22″W | Palestine | Recorded Texas Historic Landmark; Historic and Architectural Resources of Palestine MPS |
| 16 | North Side Historic District | North Side Historic District | July 1, 1998 (#98000825) | Roughly bounded by Kolsted, N. Perry, W. Green, and N. Conrad Sts. 31°46′07″N 95°37′53″W | Palestine | Includes Recorded Texas Historic Landmarks; Historic and Architectural Resources of Palestine MPS |
| 17 | Old Town Residential Historic District | Old Town Residential Historic District | June 15, 2006 (#06000509) | Roughly surrounded by Lacey St. 31°46′02″N 95°37′22″W | Palestine | |
| 18 | Pace McDonald Site | Pace McDonald Site | August 12, 1982 (#82004488) | Address restricted | Palestine | Smithsonian trinomial 41AN51 |
| 19 | Palestine Carnegie Library | Palestine Carnegie Library | October 17, 1988 (#88001944) | 502 N. Queen St. 31°45′48″N 95°38′04″W | Palestine | Recorded Texas Historic Landmark |
| 20 | Palestine High School | Palestine High School | September 24, 1986 (#86002295) | 400 Micheaux Ave. 31°45′29″N 95°37′38″W | Palestine | Recorded Texas Historic Landmark; currently the Museum for East Texas Culture |
| 21 | Palestine New Town Commercial Historic District | Palestine New Town Commercial Historic District | October 6, 2021 (#100007058) | Roughly bounded by North Queen, Crawford, North Houston, and Spring Sts. 31°45′44″N 95°37′57″W | Palestine | |
| 22 | Post Office-Palestine | Post Office-Palestine | June 11, 1998 (#98000693) | 101 E. Oak St. 31°45′46″N 95°37′52″W | Palestine | Historic and Architectural Resources of Palestine MPS |
| 23 | John H Reagan Monument | John H Reagan Monument | June 3, 1998 (#98000633) | Reagan Park; vicinity of Park and Crockett Sts. 31°45′28″N 95°37′31″W | Palestine | Historic and Architectural Resources of Palestine MPS |
| 24 | Redlands Hotel | Redlands Hotel | June 3, 1998 (#98000634) | 400 N. Queen St. 31°45′46″N 95°38′04″W | Palestine | Historic and Architectural Resources of Palestine MPS |
| 25 | Robinson Bank Building | Robinson Bank Building | June 11, 1998 (#98000691) | 213 W. Main St. 31°45′44″N 95°37′58″W | Palestine | Historic and Architectural Resources of Palestine MPS |
| 26 | Sacred Heart Catholic Church and School | Sacred Heart Catholic Church and School | December 6, 1979 (#79002909) | 503 N. Queen St. 31°45′45″N 95°38′04″W | Palestine | Recorded Texas Historic Landmark |
| 27 | A. C. Saunders Site | A. C. Saunders Site | July 15, 1982 (#82004487) | Address restricted | Frankston | Smithsonian trinomial 41AN19 |
| 28 | South Side Historic District | South Side Historic District | July 1, 1998 (#98000826) | Roughly bounded by W. Colorado, and S. Michaux Sts., and Union Pacific Railroad Tracks; 31°45′21″N 95°37′50″W | Palestine | Includes Recorded Texas Historic Landmarks; Historic and Architectural Resources of Palestine MPS |
| 29 | Texas & Pacific Steam Locomotive No. 610 | Texas & Pacific Steam Locomotive No. 610 | March 25, 1977 (#77001477) | Park Road 70; 31°44′28″N 95°34′16″W | Palestine | |

== See also ==
- National Register of Historic Places listings in Texas
- Recorded Texas Historic Landmarks in Anderson County
