= National Register of Historic Places listings in Coryell County, Texas =

Location of Coryell County in Texas

This is a list of the National Register of Historic Places listings in Coryell County, Texas.

This is intended to be a complete list of properties and districts listed on the National Register of Historic Places in Coryell County, Texas. There are two districts and three properties listed on the National Register in the county. Two individual properties are State Antiquities Landmarks while the third is a Recorded Texas Historic Landmark.

This National Park Service list is complete through NPS recent listings posted January 9, 2026.

== Current listings ==
The locations of National Register properties and districts may be seen in a mapping service provided.

	Name on the Register	Image	Date listed	Location	City or town	Description
1	Copperas Cove Stagestop and Post Office	Copperas Cove Stagestop and Post Office	September 26, 1979 (#79002928)	1.6 mi. SW of Copperas Cove off U.S. 190; 31°06′15″N 97°55′44″W	Copperas Cove	State Antiquities Landmark; known as Ogletree Stagestop and Post Office; built in 1878
2	Coryell County Courthouse	Coryell County Courthouse	August 18, 1977 (#77001435)	Bounded by 6th, 7th, Main and Leon Streets; 31°26′04″N 97°45′01″W	Gatesville	State Antiquities Landmark; Italian Renaissance Revival style building completed in 1898
3	Gatesville Downtown Historic District		January 20, 2026 (#100012588)	Roughly bounded by Saunders Street to the north, 10th Street to the west, Bridge and College Streets to the south, and 5th Street to the east. 31°26′06″N 97°44′39″W	Gatesville	
4	Leon Street Bridge at the Leon River	Leon Street Bridge at the Leon River	February 28, 2017 (#100000694)	Leon St. at Leon R. 31°25′58″N 97°45′42″W	Gatesville	Recorded Texas Historic Landmark
5	Mother Neff State Park and F. A. S. 21-B(1) Historic District	Mother Neff State Park and F. A. S. 21-B(1) Historic District	October 2, 1992 (#92001303)	Jct. of TX 236 and the Leon R. 31°18′57″N 97°28′18″W	Moody	First park in the Texas state park system; Many CCC structures in the park

== See also ==
- National Register of Historic Places listings in Texas
- Recorded Texas Historic Landmarks in Coryell County
