= United States Post Office and Courthouse (Ogden, Utah) =

- U.S. Post Office and Courthouse
- U.S. National Register of Historic Places
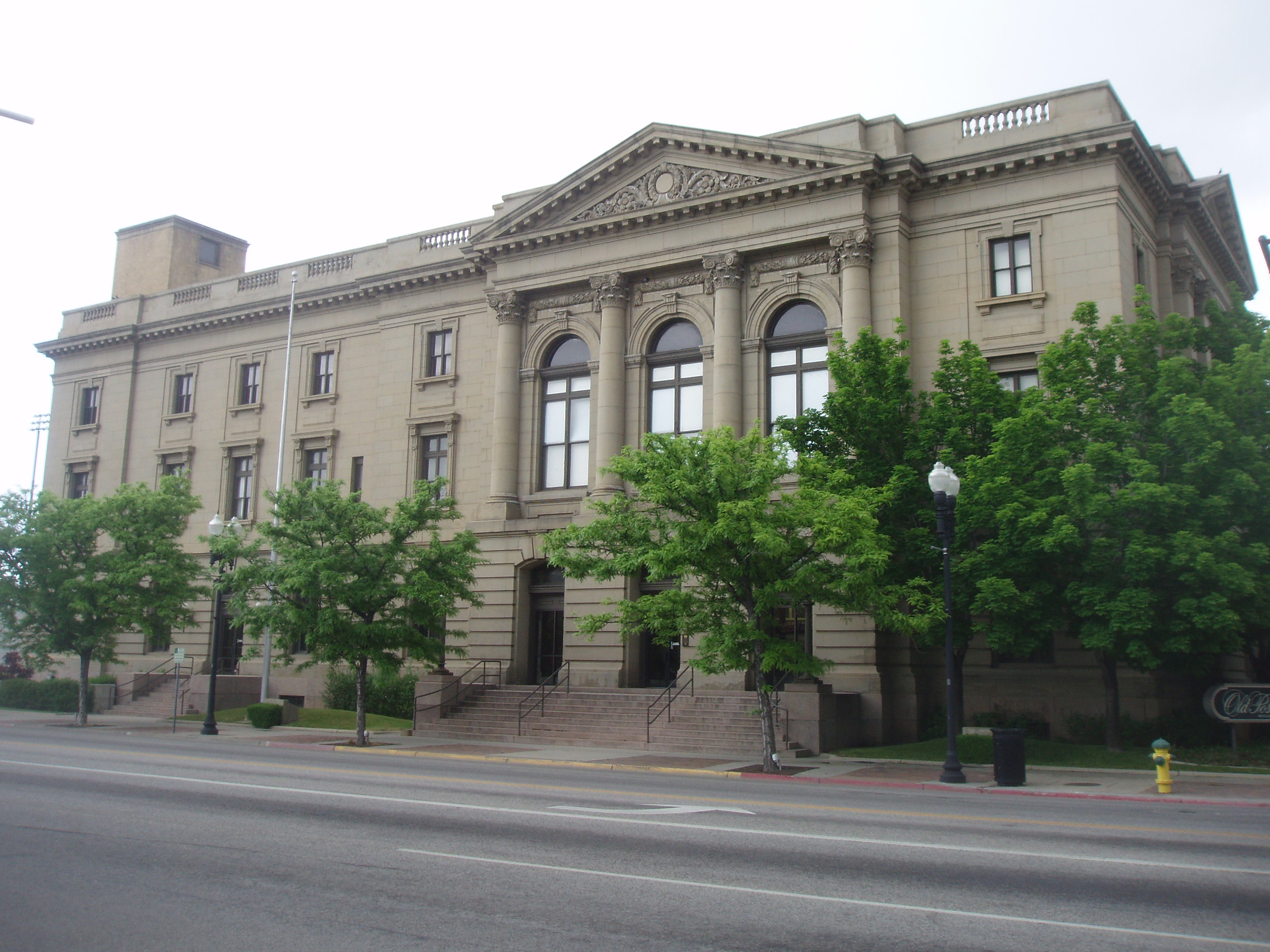

- Location within Utah Location within the United States
- Location: 298 W. 24th St., Ogden, Utah
- Coordinates: 41°13′23″N 111°58′23″W
- Area: less than one acre
- Built: 1905-1909
- Built by: Tom Lovell
- Architect: James Knox Taylor
- Architectural style: Classical Revival
- NRHP reference No.: 79002523
- Added to NRHP: July 26, 1979

The U.S. Post Office and Courthouse in Ogden, Utah, United States was built during 1905 to 1909, with Classical Revival style. It served historically as a courthouse and as a post office. It was listed on the National Register of Historic Places in 1979.

== Descriptions ==
It was built as a five-bay wide, three-story sandstone building at cost of $320,000 during 1905 to 1909. It had a central, pedimented three-bay projection on each side. It was doubled in size in 1930 with addition of four bays to the west and one to the north. Attached Corinthian columns were added to the projections.

Its interior features a marble main floor lobby and two-story courtrooms which had, as of 1978, their original wood paneling.

== See also ==
- National Register of Historic Places listings in Weber County, Utah
