= Jasper County Courthouse (Texas) =

- U.S. National Register of Historic Places
- Texas State Antiquities Landmark
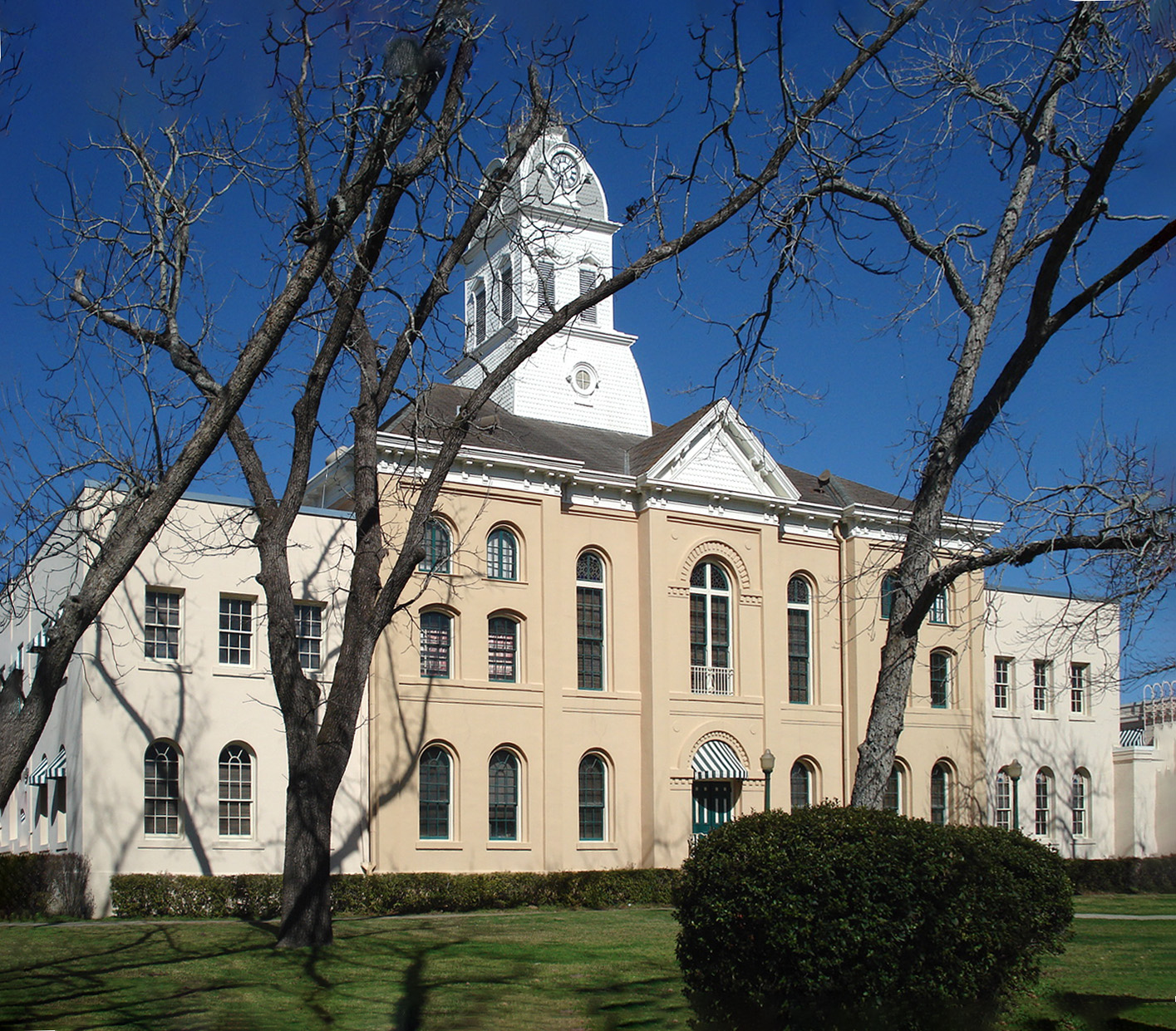
- Jasper County Courthouse in 2011

- Location within Texas Location within the United States
- Interactive map showing the location for Jasper County Courthouse
- Location: Public Sq., Jasper, Texas
- Coordinates: 30°55′17″N 94°0′0″W
- Area: 3 acres (1.2 ha)
- Built: 1889
- Architect: Eugene T. Heiner
- Architectural style: Italianate
- NRHP reference No.: 84001898
- TSAL No.: 8200000391

Significant dates
- Added to NRHP: September 6, 1984
- Designated TSAL: January 1, 1992

The Jasper County Courthouse in Jasper, Texas is a building from 1889. It was listed on the National Register of Historic Places on September 6, 1984. The courthouse was designed by Eugene T. Heiner in an Italianate style with clock tower. It was stuccoed and altered when additions were added in 1934 giving the building a Neoclassical look. The clock tower was removed in 1957. Another addition was built on in 1960.

== See also ==
- National Register of Historic Places listings in Jasper County, Texas
