= First Presbyterian Church (Palestine, Texas) =

Historic church in Texas, United States

- U.S. National Register of Historic Places
- Recorded Texas Historic Landmark
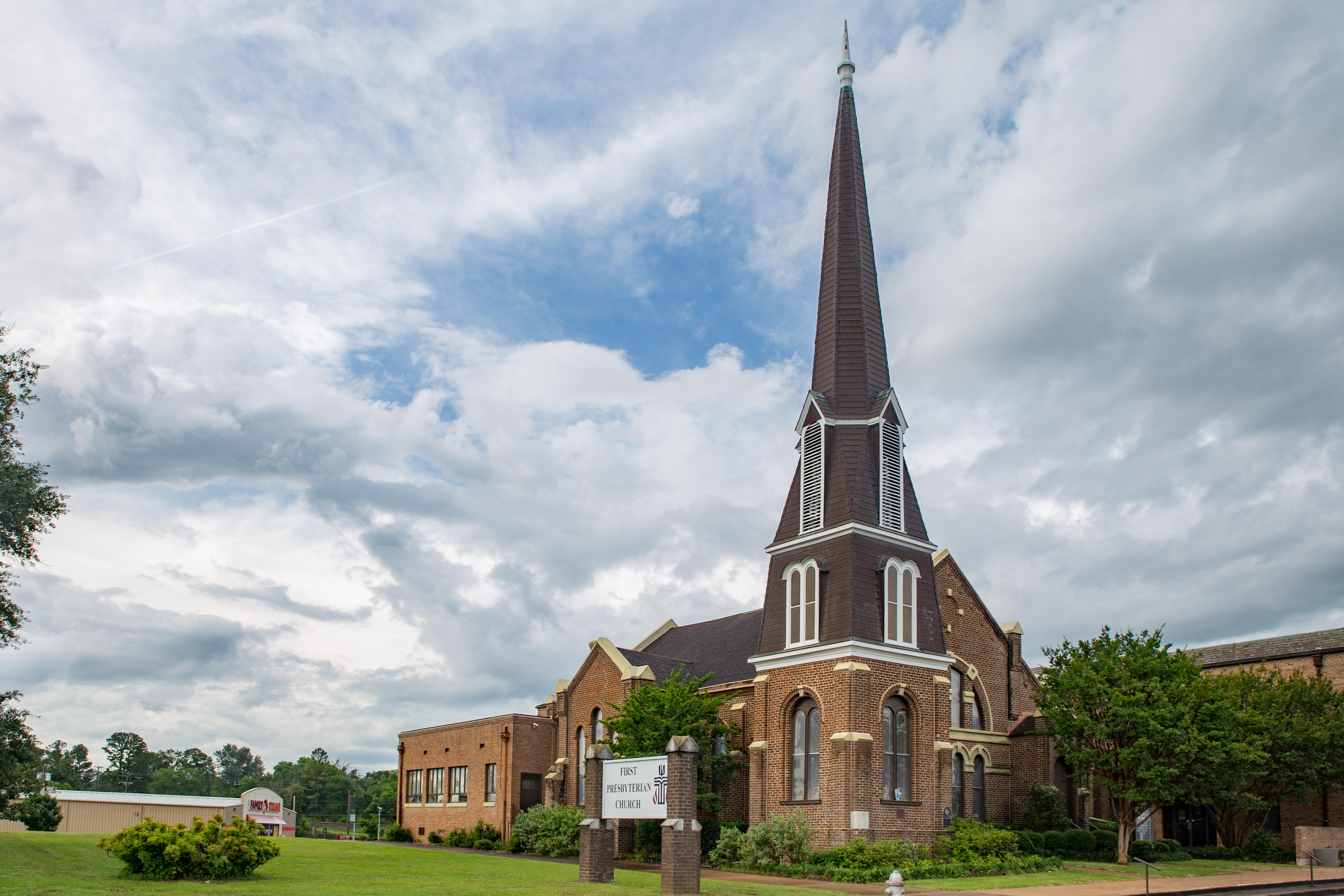
- First Presbyterian Church in 2023

- Location within Texas Location within the United States
- Location: 410 Avenue A, Palestine, Texas
- Coordinates: 31°45′45″N 95°37′44″W
- Area: less than one acre
- Built: 1887-1888
- Architect: Dodson & Dudley, et al.
- Architectural style: Gothic Revival
- Website: First Presbyterian Church of Palestine
- MPS: Palestine, Texas MPS
- NRHP reference No.: 98000695
- RTHL No.: 8751

Significant dates
- Added to NRHP: June 11, 1998
- Designated RTHL: 1966

First Presbyterian Church is a historic Presbyterian church at 410 Avenue A in Palestine, Texas.

Its congregation was organized in 1849, a year after Palestine was founded.

The Gothic Revival church building was built in 1887–88, and is the oldest church in Palestine continuously serving a congregation.

The church was added to the National Register of Historic Places in 1998.

== See also ==
- National Register of Historic Places listings in Anderson County, Texas
- Recorded Texas Historic Landmarks in Anderson County
