= Denton County Courthouse-on-the-Square =

- Denton County Courthouse
- U.S. National Register of Historic Places
- Texas State Antiquities Landmark
- Recorded Texas Historic Landmark
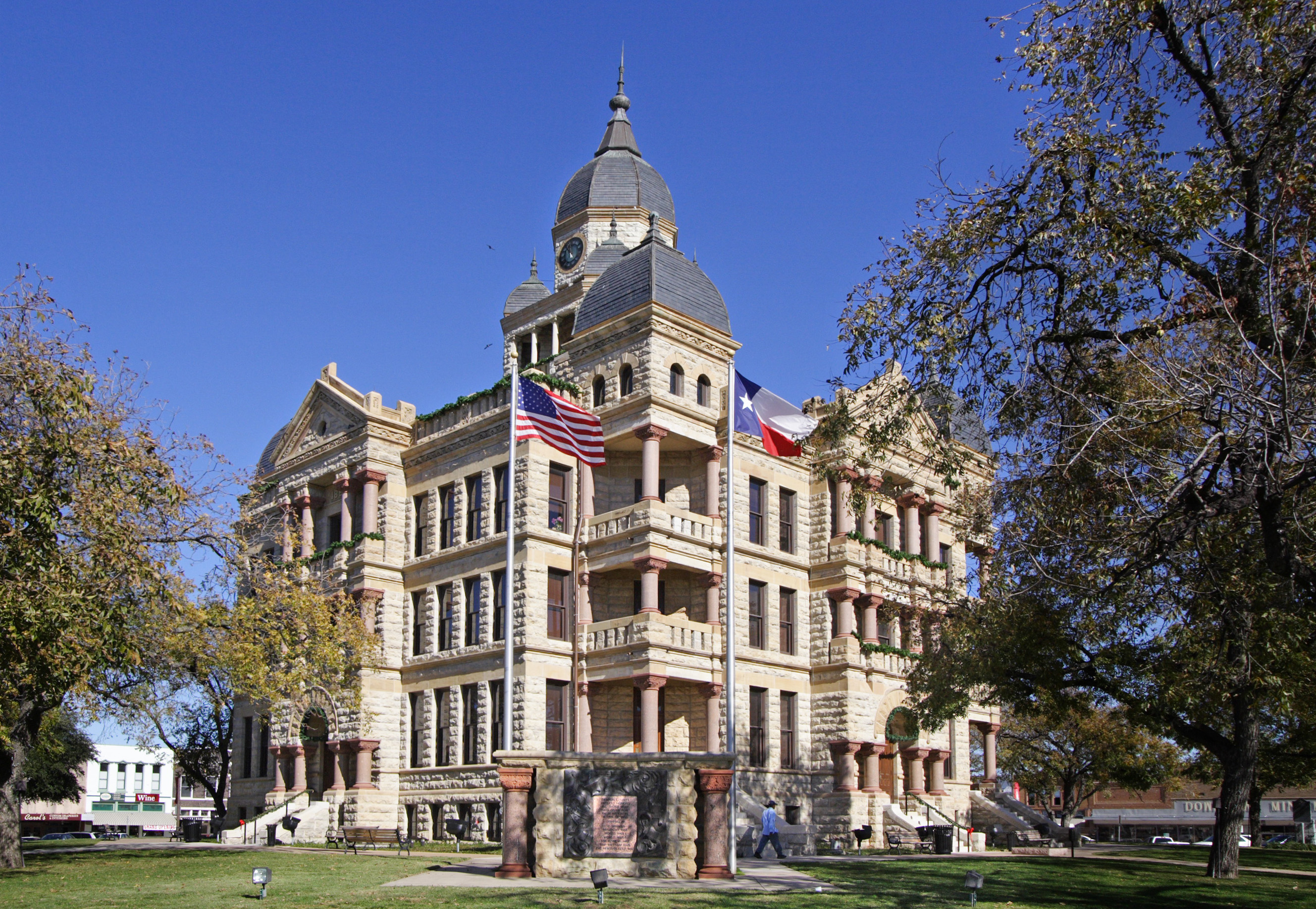
- Courthouse in 2005

- Location within Texas Location within the United States
- Interactive map showing the location for Denton County Courthouse-on-the-Square
- Location: Public Sq. Denton, Texas
- Coordinates: 33°12′54″N 97°7′58″W
- Area: 0.2 acres (0.081 ha)
- Built: 1895
- Built by: Tom Lovell
- Architect: Wesley Clark Dodson
- Architectural style: Romanesque
- NRHP reference No.: 77001438
- TSAL No.: 220
- RTHL No.: 1208

Significant dates
- Added to NRHP: December 20, 1977
- Designated TSAL: May 28, 1981
- Designated RTHL: 1970

The Denton County Courthouse-on-the-Square is the former courthouse of Denton County located in the county seat Denton, Texas. The Denton County Courthouse-on-the-Square was constructed in 1896. Tom Lovell was the building contractor. In addition to county offices, the "Courthouse-on-the-Square Museum" also calls it home. The courthouse is listed on the National Register of Historic Places.

The Courthouse is also the final resting place of John B. Denton, the county's and city's namesake.

In 1918, a monument to Confederate Soldiers was gifted to Denton by the local chapter of the United Daughters of the Confederacy and placed on the grounds of the Courthouse-on-the-Square. The monument was titled "Our Confederate Soldiers" and contained separate drinking water fountains at the base, with one side etched "whites" and the other "colored." The monument was removed on June 23, 2020, following decades of protest urging its removal, with the Denton County Commissioners citing the safety of the artifact as the reason for it being removed.

== Courthouse-on-the-Square Museum ==
The Courthouse-on-the-Square Museum is located at the Denton County Courthouse-on-the-Square. The museum is one of three Denton County museums, which also include the Bayless-Selby House Museum, and the Denton County African American Museum - both of which are located offsite.

The Courthouse-on-the-Square Museum focuses on the history and culture of Denton County. Exhibits include African American and Hispanic heritage, farming, weapons, dolls, Southwest American Indian and Denton County pottery, furniture, and special collections of American pressed blue glass, thimbles, Pecan folk art and quilts.

== See also ==
- National Register of Historic Places listings in Denton County, Texas
- Recorded Texas Historic Landmarks in Denton County
- List of county courthouses in Texas
