= Coryell County Courthouse =

- U.S. National Register of Historic Places
- Texas State Antiquities Landmark
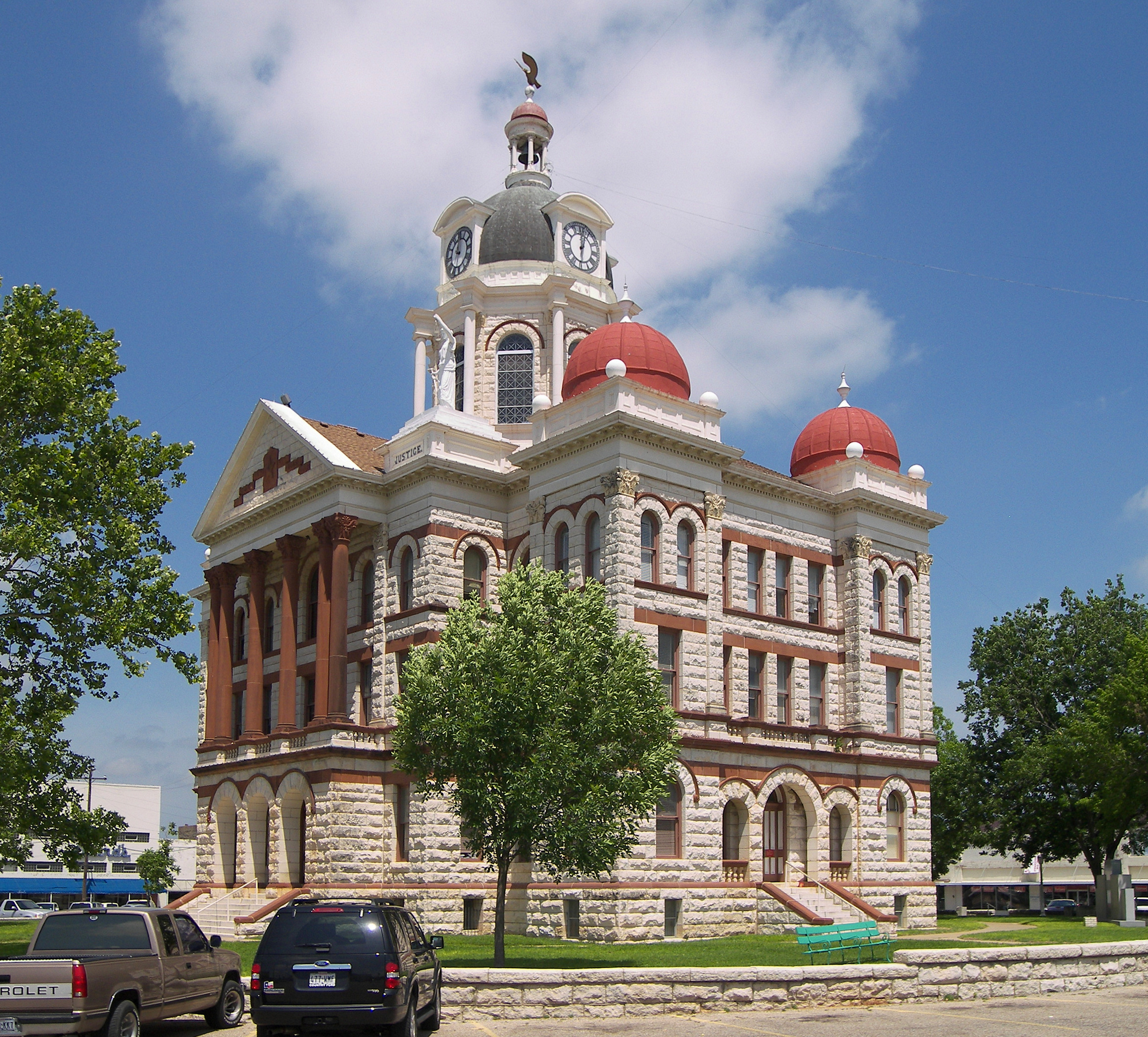
- Coryell County Courthouse

- Location within Texas Location within the United States
- Interactive map showing the location for Coryell County Courthouse
- Location: Public Sq., Gatesville, Texas
- Coordinates: 31°26′4″N 97°45′2″W
- Area: 2 acres (0.81 ha)
- Built: 1897–1898
- Built by: Tom Lovell
- Architect: W.C. Dodson
- Architectural style: Romanesque, Italian Renaissance Revival
- NRHP reference No.: 77001435
- TSAL No.: 8200000186

Significant dates
- Added to NRHP: August 18, 1977
- Designated TSAL: January 1, 1981

The Coryell County Courthouse is an historic building located at Courthouse Square in Gatesville, Texas, the seat of Coryell County. Built in 1897–98, it was the county's third courthouse. Architect Wesley Clark Dodson, a designer of many civil buildings in Texas, designed the Beaux Arts building. The construction contract was awarded to Tom Lovell of Denton, Texas. In his design, Dodson modified the traditional cross-axial plan to allow for the erection of a central tower. By moving the district courtroom to a position alongside the tower rather than centered underneath it, he was able to extend the masonry support walls to the ground and support the tower. An important feature of the court house is the Massive Classical porticos, differing somewhat in scale and treatment, define the north and south entries. The south portico has paired corner columns, while the north has single columns. The porticos rise from a one-story base of rusticated stone with arched entries in the lower level. The openings flanking the central arch are smaller on the north facade. Red sandstone Corinthian columns support white sandstone pediments, with the five pointed star of Texas inset in contrasting carved stone.

The courthouse was added to the National Register of Historic Places in 1977.

== See also ==
- National Register of Historic Places listings in Coryell County, Texas
