= Colorado County Courthouse =

- U.S. National Register of Historic Places
- U.S. Historic district – Contributing property
- Texas State Antiquities Landmark
- Recorded Texas Historic Landmark
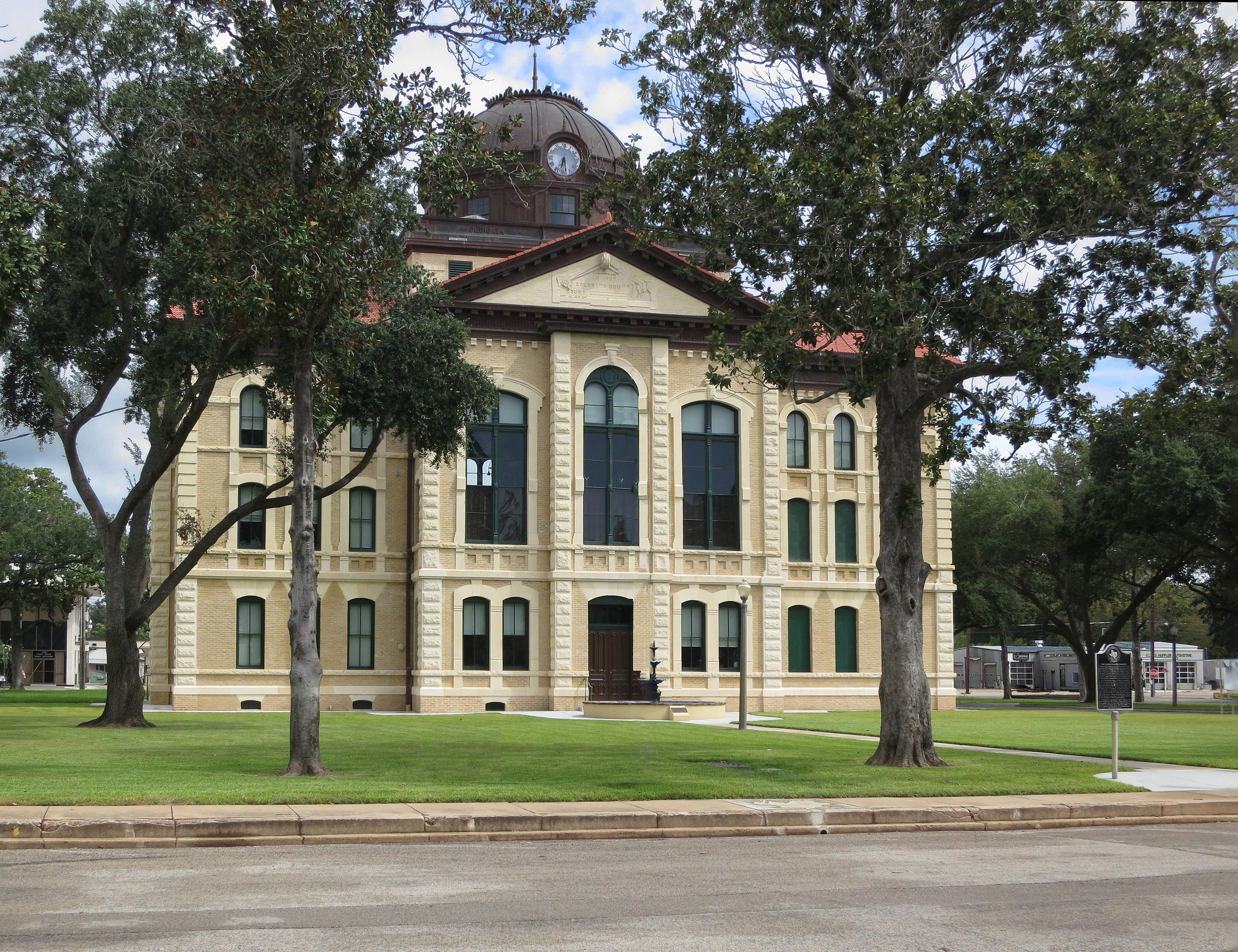
- Colorado County Courthouse, built 1890-1891: this 2014 photo shows restoration to original color scheme made in 2013

- Location within Texas Location within the United States
- Interactive map showing the location of Colorado County Courthouse
- Location: 400 Spring St., Columbus, Texas
- Coordinates: 29°42′21″N 96°32′23″W
- Area: 1 acre (0.40 ha)
- Built: 1890
- Architect: Eugene T. Heiner
- Architectural style: Classical Revival, Greek Revival
- Part of: Colorado County Courthouse Historic District (ID78002907)
- NRHP reference No.: 76002015
- TSAL No.: 8200000174
- RTHL No.: 8829

Significant dates
- Added to NRHP: July 12, 1976
- Designated CP: June 23, 1978
- Designated TSAL: January 1, 1981
- Designated RTHL: 1969

The Colorado County Courthouse, built in 1890, is a historic government building located at 400 Spring Street in Columbus, Colorado County, Texas. It was designed in a combination of Classical Revival and Italianate styles of architecture by noted Houston architect Eugene T. Heiner, who designed at least nine other Texas courthouses. Colorado County's fourth courthouse, it originally had a central bell tower which was replaced before 1939 by a central domed Tiffany-style skylight. On July 12, 1976, it was added to the National Register of Historic Places. It was renovated in 2013, when historic colors were restored. It is still in use today as a courthouse.

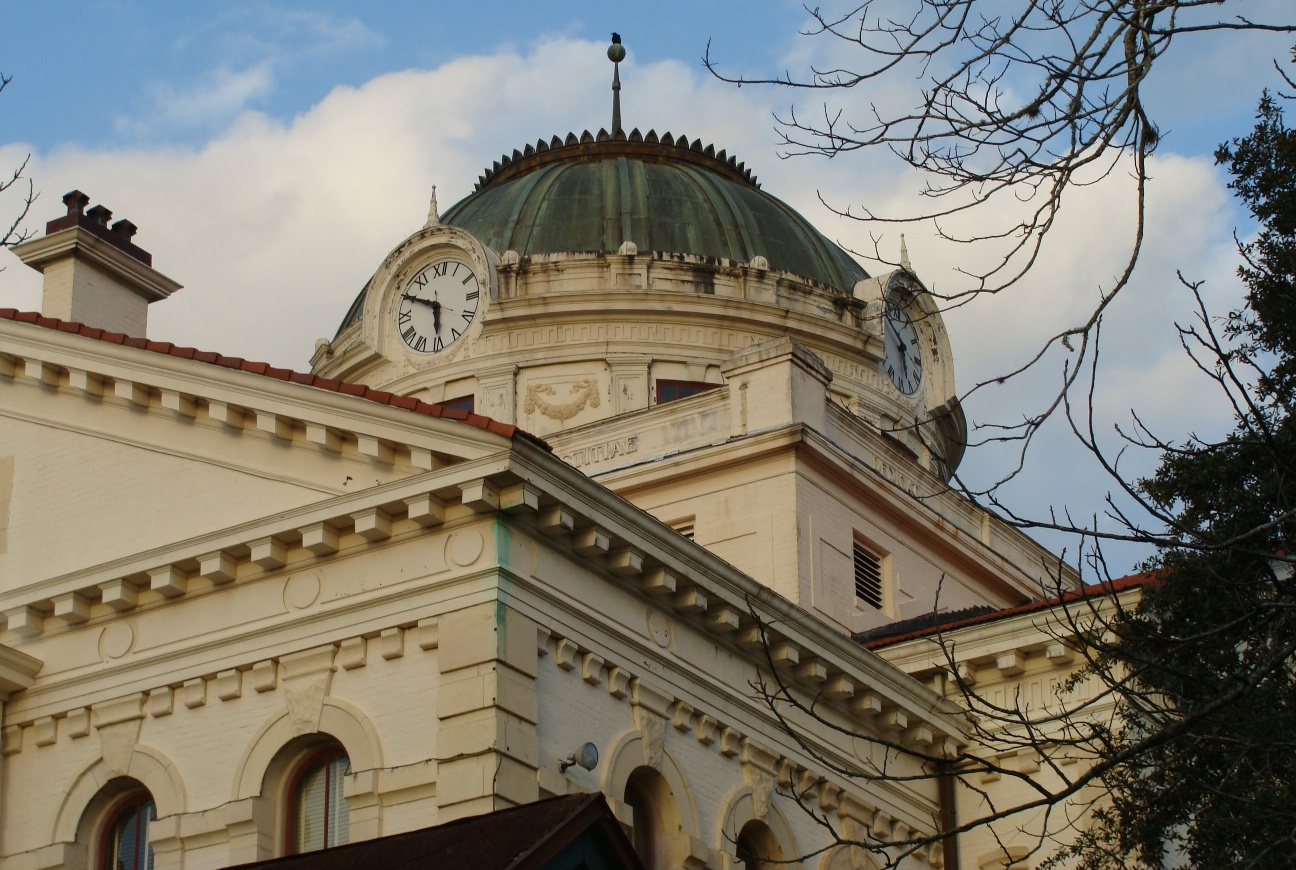
Detail of dome

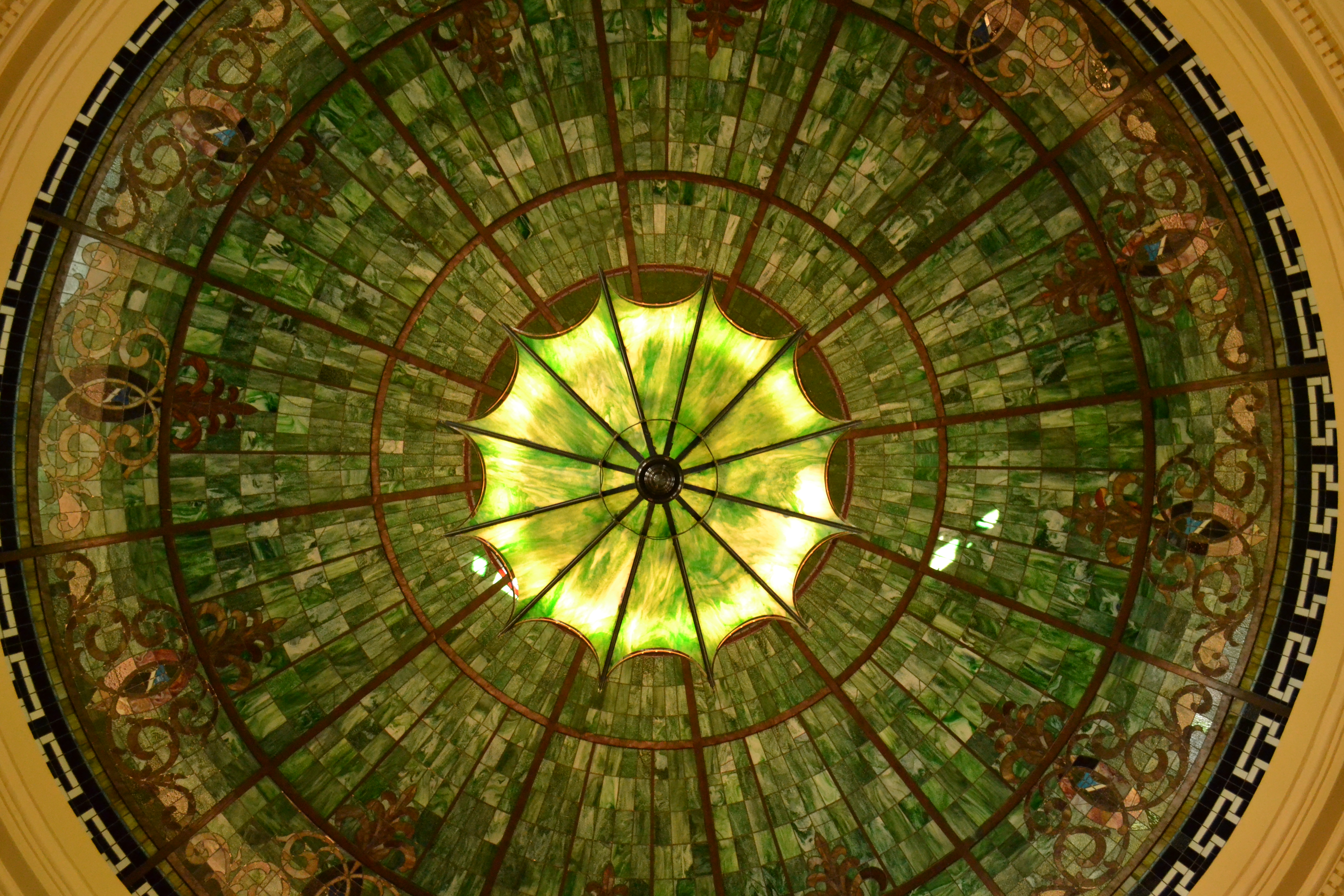
The dome inside the main courtroom

== See also ==
- National Register of Historic Places listings in Colorado County, Texas
- Recorded Texas Historic Landmarks in Colorado County
- List of county courthouses in Texas
