= Howard House (Palestine, Texas) =

Historic house in Texas, United States

- U.S. National Register of Historic Places
- Recorded Texas Historic Landmark
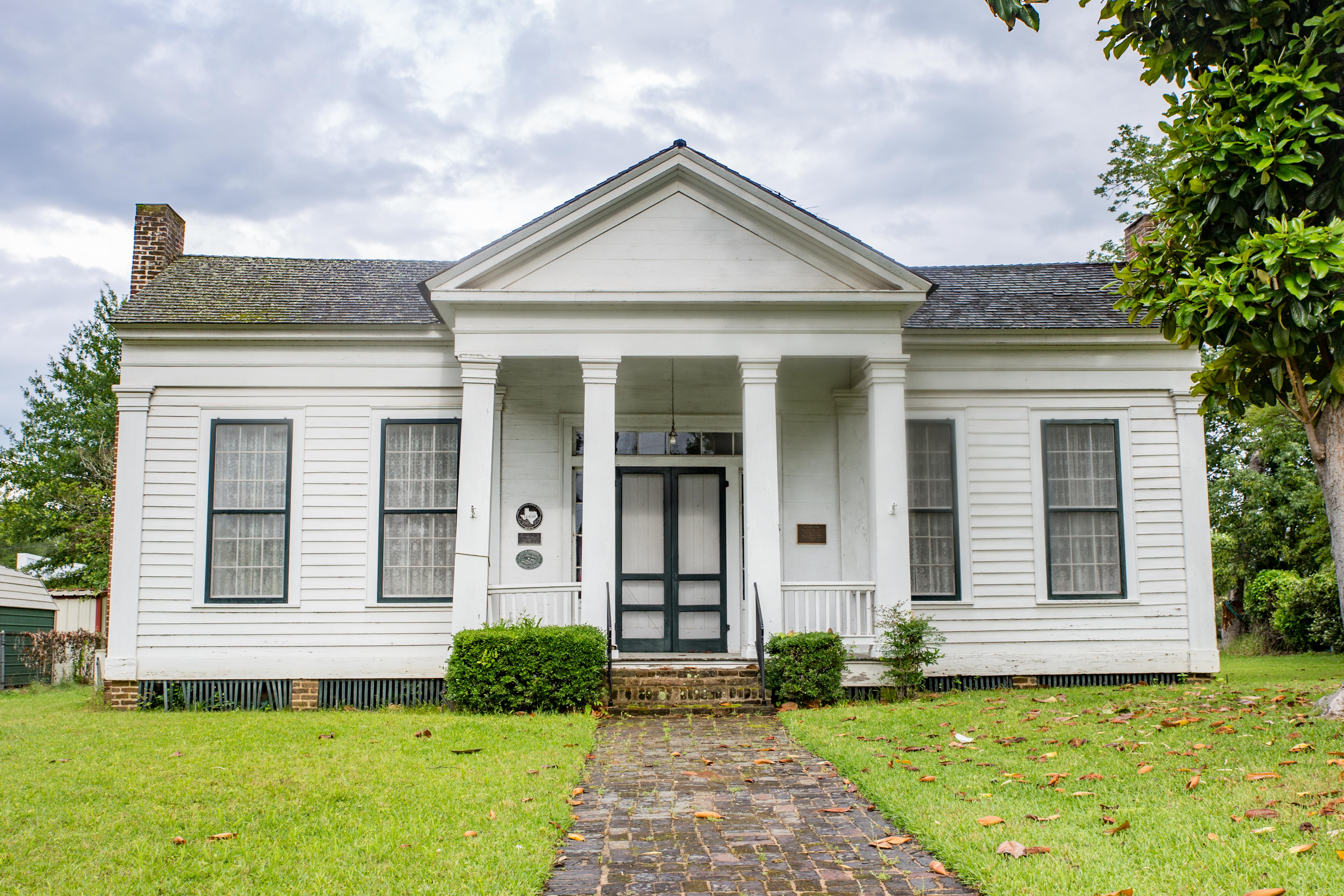
- Howard House in 2023

- Location within Texas Location within the United States
- Interactive map showing the location of Howard House
- Location: 1011 N. Perry St., Palestine, Texas
- Coordinates: 31°46′11″N 95°37′34″W
- Area: less than one acre
- Built: 1848
- Architect: James Bunda
- Architectural style: Greek Revival
- NRHP reference No.: 93000072
- RTHL No.: 8766

Significant dates
- Added to NRHP: March 14, 1993
- Designated RTHL: 1966

Howard House in Palestine, Texas was built in 1848 by Reuben A. Reeves, Texas State Supreme Court Justice, and justice of the Supreme Court of the New Mexico Territory. When Reeves moved away from Palestine in 1850, the house was purchased by local merchant George R. Howard. Attaining the rank of colonel from his service with the Tennessee State Militia, Howard also served with the Confederate States Army. As a civilian, Howard served in numerous state and local elected positions, including as mayor of Palestine. Upon the deaths of Howard and his wife, the house was inherited by their son Thomas S. Howard. The city of Palestine purchased the house as a museum in 1964. It was listed on the NRHP in 1993.

The Howard House Museum is owned by the city and furnished for a late 19th-century appearance. It is open for tours and special functions by appointment.

== See also ==
- National Register of Historic Places listings in Anderson County, Texas
- Recorded Texas Historic Landmarks in Anderson County
