= Houston Cotton Exchange Building =

Historic building in Houston, Texas, U.S.

- 1884 Houston Cotton Exchange Building
- U.S. National Register of Historic Places
- Recorded Texas Historic Landmark
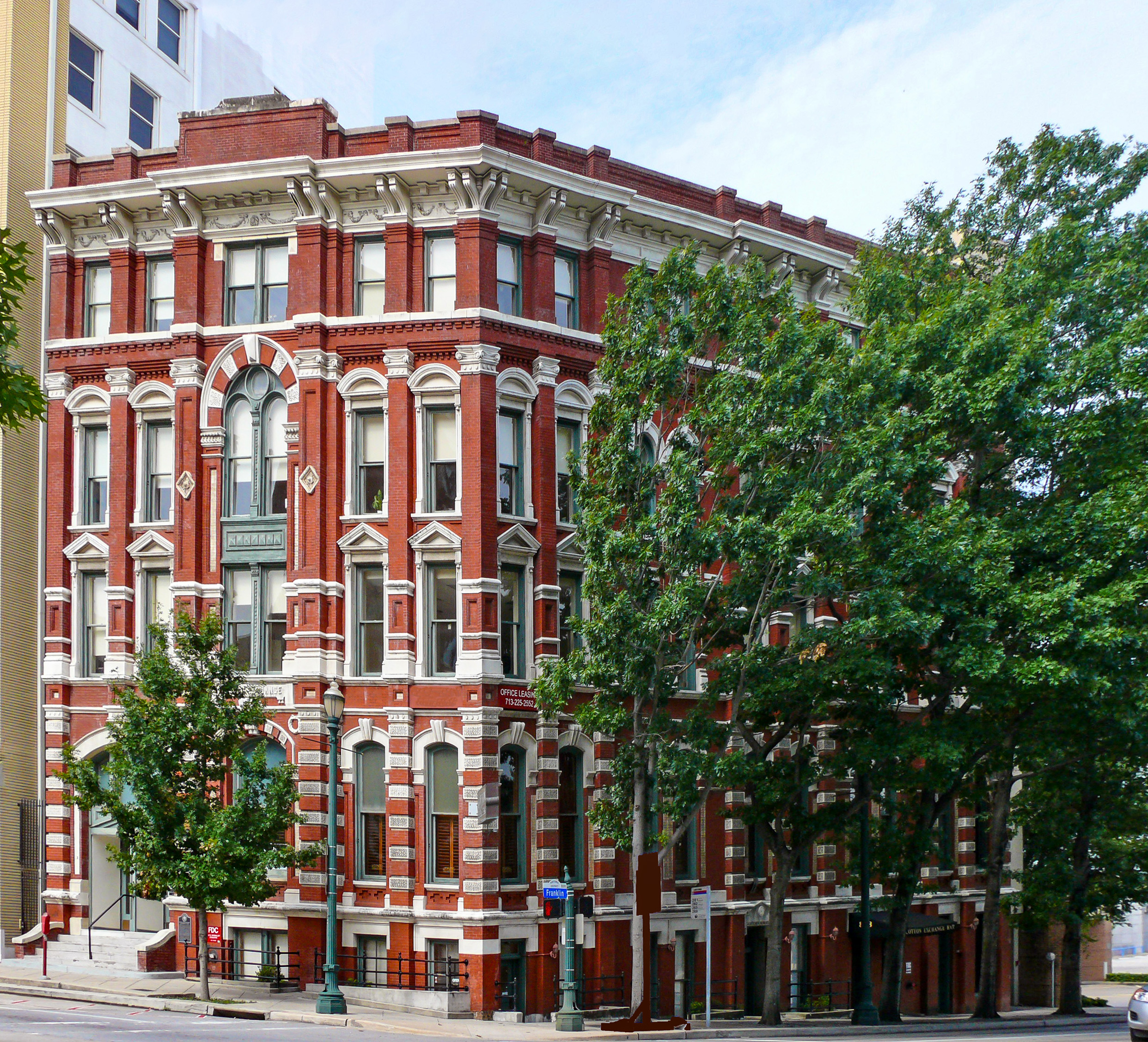
- The building's exterior in 2012

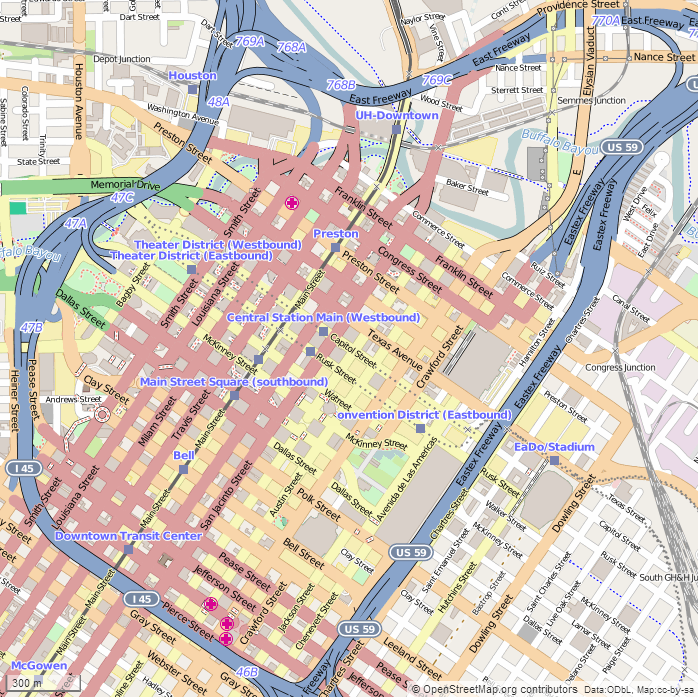
- Location within Houston Downtown Location within Texas Location within the United States
- Location: 202 Travis St., Houston, Texas
- Coordinates: 29.7635°N 95.3613°W
- Area: 0.2 acres (0.081 ha)
- Built: 1884
- Architect: Eugene Heiner
- Architectural style: Renaissance, Romanesque
- NRHP reference No.: 71000938
- RTHL No.: 10693

Significant dates
- Added to NRHP: May 6, 1971
- Designated RTHL: 1974

The Cotton Exchange Building is a historic building located in Downtown Houston.

== History ==
Built in 1884, the Cotton Exchange Building is listed on the National Register of Historic Places. The Houston Cotton Exchange and Board of Trade commissioned local architect Eugene Heiner to design a three-story building on Travis Street at the corner of Franklin in Houston. In 1907, the building was remodeled and a fourth floor added. The Houston Cotton Exchange continued to use the building until it moved its operations to a new building several blocks away at Prairie and Caroline in 1924.

John Hannah and Jesse Edmundson, III purchased the Cotton Exchange Building in 1973. They restored the building and sold it in 1983. Preservation Houston acknowledged Hannah's restoration work in 1979 with a Good Brick Award.

== Gallery ==
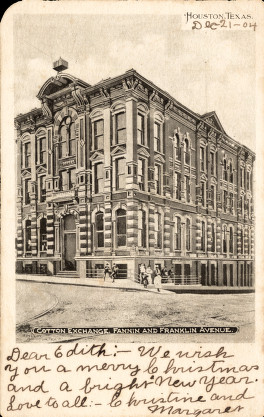
postcard, circa 1904

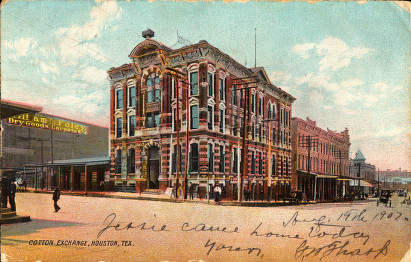
postcard, circa 1907

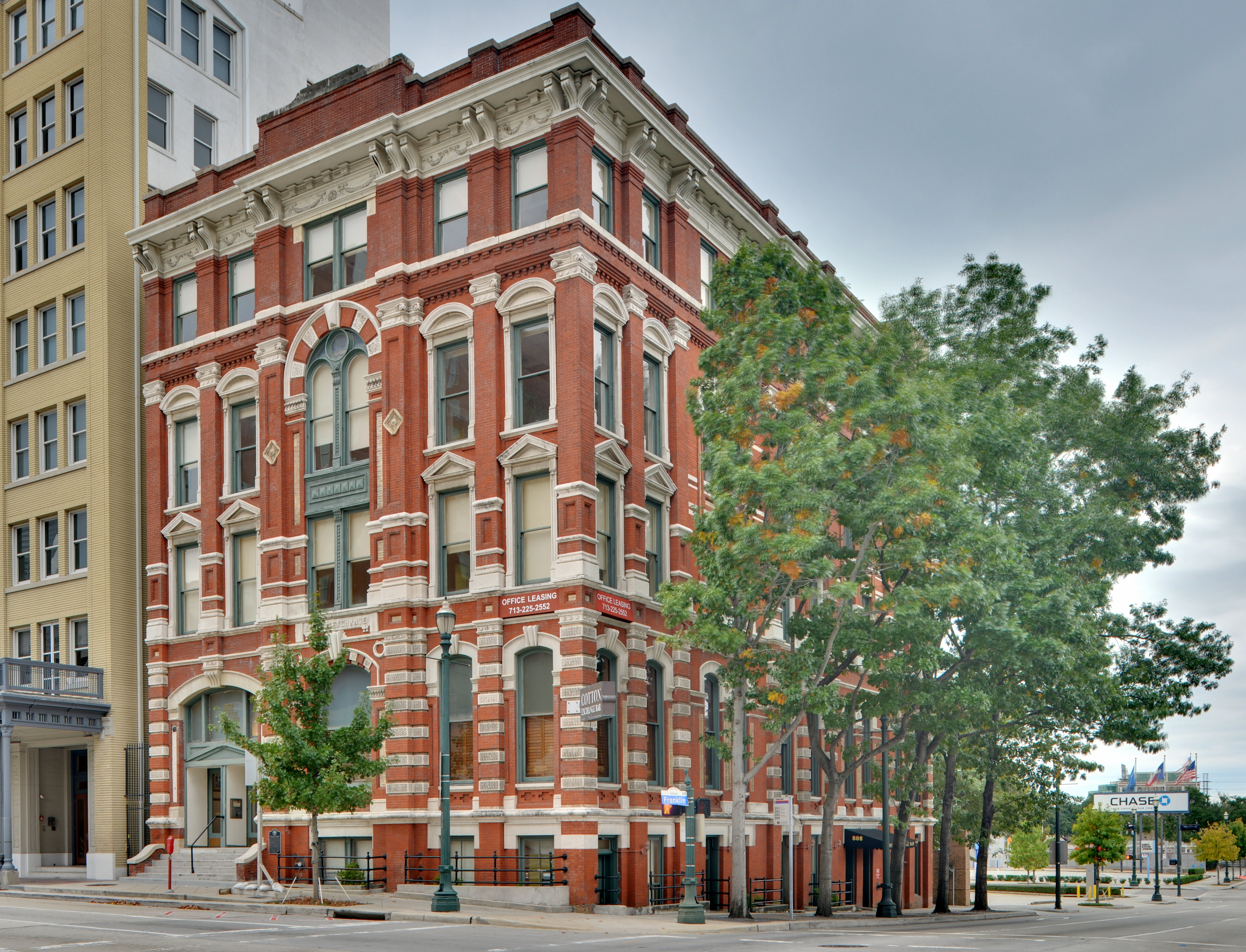

== See also ==
- National Register of Historic Places listings in Harris County, Texas

== Bibliography ==
- Bradley, Barrie Scardino (2020). Improbable Metropolis: Houston's Architectural and Urban History. Austin: University of Texas Press. ISBN 978-1-4773-2019-8.
- Fox, Stephen (2012). AIA Houston Architectural Guide (Third ed.). Houston: American Institute of Architects, Houston Chapter. ISBN 978-0-615-66959-5.
