= Mount Vernon African Methodist Episcopal Church (Palestine, Texas) =

Historic church in Texas, United States

- U.S. National Register of Historic Places
- Recorded Texas Historic Landmark
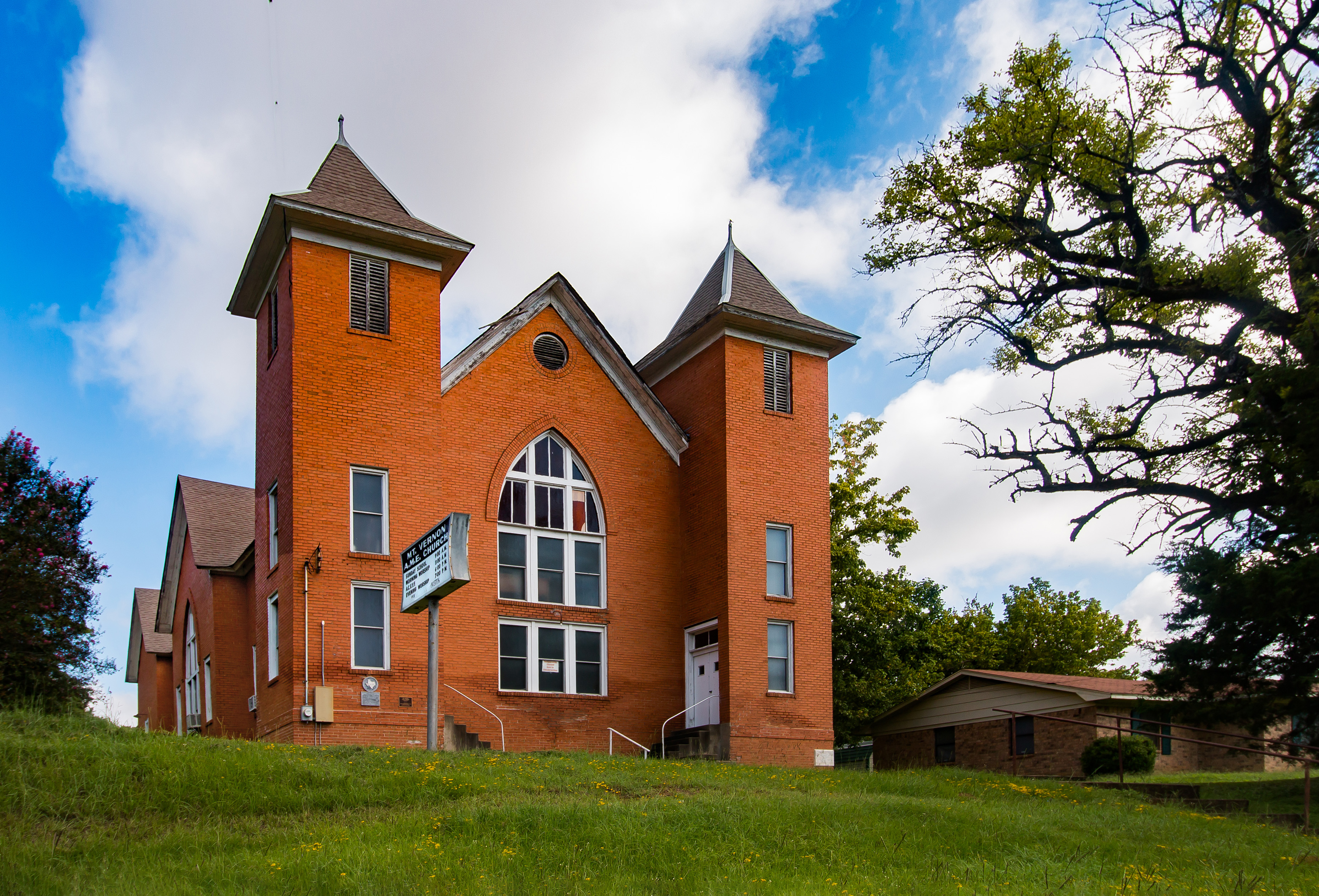
- Mount Vernon AME Church in 2016

- Location within Texas Location within the United States
- Location: 913 E. Calhoun St., Palestine, Texas
- Coordinates: 31°46′5″N 95°37′22″W
- Area: less than one acre
- Built: 1921
- Architect: J.B. Rountree
- Architectural style: Late Gothic Revival
- MPS: Palestine, Texas MPS
- NRHP reference No.: 98000635
- RTHL No.: 8782

Significant dates
- Added to NRHP: June 3, 1998
- Designated RTHL: 1986

Mount Vernon African Methodist Episcopal Church is a historic church at 913 East Calhoun Street in Palestine, Texas. It is the third oldest AME church in Texas. The church was organized by freedmen in the early 1870s. The congregation originally worshiped at a church that it shared with Missionary Baptist Church. In 1878 the church bought 2.2 acres at its present location and constructed a wood-frame structure in 1885. In 1921 the structure was razed and a new church designed in a Gothic vernacular style was built. The church's two front bell towers are typical of the AME faith-based churches of the 1920s. Mount Vernon was the first church to introduce Palestine to integrated low-income apartment housing. In 1968 a 100-unit apartment housing project was erected at 2020 Sterne Avenue. In 1986 the church was designated a Recorded Texas Historic Landmark.

In 1988 it was placed on the National Register of Historic Places.

The church building closed its doors in 2014 because the building was in serious disrepair and the congregation moved to another nearby church. In 2015, Mount Vernon was placed on the Most Endangered Places list maintained by Preservation Texas. The Texas Historical Commission awarded a $10,000 grant for restoration, and the congregation raised an additional $10,000 to match the state grant. At that point, they estimated they still needed an additional $30,000 to complete the project.

In 2023, Preservation Texas awarded the church a $75,000 grant to repair structural issues with the building. The grant required matching funds, which were provided with $15,000 from the Palestine Economic Development Corporation and $10,000 from the AME Church.

The building is brick with Gothic Revival details.

== See also ==
- National Register of Historic Places listings in Anderson County, Texas
- Recorded Texas Historic Landmarks in Anderson County
