= Lavaca County Courthouse =

- U.S. National Register of Historic Places
- Texas State Antiquities Landmark
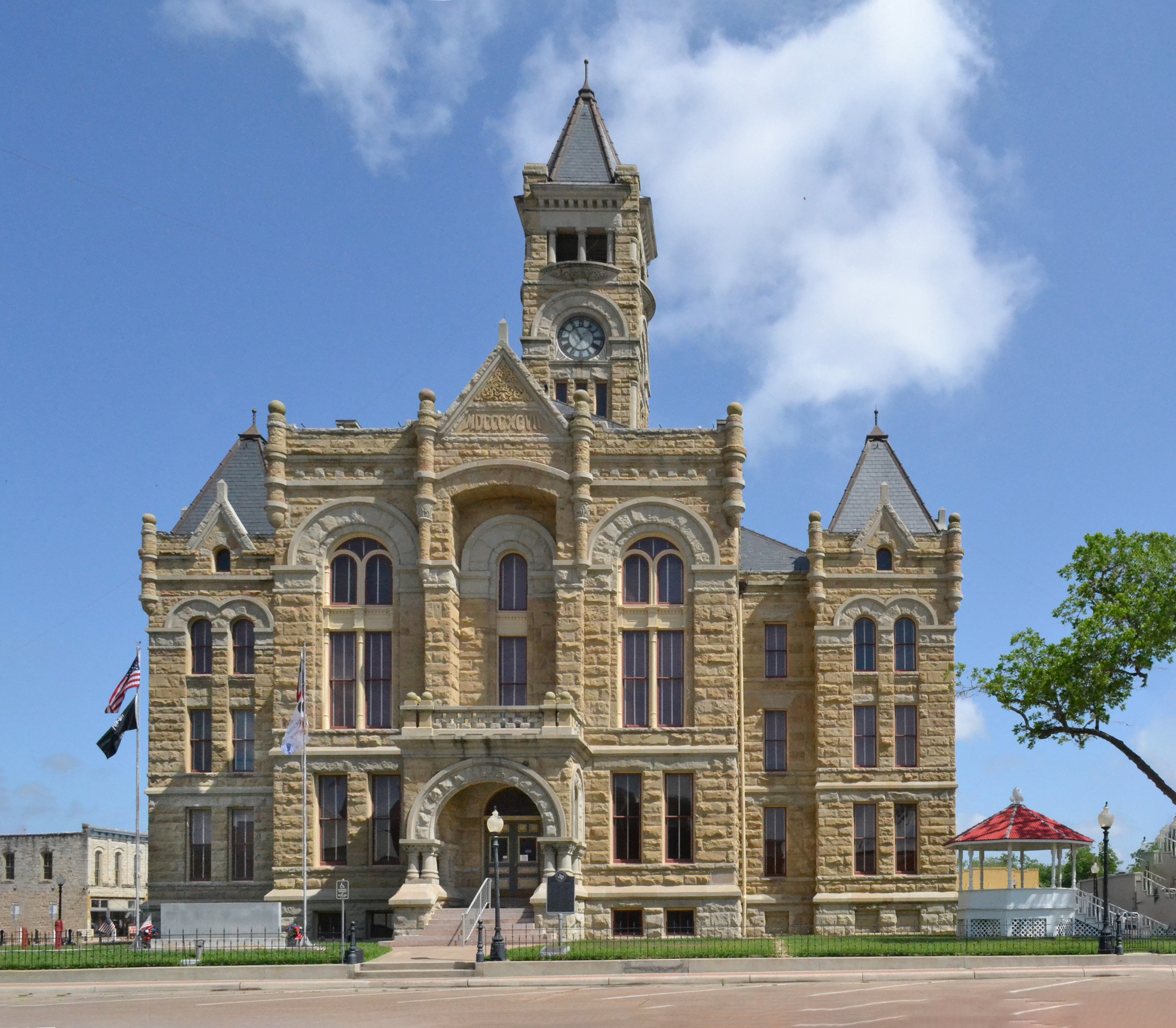
- Lavaca County Courthouse in 2014

- Location within Texas Location within the United States
- Location: Bounded by LaGrange, 2nd, 3rd, and Main Sts., Hallettsville, Texas
- Coordinates: 29°26′41″N 96°56′33″W
- Area: 0.5 acres (0.20 ha)
- Built: 1897-1899
- Built by: A.T. Lucas
- Architect: Eugene T. Heiner
- Architectural style: Richardsonian Romanesque
- NRHP reference No.: 71000945
- TSAL No.: 8200001135

Significant dates
- Added to NRHP: March 11, 1971
- Designated TSAL: January 1, 1981

The Lavaca County Courthouse, in Hallettsville, Texas, is a courthouse which was built in 1897. It was listed on the National Register of Historic Places in 1971.

It is the fifth structure serving as county seat for Lavaca County, originally "La Baca" County.

It was designed by architect Eugene T. Heiner.

It is a Richardsonian Romanesque-style courthouse, "strongly influenced" by H.H. Richardson's design of the Allegheny County Courthouse in Pittsburgh, Pennsylvania. It is a raised three-story limestone building, cruciform in plan, with a hipped roof and pyramidal roofs and dormers.

It is a Texas State Antiquities Landmark.

== See also ==
- National Register of Historic Places listings in Lavaca County, Texas
- List of county courthouses in Texas
