= Old Brazoria County Courthouse =

- Old Brazoria Courthouse
- U.S. National Register of Historic Places
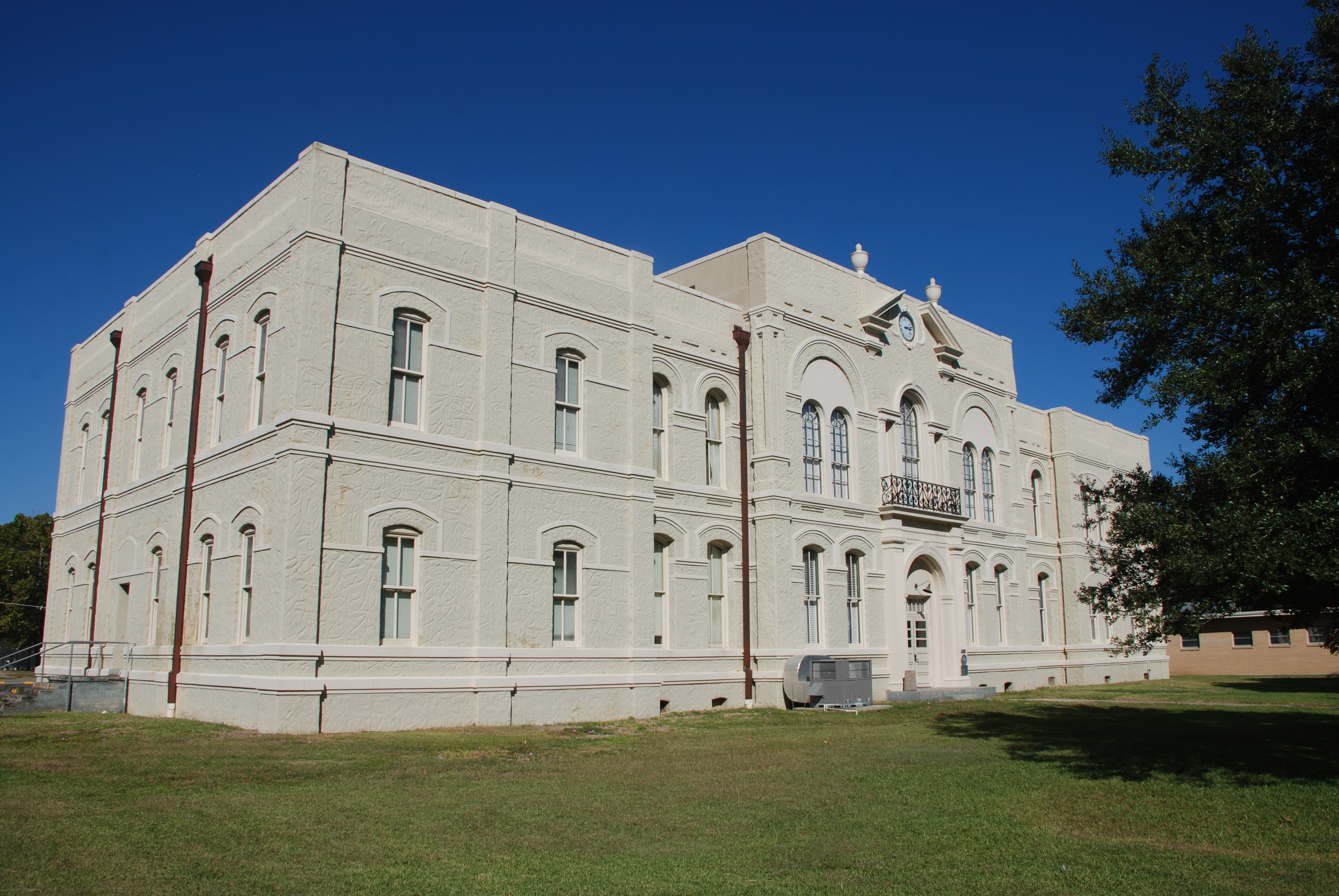
- Old Brazoria Courthouse (2014)

- Location within Texas Location within the United States
- Interactive map showing the location for Old Brazoria County Courthouse
- Location: 111 E Locust St., Angleton, Texas
- Coordinates: 29°10′03″N 95°25′51″W
- Built: 1897
- Built by: Tom Lovell
- Architect: Eugene T. Heiner
- Architectural style: Italianate
- NRHP reference No.: 79002922
- Added to NRHP: March 12, 1979

The Old Brazoria County Courthouse is a historic courthouse in Angleton, Texas. It is listed on the National Register of Historic Places.

== History ==
The courthouse was designed by Eugene T. Heiner and was constructed by Tom Lovell in 1897. It was added to the National Register of Historic Places in 1979, and designated a Texas Historic Landmark in 1983.

== See also ==
- National Register of Historic Places listings in Brazoria County, Texas
