= W. L. Foley Building =

Historic building in Houston, Texas, U.S.

- U.S. National Register of Historic Places
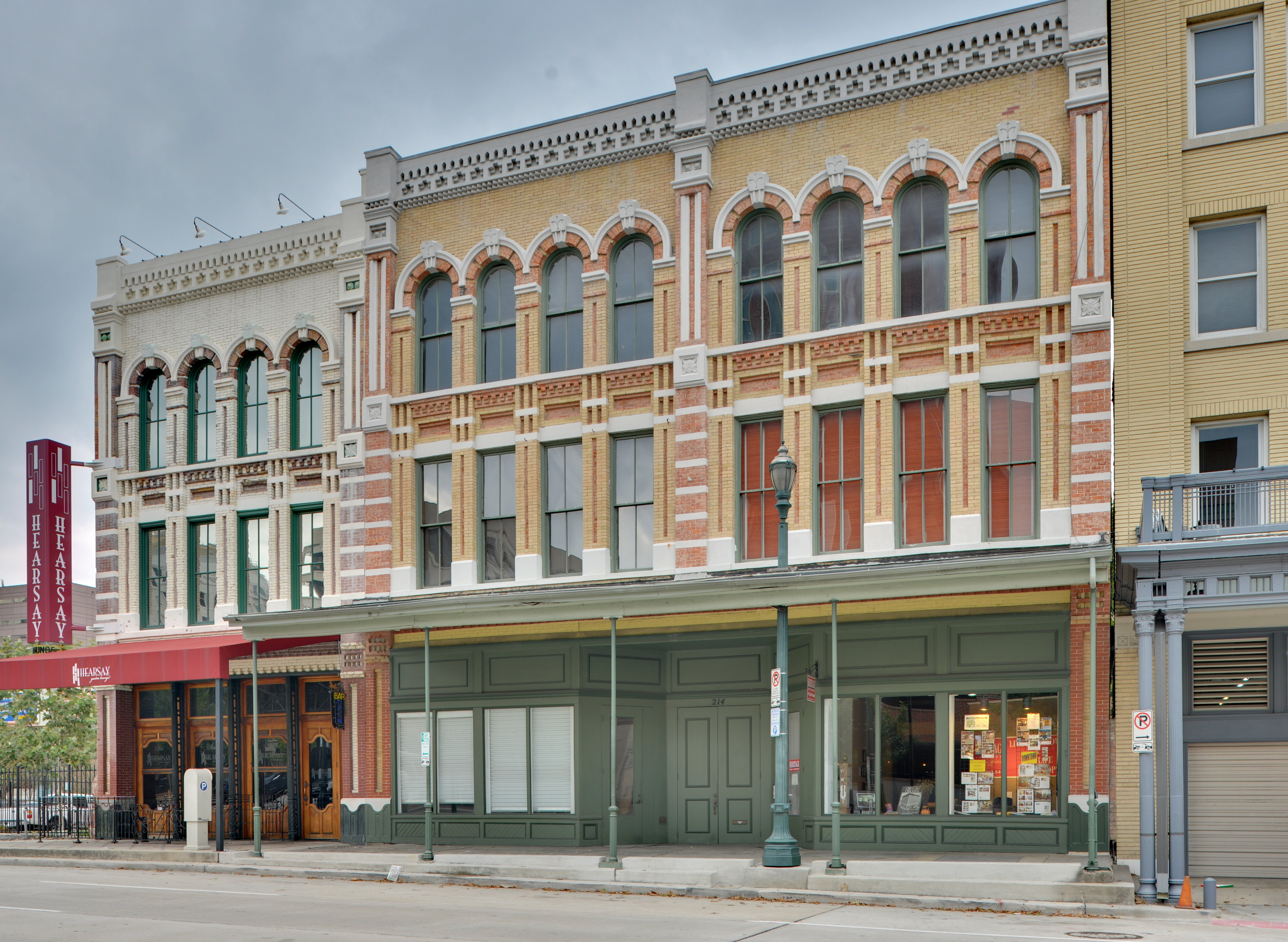

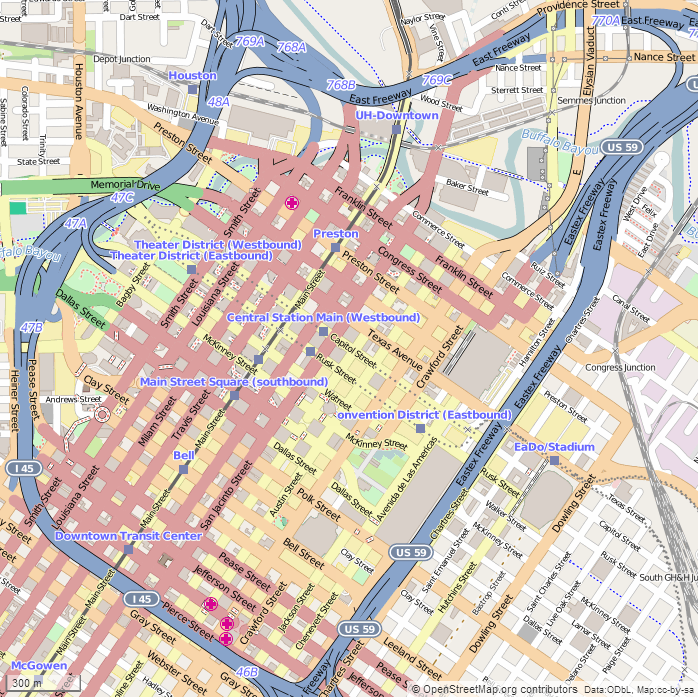
- Location within Houston Downtown Location within Texas Location within the United States
- Location: 214-218 Travis St., Houston, Texas
- Coordinates: 29°45′47″N 95°21′41″W
- Area: less than one acre
- Built: 1860
- Architect: Heiner, Eugene T.; Lucas, John
- NRHP reference No.: 78002942
- Added to NRHP: October 11, 1978

The W. L. Foley Building at 214-218 Travis St. in Houston, Texas was originally built in 1860 and reconstructed after a fire in 1889. The reconstruction was designed by architect Eugene T. Heiner. The building was listed on the National Register of Historic Places in 1978. It burned a second time in 1989 and was reconstructed by artist and architect Lee Benner in 1994.
