= Brushy Creek, Anderson County, Texas =

Brushy Creek, Texas
- Unincorporated community
- Location within Texas Location within the United States
- Coordinates: 31°57′28″N 95°36′54″W
- Country: United States
- State: Texas
- County: Anderson
- Elevation: 456 ft (139 m)
- Time zone: UTC-6 (Central (CST))
  - Summer (DST): UTC-5 (CDT)
- Area codes: 430 & 903
- GNIS feature ID: 1379464

Brushy Creek is an unincorporated community in Anderson County, located in the U.S. state of Texas. According to the Handbook of Texas, the community had a population of 50 in 2000. It is located within the Palestine, Texas micropolitan area.

== History ==
The area around Brushy Creek was settled about 1840 as part of Frankston and Montalba. Settlers from South Carolina ended a long wagon train journey here in 1873 and named it Bushy Creek. A post office by that name was established that same year. Sources differ as to whether the community and post office was named for the nearby Brushy Creek or named by a settler, Charles Murphy, for his origin in South Carolina. The settlement had three churches, steam-powered gins and gristmills, grain and livestock that were shipped into the community, and a population of 300 settlers by 1884. A sawmill was built in the community in 1890 and it had a population of 100 inhabitants, as well as two coal mines operating just west of Brushy Creek. In 1900, it had a population of 131 inhabitants, and a year later, it had a Masonic lodge. Telephone service began operating in the community 13 years later, in 1914. The population returned to 100 and remained at that level from 1925 to 1948. The post office shut down in 1925. There were two churches, two to four businesses, and several homes in the 1930s and 1940s. The community lost 70% of its population in the late 1940s and 1950s, but the development of several oilfields in the community in the early 1960s caused a revival in the community. The population of the community then grew dramatically to 200 residents in 1964. The boom looked to be temporary, as the community's population plunged to 70 from 1970 to 1988. It had two churches, the Pisgah church, and Brushy Creek church, as well as several homes in 1982. Both of these churches were still standing in 1985. Its population in both 1990 and 2000 was 50.

The Anderson Camp Ground in the community is listed on the National Register of Historic Places.

== Geography ==
Brushy Creek stands at the junction of Farm to Market Road 315 and 837 on a tributary of Brushy Creek, 13 mi (21 km) northeast of Palestine in northeastern Anderson County.

== Education ==
Brushy Creek had its own school in 1884. The community's schools in 1932 served 102 White students and 82 African American students living in the community. It had two schools in the 1930s and 1940s. Today the community is served by the Frankston Independent School District.
