= Hill County Courthouse =

Courthouse building in Hillsboro, Hill County, Texas

- U.S. National Register of Historic Places
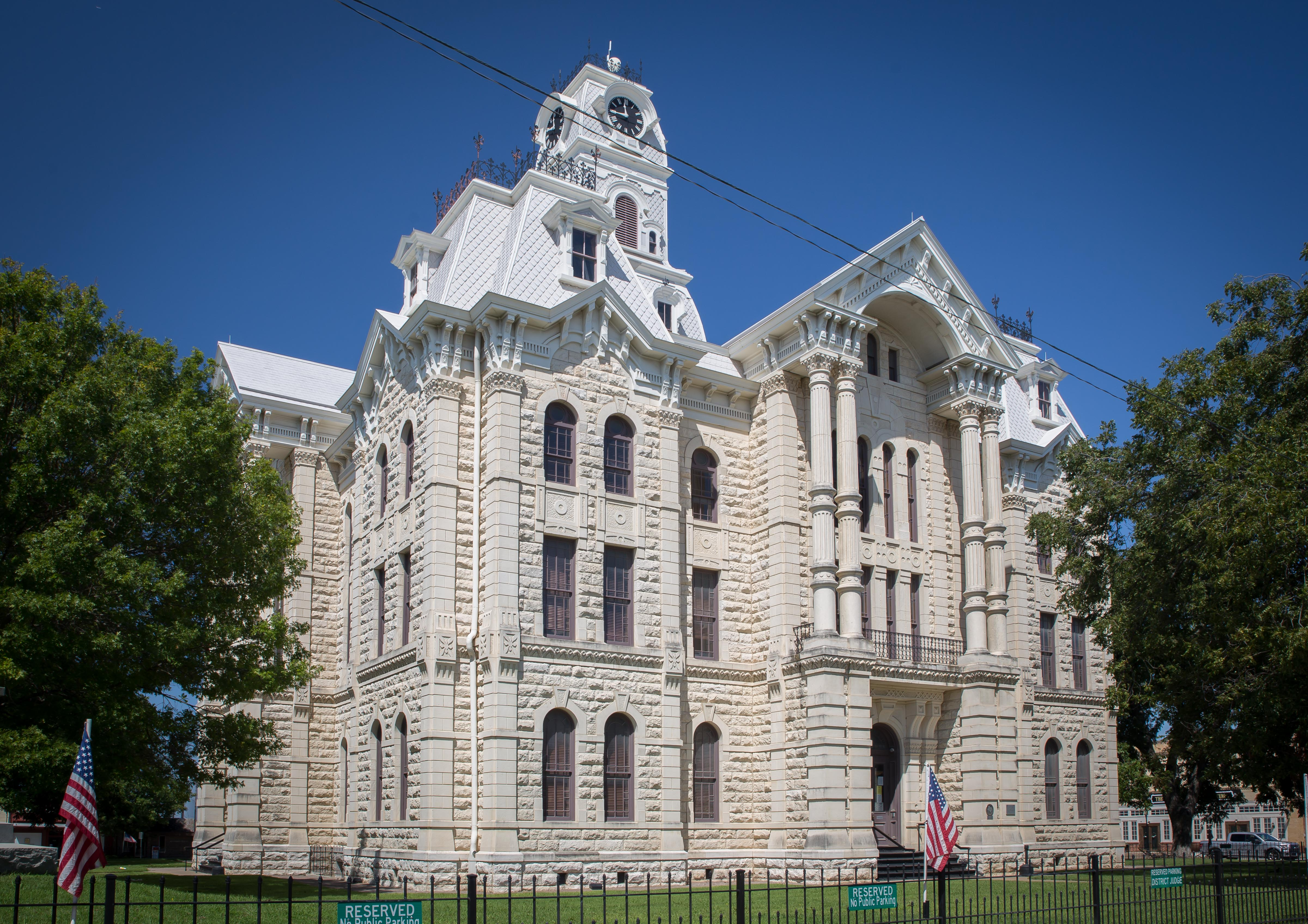
- Hill County Courthouse (2022)

- Location within Texas Location within the United States
- Interactive map showing the location of Hill County Courthouse
- Location: Courthouse Sq., Hillsboro, Texas
- Coordinates: 32°00′40″N 97°07′50″W
- Area: less than one acre
- Built: 1890
- Built by: Tom Lovell
- Architect: W.C. Dodson
- Architectural style: Second Empire
- NRHP reference No.: 71000939
- Added to NRHP: June 21, 1971

The Hill County Courthouse is a courthouse building in the town of Hillsboro, Hill County, Texas. It was listed on the National Register of Historic Places in 1971. The building was designed by architect W.C. Dodson using a Second Empire style. Tom Lovell served as the building contractor. It was completed in 1890.

The building was designated as a Recorded Texas Historic Landmark in 1964, and was listed on the National Register in 1971.

== Structure ==
The building is a limestone structure fronted by Corinthian columns and having mansard roofs, with three floors of courtrooms and a seven-story clock tower rising from the middle.

== 1993 electrical fire ==
On January 1, 1993, the courthouse was heavily damaged by an electrical fire. It was rebuilt, courtesy of donations from around the world and two concerts sponsored by Hill County native Willie Nelson. The courthouse won the Downtown Association's 1999 award for "Best Restoration".
