= Museum for East Texas Culture =

- Palestine High School
- U.S. National Register of Historic Places
- Recorded Texas Historic Landmark
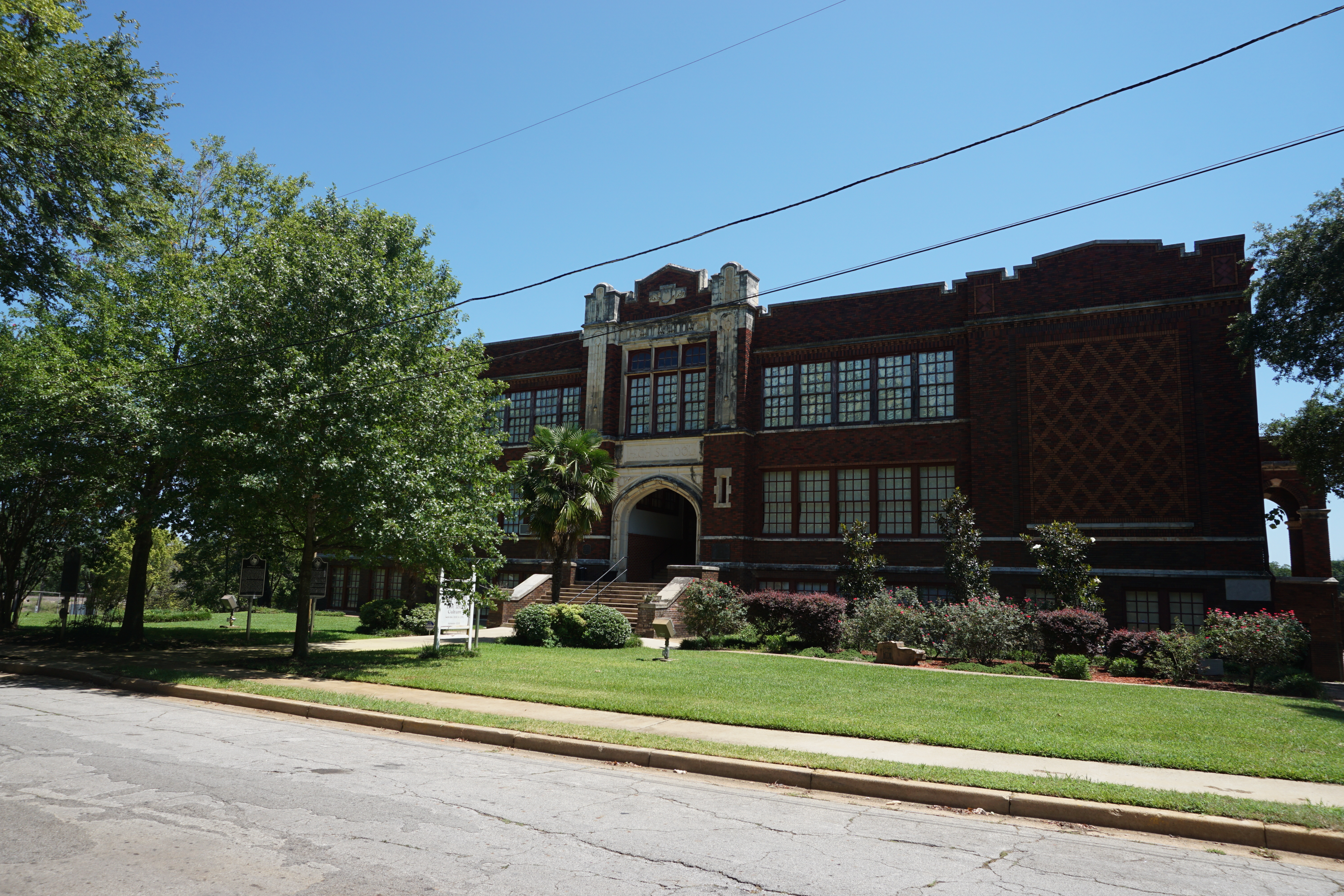
- Former Palestine High School in 2017

- Location within Texas Location within the United States
- Location: 400 Micheaux Ave., Palestine, Texas
- Coordinates: 31°45′29″N 95°37′38″W
- Area: 4 acres (1.6 ha)
- Built: 1915
- Built by: A.W. Flynt
- Architect: Sanguinet & Staats
- Architectural style: Tudor Revival, Jacobean-Tudor
- Website: Museum for East Texas Culture
- NRHP reference No.: 86002295
- RTHL No.: 8790

Significant dates
- Added to NRHP: September 24, 1986
- Designated RTHL: 1986

The Museum for East Texas Culture is a museum in Reagan Park in Palestine, Texas.

The building was built in 1915 as Palestine High School. It opened in 1916 and graduated its first class in 1917. In 1939 it became a junior high school, and was named the Reagan School, after John H. Reagan, in 1955. It became an elementary school in 1966 and closed in 1976. It opened as the current museum in 1982. It was added to the National Register of Historic Places as "Palestine High School" in 1986.

== See also ==
- National Register of Historic Places listings in Anderson County, Texas
- Recorded Texas Historic Landmarks in Anderson County
