= Copperas Cove Stagestop and Post Office =

- U.S. National Register of Historic Places
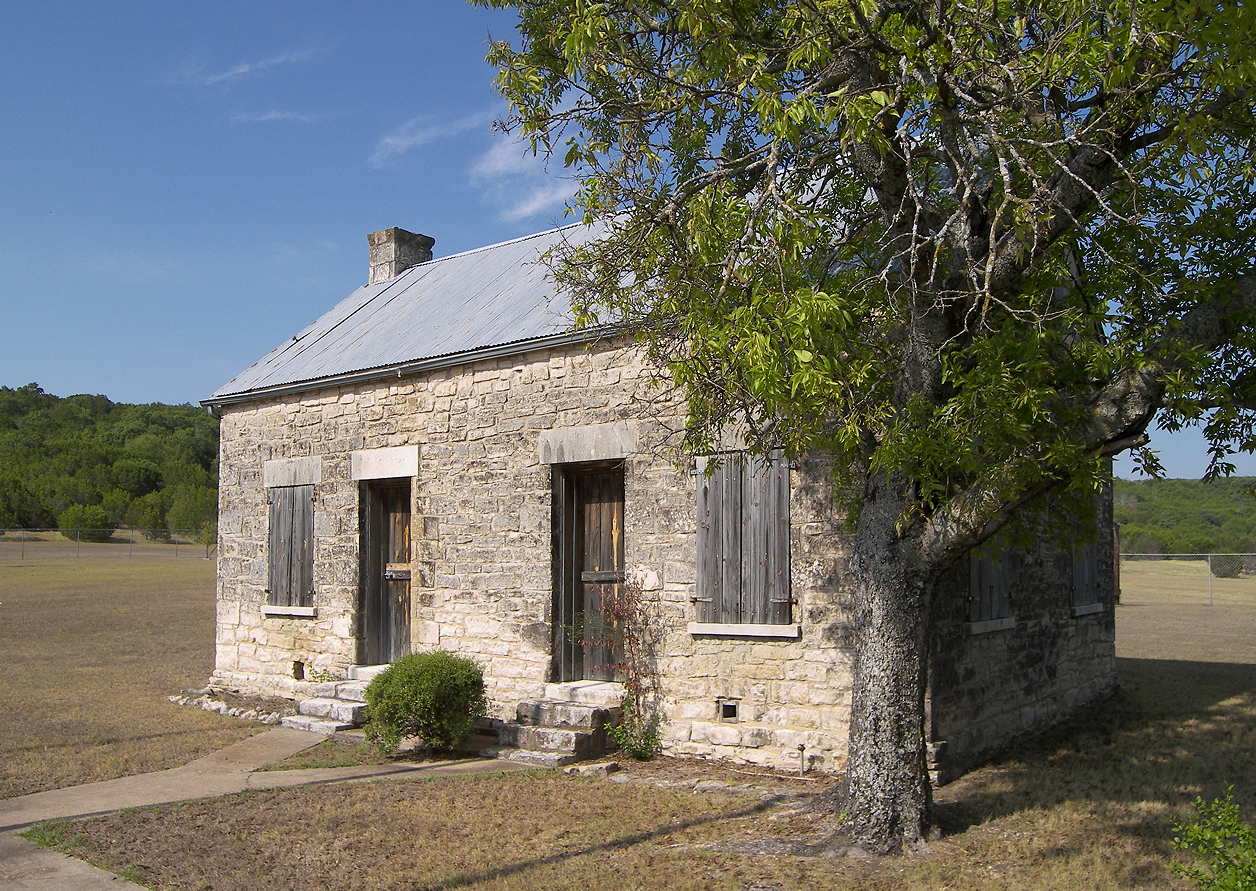
- Location: Off U.S. Route 190, 1.6 miles (2.6 km) southwest of Copperas Cove, Texas
- Coordinates: 31°06′15″N 97°55′44″W
- Area: 1.2 acres (0.49 ha)
- Built: 1878
- Built by: Ogletree, Marsden
- NRHP reference No.: 79002928
- Added to NRHP: September 26, 1979

The Copperas Cove Stagestop and Post Office, in Coryell County, Texas about 1.6 miles (2.6 km) southwest of Copperas Cove, Texas, was built in 1878. It was listed on the National Register of Historic Places in 1979. It has also served as the Martin I. Walker Historical Museum. The listing includes one contributing building and one contributing structure.

It was built of limestone quarried nearby.

It was deemed notable as "a fine example of the vernacular stone structures that dotted the nineteenth century Texas landscape. It is the only structure remaining from the original town of Copperas Cove, then known as The Cove. Having served numerous functions strategic to the locale, beginning with its original as stage relay station and post office and including home and grocery, it continues to be a major landmark in its present condition as a museum."

It is a Texas State Antiquities Landmark; known as Ogletree Stagestop and Post Office; built in 1878.
