= W.C. Dodson =

American architect

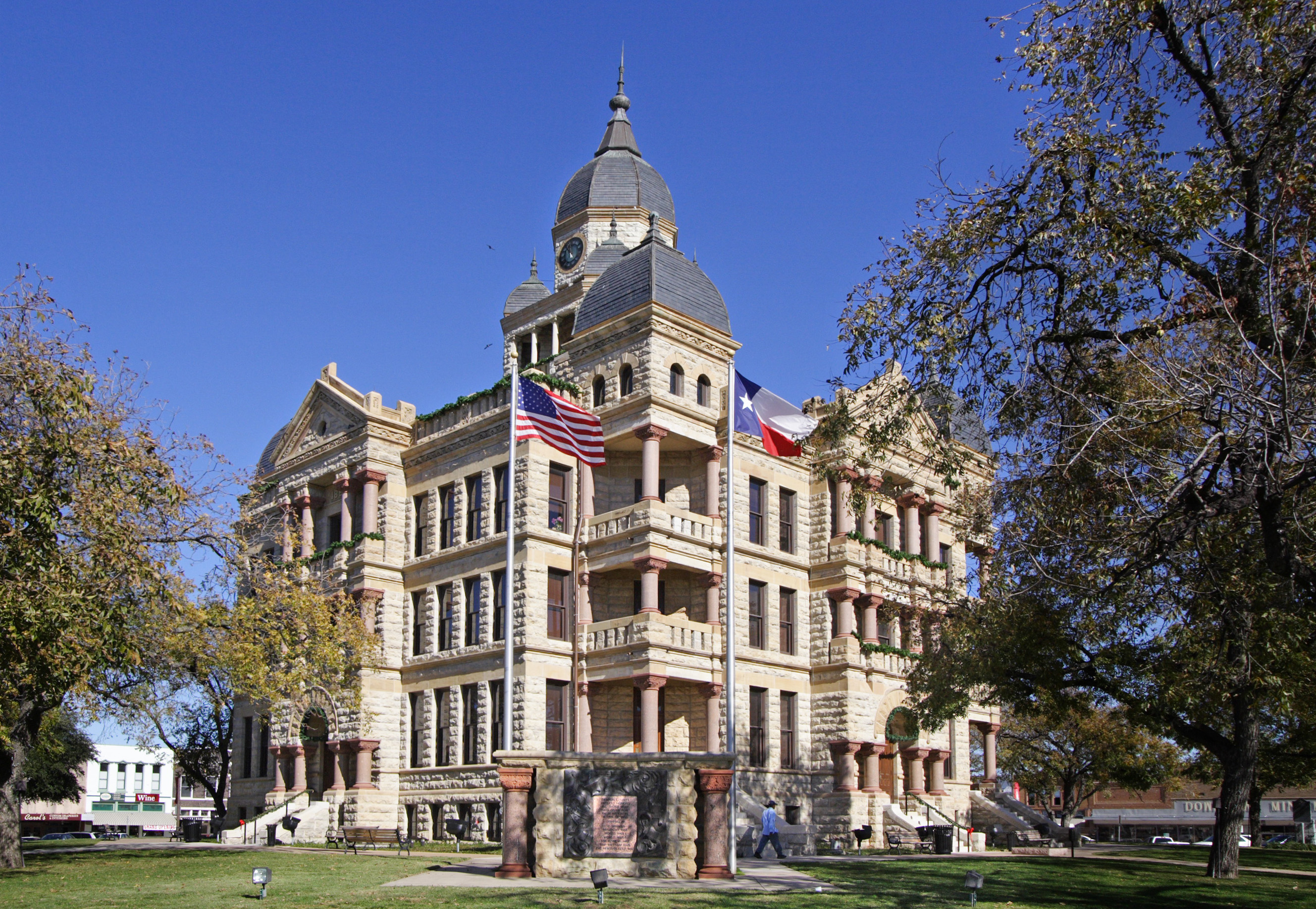
Denton County Courthouse-on-the-Square

Wesley Clark Dodson (1829–1914), most often known as W.C. Dodson, was an architect of Waco, Texas. Dodson fought for the Confederate States of America during the American Civil War. He traveled to Galveston, Texas from Alabama and later moved to Waco.

He worked in partnership Dodson & Dudley, also.

A number of his works are listed on the U.S. National Register of Historic Places.

Works by Dodson or the partnership include (with attribution):

- Coryell County Courthouse, Public Sq. Gatesville, TX (Dodson, W.C.), NRHP-listed
- Denton County Courthouse-on-the-Square, Public Sq., Denton, TX (Dodson, W.C.), NRHP-listed
- Fannin County Courthouse (Texas)
- First Presbyterian Church, 406 Avenue A Palestine, TX (Dodson & Dudley), NRHP-listed
- Hill County Courthouse, Courthouse Sq. Hillsboro, TX (Dodson, W.C.), NRHP-listed
- Hill County Jail, N. Waco St. Hillsboro, TX (Dodson, W.C.), NRHP-listed
- One or more works in Hood County Courthouse Historic District, Courthouse Sq., bounded by Bridge, Pearl, and Houston Sts. Granbury, TX (DODSON, W.C.), NRHP-listed
- Lampasas County Courthouse, Bounded by S. Live Oak, E. 4th, S. Pecan, and E. 3rd Sts. Lampasas, TX (Dodson, W.C.), NRHP-listed
- Lampasas Downtown Historic District, Roughly bounded by Second St., Pecan St., Fourth St. and Chestnut St. Lampasas, TX (Dodson, W.C.), NRHP-listed
- McLennan County, Texas, third Courthouse, Waco, TX, Second Empire, completed in 1857 and since demolished.
- Parker County Courthouse, Courthouse Sq. Weatherford, TX (Dodson, W.C.), NRHP-listed
