= Anderson Camp Ground =

- U.S. National Register of Historic Places
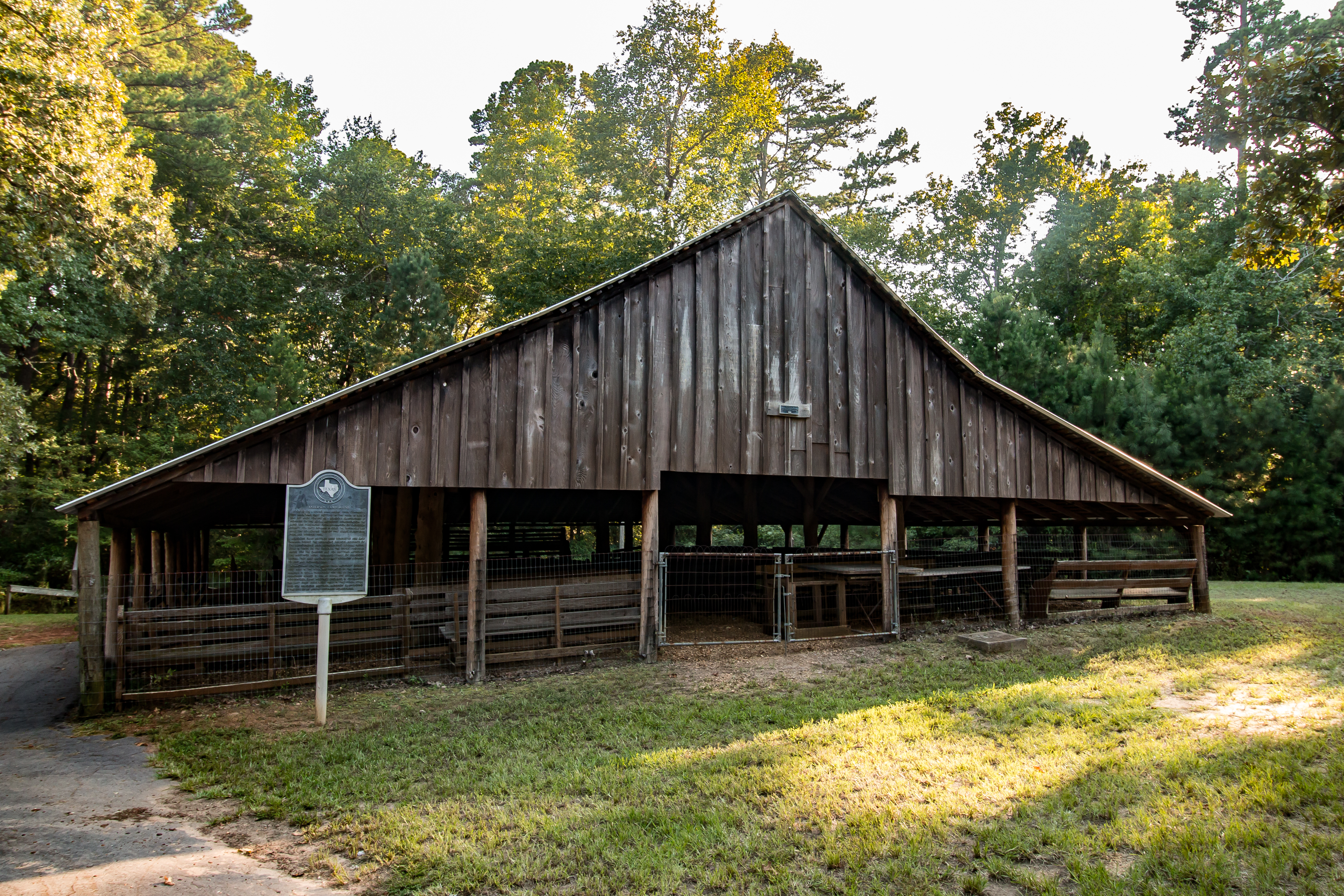
- Brushy Creek Arbor in 2016

- Location within Texas Location within the United States
- Nearest city: Brushy Creek, Williamson County, Texas
- Coordinates: 31°57′14″N 95°37′23″W
- Area: 5.6 acres (2.3 ha)
- Built: 1874
- Architectural style: Tabernacle, Gothic Revival
- NRHP reference No.: 82001735
- Added to NRHP: December 27, 1982

Anderson Camp Ground (also known as Brushy Creek Arbor and United Methodist Church) is a historic camp ground in Brushy Creek, in Anderson County, Texas, United States (not to be confused with Brushy Creek in Williamson County, near Austin).

The Arbor is a wooden tent-like structure that was built in 1874. The Brushy Creek Methodist Church is a one-story Gothic Revival structure that was built in 1894.

The site was added to the National Register of Historic Places in 1982.

The last Methodist camp meetings at the camp ground occurred in the 1930s.

== See also ==
- National Register of Historic Places listings in Anderson County, Texas
