= Eugene T. Heiner =

American architect

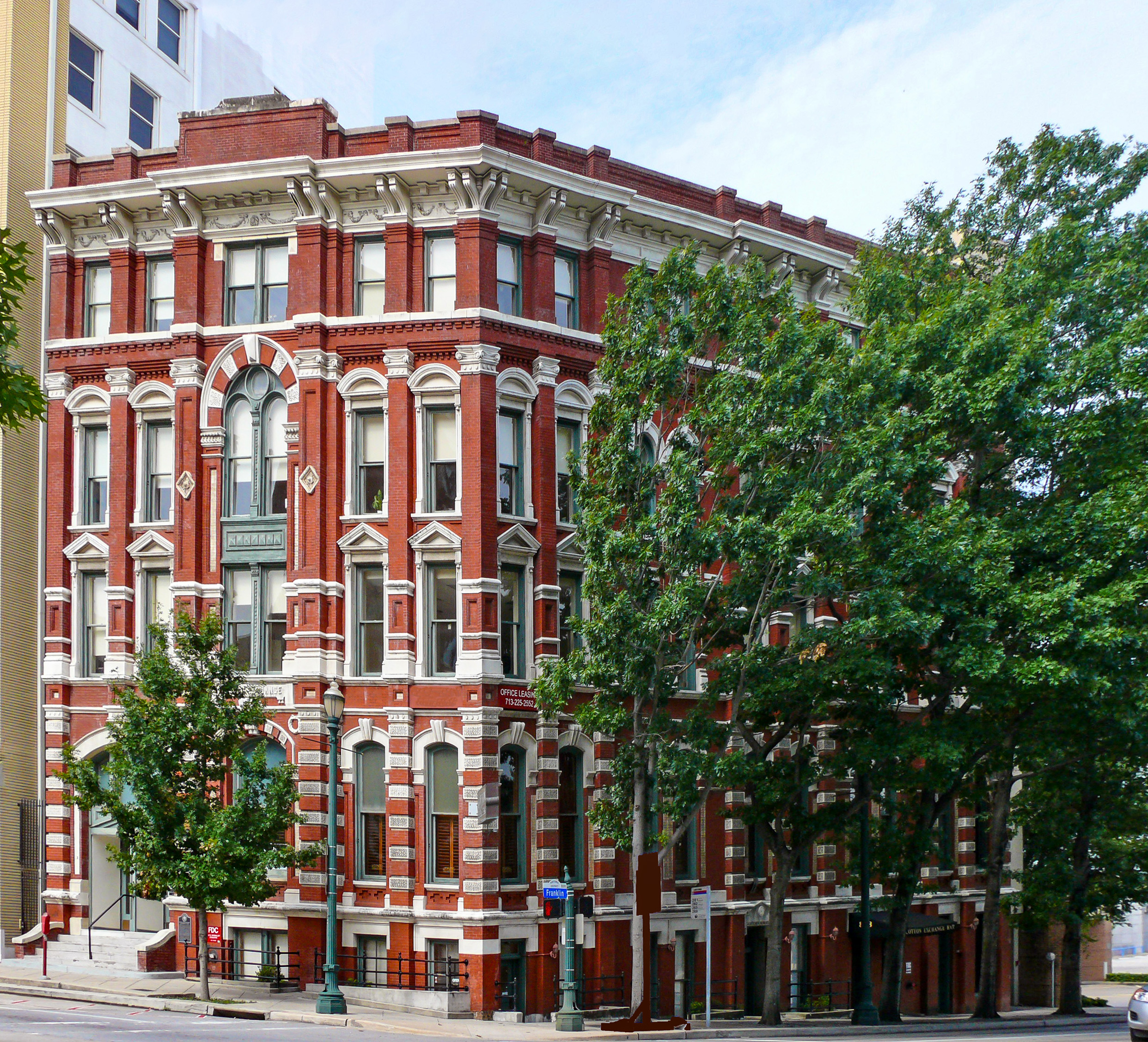
Houston Cotton Exchange

Eugene Thomas Heiner (August 20, 1852 – 1901) was an American architect who designed numerous courthouses, county jails, and other public buildings in Texas. He was born in New York City, apprenticed in Chicago, and studied further in Germany. His works includes buildings listed on the U.S. National Register of Historic Places.

== Early life ==
Eugene Heiner was born on August 20, 1852, in New York City. As a teenager, he studied under an architect in Chicago, before moving to Dallas in 1877. He moved to Texas the next year, where he practiced architecture for the rest of his career.

== Career ==
Among Heiner's first commissions in Houston was the 1880 Harris County Jail, located at the corner of Preston Avenue and Caroline Street. This building was crowned by a crested Mansard roof, equipped with ocular windows. This commission established his reputation, and was just the first of many courthouses and jails in Texas which defined his career. He won He also designed the Smith County Jail in 1881 and Gonzales County Jail. In addition to designing many Texas jails over the next two decades, he also designed courthouses in Texas. Three of these, the Colorado County Courthouse, Old Brazoria County Courthouse, and the Lavaca County Courthouse, are listed on the National Register of Historic Places. He is also credited with the design of a building at Texas A & M University in College Station, Texas, and one at the Texas State Penitentiary in Huntsville, Texas.

Heiner executed various commissions in Galveston and Houston. These included the Blum Building (Galveston), the Kaufman and Runge Building (Galveston), and his best known buildings in Houston: the Houston Cotton Exchange, the W. L. Foley Building, and the Sweeney and Coombs Opera House. The Houston Cotton Exchange Building, completed in 1884, still stands As of 2024 at 202 Travis at the corner of Franklin Avenue. The three-story red-brick building combines Victorian and Renaissance elements, but with cladding and ornaments set at varying depths. The main entrance on Travis Street is a high-vaulted-arch frame with double doors. The Cotton Exchange commissioned Heiner to add a fourth floor in 1907.

== Personal life ==
In 1878, Heiner married Viola Isenhour. The couple had four daughters.

== Death and legacy ==
Heiner died in Houston on April 26, 1901. He is buried at Glenwood Cemetery in Houston. A marker by the Texas State Historical Commission commemorates his work.

== Works ==
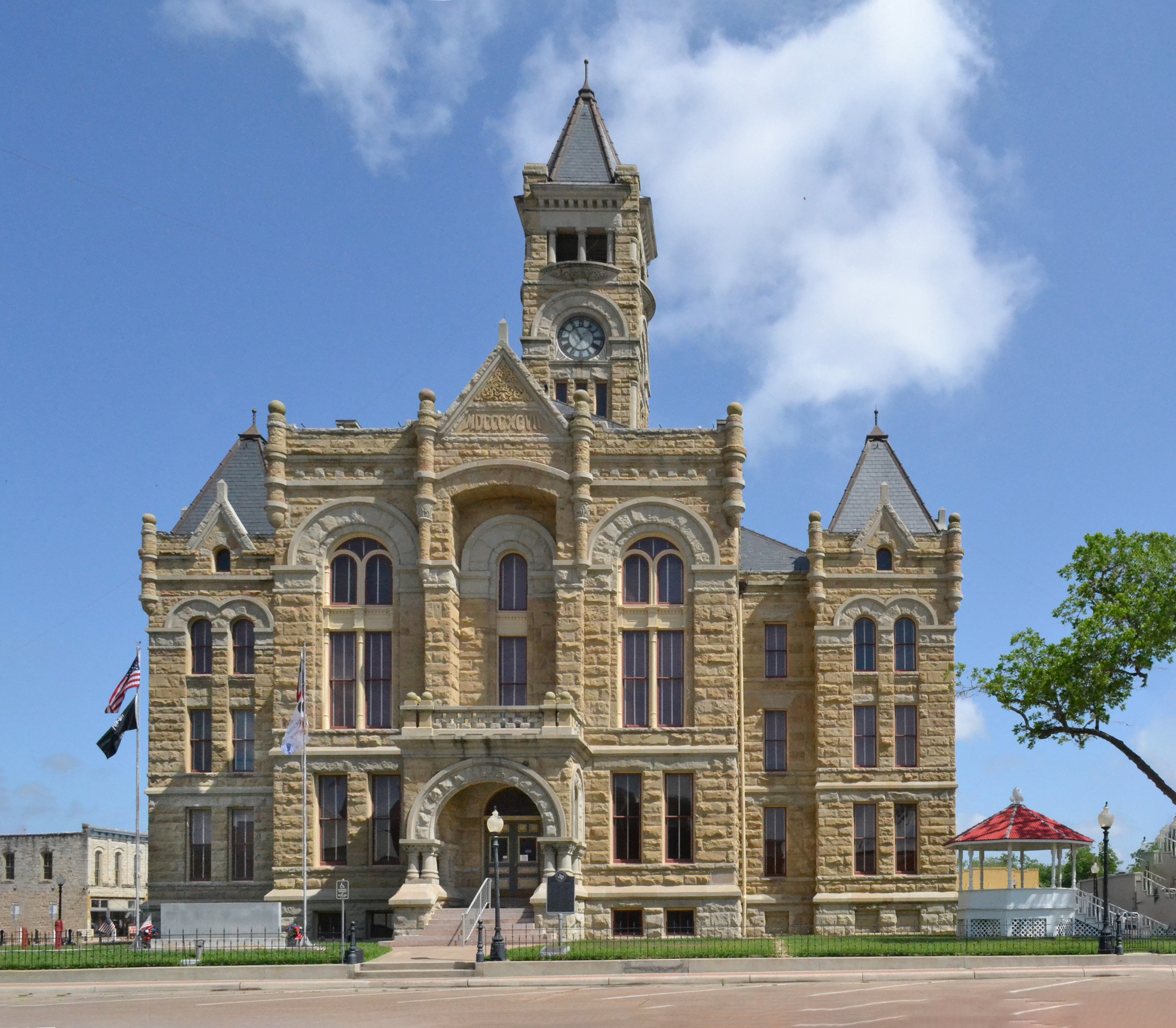
Lavaca County Courthouse

Works include:

- A. E. Kiesling Drug Store, Main Street, Houston (1875, cloaked under a slipcover)
- Leon & H. Blum Building (1879), now Tremont House (Galveston, Texas), 2300 Mechanic Street, Galveston, Texas
- Harris County Jail, Preston Avenue at Caroline Street, Houston (1880, demolished)
- Sweeney and Coombs Building (1880), 310 Main Street, Market Square Historic District, Houston
- Smith County Jail, 1881, 309 Erwin St. Tyler, TX (Heiner, Eugene), NRHP-listed
- Kauffman & Runge Building (1882), now Stewart Title Building (Galveston, Texas), 220 22nd Street, Galveston, Texas
- Charles S. House house (1882), 1806 Main Street, Houston, demolished.
- Henry Brashear Building (1882), Market Square Historic District, Houston
- Galveston County Courthouse (refacing of 1857 building in 1882, destroyed in fire, 1896)
- Eugene T. Heiner house, Houston (c. 1882).
- George L. Porter house, Houston (c. 1882).
- Dr. James H. Blake house, 1517 Texas Avenue at Crawford, Houston (1884).
- Houston Cotton Exchange Building (1884), 202 Travis St. Houston, TX (Heiner, Eugene), NRHP-listed
- Falls County Courthouse, Marlin, Texas (1888)
- Runnels County Courthouse, Ballinger, Texas, (1888–1889) followed by significant alterations.
- Wharton County Courthouse, corner of Milam and Houston streets, Wharton, Texas (1889, remodeled)
- Jasper County Courthouse (1889), Public Sq. Jasper, TX (Heiner, Eugene T.), NRHP-listed
- T. W. House Bank, Main Street, Houston (1889, demolished)
- W. L. Foley Building (1889 reconstruction), 214—218 Travis St. Houston, TX (Heiner, Eugene T.), NRHP-listed

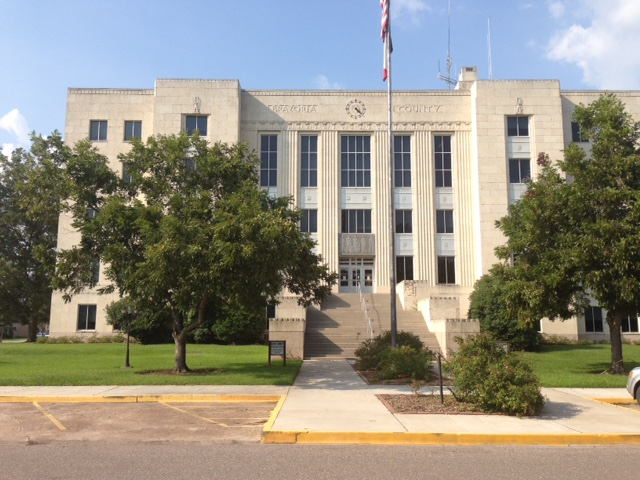
Old Brazoria County Courthouse

- Colorado County Courthouse (1890), Bounded by Milam, Spring, Travis and Walnut Sts. Columbus, TX (Heiner, Eugene T.), NRHP-listed
- T. H. Scanlan House, 1917 Main Street, Houston (1891).
- Brazos County Courthouse, Bryan, Texas (c. 1892).
- Jefferson County, TX Courthouse, Beaumont, Texas, (1893, demolished).
- Old Brazoria County Courthouse (1894), Public Sq. Angleton, TX (Heiner, Eugene T.), NRHP-listed
- Sweeney & Coombs Opera House, Houston (1894, demolished)
- Harris County Jail, Houston (1894, demolished)
- Houston High School, Houston (1894, demolished)
- Lavaca County Courthouse (1897), bounded by LaGrange, 2nd, 3rd, and Main Sts. Hallettsville, TX (Heiner, T.), NRHP-listed
- Wiley J. Croom House, 205 E. Milam Wharton, TX (Heiner, Eugene), NRHP-listed

DeWitt County Courthouse

- De Witt County Courthouse, bounded by N. Gonzales, E. Live Oak, N. Clinton, and E. Courthouse Sts. Cuero, TX (Heiner, Eugene), NRHP-listed
- Gonzales County Jail, Courthouse Sq. on St. Lawrence St. Gonzales, TX (Heiner, Eugene T.), NRHP-listed
- One or more works in Gonzales Commercial Historic District, roughly bounded by Water, Saint Andrew, Saint Peter, and Saint Matthew Sts. Gonzales, TX (Heiner, Eugene T., et al.), NRHP-listed

== Bibliography ==
- Beasley, Ellen; Fox, Stephen. Galveston Architecture Guidebook. Houston: Rice University Press. ISBN 0-89263-346-8.
- Bradley, Barrie Scardino (2020). Improbable Metropolis: Houston's Architectural and Urban History. Austin: University of Texas Press. ISBN 978-1-4773-2019-8.
- Houghton, Dorothy Knox Howe; Bradley, Barrie Scardino; Howe, Katherine S.; Blackburn, Sadie Gwin (1998). Houston’s Forgotten Heritage: Landscapes, Houses, Interiors, 1824–1914. College Station, TX: Texas A&M University. ISBN 978-1-62349-246-5.
- Kelsey, Mavis P, Sr.; Dyal, Donald H. (1993). The Courthouses of Texas. College Station, TX: Texas A&M University Press. ISBN 0-89096-546-3.
- Robinson, Willard B. (1981). Gone from Texas: Our Lost Architectural Heritage. College Station, TX: Texas A&M University Press. ISBN 0-89096-106-9.
