= List of county courthouses in Texas =

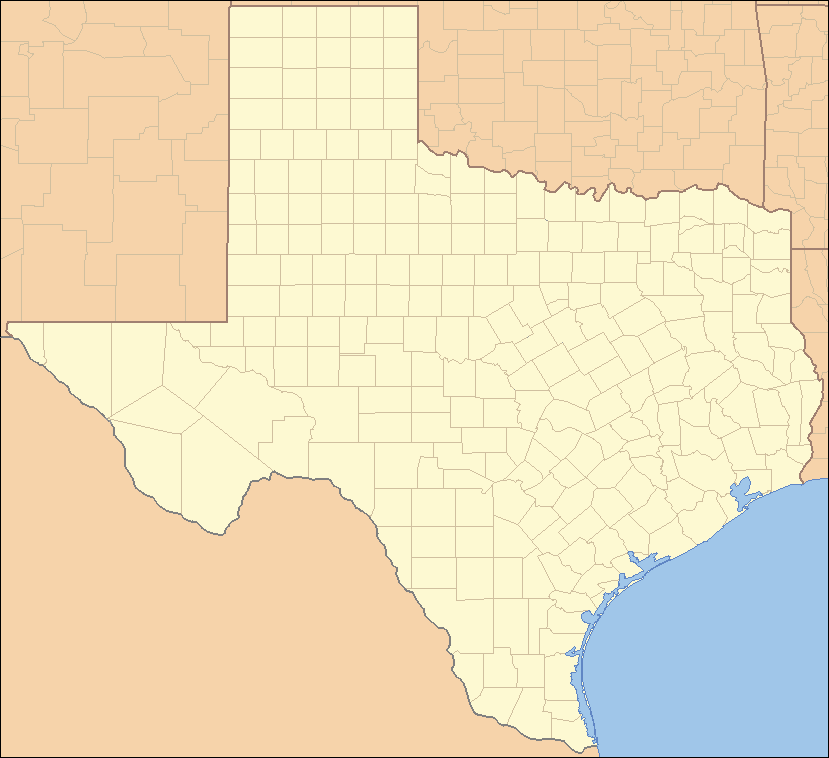
The 254 counties of Texas

This is a list of county courthouses and other non-federal courthouses in Texas, both current and former. For federal courthouses located in Texas, see List of United States federal courthouses in Texas.

The U.S. state of Texas has 254 counties, the most of any U.S. state. County borders and sizes were essentially set so that a courthouse would be within one day's travel, which, given slow transportation, meant many counties. The county courthouse system in the Republic of Texas was developed in 1845, which were designed to house government offices, a courtroom, and a jail. After statehood, Texas county courthouses kept their powers.

The counties of Texas were often first served by a tree, tent, or other buildings before judicial functions moved into a log cabin or dugout. During the later 19th century, most county courthouses were simple wooden or stone two-story rectangular buildings. Due to difficulties during the Civil War and Reconstruction, no new courthouses were built until the late 19th century, when a large number were constructed. Architect James Riely Gordon built 18 county courthouses, 12 of which survive; Wyatt C. Hedrick built 7. Other architects from this time period included Atlee Ayres, Nicholas J. Clayton, W.C. Dodson, Alfred Giles, Eugene T. Heiner, and Frederick and Oscar Ruffini.

Another wave of courthouse buildings occurred during the early 20th century, as the statewide economy boomed and transportation infrastructure expanded. Architects of this period included David S. Castle, Lang & Witchell, and Charles Henry Page. Courthouses were also common Works Progress Administration (WPA) projects during the Great Depression. During this time, numerous courthouses were expanded and remodeled.

Texas courthouses often reflect the architectural styles that were popular at the time they were built. Many of the surviving Late Victorian Era courthouses have Romanesque Revival, Renaissance Revival, Neoclassical, and Second Empire features. While some of these styles persisted into the 20th century, newly-developed styles, such as Beaux-Arts and Mission Revival, began to be incorporated. During the WPA's projects, many courthouses were replaced or remodeled with Moderne, Stripped Classicist, International, and Art Deco elements. Finally, the most recent courthouses and expansions are designed in the Modern and Brutalist styles.

Government buildings were often constructed around a central plaza or public square, which became a center of town life and economy, and this layout has persisted. Several of the squares include statues, war memorials, and historic trees on the grounds; many also function as markets.

Many original structures have been lost to fire, including those in Austin, Hill, Mason, and Newton counties. Arson has been suspected or confirmed in some cases. The oldest continuous site still inhabited by a county courthouse is in Liberty County, where its courthouse has stood—although rebuilt—since 1831.

In 1971 and 1972, two Texas Courthouse Acts were passed, which require the county to notify the Texas Historical Commission (THC) of any plans to remodel or destroy historic courthouses. The THC's Courthouse Preservation Program funds restoration works on historic courthouse buildings.

== List ==
Key

Listed individually on the National Register of Historic Places
Listed on the National Register of Historic Places as part of a Historic District
Recorded Texas Historic Landmark

Courthouse	Image	Location	Years	Notes
Anderson County Courthouse		Palestine, Anderson County	1914 built 1988 RTHL; 1992 NRHP	Designed in the Beaux-Arts style by Page Brothers and remodeled in the 1980s.
Andrews County Courthouse		Andrews, Andrews County	1939 built	Designed in the Moderne style by W. T. Strange.
Angelina County Courthouse		Lufkin, Angelina County	1955 built	Designed in the Modern style by Wilber Kent.
Aransas County Courthouse		Rockport, Aransas County	1956 built	Designed by Lynn A. Evans in the Modern style. An extension to the building was constructed in 1983. The building was heavily damaged by Hurricane Harvey and was subsequently demolished.
Archer County Courthouse		Archer City, Archer County	1891 built 1963 RTHL; 1977 NRHP; 2002 restored	Designed in the Romanesque Revival style by Alonzo Dawson. The building was extensively renovated in 1926.
Armstrong County Courthouse		Claude, Armstrong County	1912 built	Designed in the Neoclassical style by Elmer George Withers.
Atascosa County Courthouse		Jourdanton, Atascosa County	1912 built 1977 NRHP; 2003 restored	Designed in the Mission Revival style by Henry T. Phelps.
Austin County Courthouse		Bellville, Austin County	1960 built	Designed in the Modern style by Wyatt C. Hendrick.
Bailey County Courthouse		Muleshoe, Bailey County	1925 built	Designed by M. C. Butler in the Neoclassical style.
Bandera County Courthouse		Bandera, Bandera County	1891 built 1972 RTHL; 1979 NRHP; 2007 restored	Designed in the Renaissance Revival style by B.F. Trester, though he may have purchased its plan from a pair of architects in Kentucky.
Bastrop County Courthouse		Bastrop, Bastrop County	1883 built 1964 RTHL; 1975 NRHP	Designed in the Renaissance Revival style by Jasper N. Preston and Frederick Ernst Ruffini, but extensively modified in 1923, 1953, and 1989.
Baylor County Courthouse		Seymour, Baylor County	1968 built	Designed in the Modern style by Pierce, Norris, and Pace.
Bee County Courthouse		Beeville, Bee County	1912 built 2000 RTHL; 2001 NRHP; 2006 restored	Designed in the Beaux Arts style by Stephenson and Heldenfels.
Bell County Courthouse		Belton, Bell County	1884 built 1976 NRHP; 20002 RTHL	Designed in the Renaissance Revival style by Jasper N. Preston and Son.
Bexar County Courthouse		San Antonio, Bexar County	1896 built 1975 NRHP; 1976 RTHL; 2015 restored.	Designed in the Richardsonian Romanesque style by James Riely Gordon and modified several times between 1914 and 1972.
Old Blanco County Courthouse		Blanco, Blanco County	1885 built 1972 RTHL; 1991 NRHP	Designed by Frederick Ernst Ruffini in the Second Empire style.
Blanco County Courthouse		Johnson City, Blanco County	1916 built 1983 RTHL	Designed in the Neoclassical style by Henry T. Phelps.
Borden County Courthouse		Gail, Borden County	1939 built	Designed in the Moderne style by David S. Castle.
Bosque County Courthouse		Meridian, Bosque County	1886 built 1965 RTHL; 1977 NRHP; 2005–07 restored	Designed in the Romanesque Revival style by J. J. Kane, but remodeling and renovations in 1934 and the 1970s transformed the building into a Moderne style structure.
Bowie County Courthouse		New Boston, Bowie County	1985 built	Designed in the Modern style by Thomas and Embeton Associates.
Old Brazoria County Courthouse		Angleton, Brazoria County	1897 built 1979 NRHP; 1983 RTHL	Designed in the Italianate style by Eugene T. Heiner.
Brazoria County Courthouse		Angleton, Brazoria County	1940, 1976 built	The 1940 building was designed in the Moderne style by Lamar Q. Cato and was expanded in 1976 with another courthouse building designed by Wyatt C. Hedrick in the Modern style.
Brazos County Courthouse		Bryan, Brazos County	1955 built	Designed in the Modern style by Caudill, Rowlett, and Scott and modified in 1986 and 1991.
Brewster County Courthouse		Alpine, Brewster County	1887 built 1965 RTHL; 1978 NRHP	Designed in the Second Empire style by Tom Lovell.
Briscoe County Courthouse		Silverton, Briscoe County	1922 built	Designed in the Neoclassical style by Smith and Townes.
Brooks County Courthouse		Falfurrias, Brooks County	1914 built 1977 RTHL; 2010 restored 2012 NRHP	Designed by Alfred Giles in the Neoclassical style.
Brown County Courthouse		Brownwood, Brown County	1917 built	This courthouse was the result of a total remodeling of the third courthouse, built in 1884 to a Neoclassical design by Henry T. Phelps.
Burleson County Courthouse		Caldwell, Burleson County	1927 built	Designed in the Neoclassical style by J. M. Glover.
Burnet County Courthouse		Burnet, Burnet County	1936 built 2000 NRHP; 2011 restored	Designed in the Moderne style by Willis Environmental Engineering.
Caldwell County Courthouse		Lockhart, Caldwell County	1894 built 1976 RTHL; 1978 NRHP	Designed in the Second Empire style by Alfred Giles.
Calhoun County Courthouse		Port Lavaca, Calhoun County	1959 built	Designed in the Modern style by Rusty and Martin.
Callahan County Courthouse		Baird, Callahan County	1929 built 2003 RTHL	Designed in the Renaissance Revival style by Voelcker and Dixon.
Cameron County Courthouse (1882)		Brownsville, Cameron County	1882 built 1962 RTHL	
Cameron County Courthouse (1914)		Brownsville, Cameron County	1912 built 1962 RTHL; 1980 NRHP; 1995–2000, 2006 restored	Designed in the Renaissance Revival style by Atlee Ayres.
Cameron County Courthouse (1978)		Brownsville, Cameron County	1978 built	
Camp County Courthouse		Pittsburg, Camp County	1928 built 2004 RTHL; 2013 NRHP	Designed in the Neoclassical style by Smith and Praeger.
Carson County Courthouse		Panhandle, Carson County	1950 built	Designed in the Moderne style by J. C. Berry.
Cass County Courthouse		Linden, Cass County	1861 built 1967 RTHL; 1979 NRHP; 2012 restored	Designed by Charles Ames in the Neoclassical style.
Castro County Courthouse		Dimmitt, Castro County	1940 built	Designed by Townes and Funk in the Moderne style.
Chambers County Courthouse		Anahuac, Chambers County	1936 built 2008 NRHP	Designed in the Moderne style by Cornell G. Curtis.
Cherokee County Courthouse		Rusk, Cherokee County	1941 built 1961 RTHL	Designed in the Moderne style by Gill and Bennett.
Childress County Courthouse		Childress, Childress County	1939 built	Designed by Townes and Funk in the Moderne style.
Clay County Courthouse		Henrietta, Clay County	1884 built 1962 RTHL; 1978 NRHP	Designed in the Italianate style by Wilson and Tozer.
Cochran County Courthouse		Morton, Cochran County	1926, 1968 built	Designed in the Moderne style by W.R. Kaufman but expanded and remodeled in the Modern style in 1968.
Coke County Courthouse		Robert Lee, Coke County	1956 built	Designed in the Modern style by Wyatt C. Hedrick and Harry Weaver.
Coleman County Courthouse		Coleman, Coleman County	1884, 1952 built	Designed in 1884 by W. W. Dudley but remodeled in the Modern style by Wyatt C. Hedrick.
Old Collin County Courthouse		McKinney	1874, 1927; 1998 RTHL	Designed in the Second Empire style by Charles Wheelock and renovated by W. A. Peters.
Collin County Courthouse (1979)		McKinney, Collin County	1979 built	Designed in the Modern style.
Collin County Courthouse		McKinney, Collin County	2008 built	
Collingsworth County Courthouse		Wellington, Collingsworth County	1931 built	Designed in the Neoclassical style by Bery and Hatch.
Colorado County Courthouse		Columbus, Colorado County	1891 built 1969 RTHL; 1976 NRHP; 2014 restored	Designed in the Renaissance Revival style by Eugene T. Heiner.
Comal County Courthouse		New Braunfels, Comal County	1898 built 1976 NRHP; 1993 RTHL; 2013 restored	Designed in the Romanesque Revival style by James Riely Gordon.
First Comanche County Courthouse		Comanche, Comanche County	1856 built	Designated a Recorded Texas Historic Landmark in 1965.
Comanche County Courthouse		Comanche, Comanche County	1939 built	Designed by Wyatt C. Hedrick in the Moderne style.
Concho County Courthouse		Paint Rock, Concho County	1883 built 1962 RTHL; 1977 NRHP	Designed by Frederick Ernst Ruffini in the Second Empire style.
Cooke County Courthouse		Gainesville, Cooke County	1911 built 1988 RTHL; 1991 NRHP; 2011 restored	Designed in the Beaux Arts style by Land and Witchell.
Coryell County Courthouse		Gatesville, Coryell County	1897 built 1977 NRHP	Designed in an eclectic style by W. C. Dodson.
Cottle County Courthouse		Paducah, Cottle County	1930 built 2004 NRHP; 2005 RTHL	Designed by Voelcker and Dixon in the Moderne style.
Crane County Courthouse		Crane, Crane County	1948, 1958 built	Built in 1948 but remodeled in 1958 to a Modern style design by Groos, Clift, and Ball.
Crockett County Courthouse		Ozona, Crockett County	1902 built 1966 RTHL; 1974 NRHP	Designed by Oscar Ruffini in the Second Empire style.
Crosby County Courthouse		Crosbyton, Crosby Count	1914 built 2000 NRHP	Designed in the Neoclassical style by Marion Lee Waller.
Culberson County Courthouse		Van Horn, Culberson County	1964 built 1962 RTHL	Designed by Pierce, Norris, Pace, and Associates in the Modern style.
Dallam County Courthouse		Dalhart, Dallam County	1922 built 1991 RTHL; 1992 NRHP	Designed in the Neoclassical style by Smith and Townes.
Old Dallas County Courthouse		Dallas, Dallas County	1892 built 1976 NRHP; 1977 RTHL; 2001–07 restored	Designed by Orlopp and Kusener in the Richardsonian Romanesque style.
Dallas County Courthouse		Dallas, Dallas County	1966 built	Designed in the Modern style.
Dawson County Courthouse		Lamesa, Dawson County	1916, 1952 built	Designed in the Neoclassical style by Sanguinet and Staats, but remodeled and expanded in the Modern style by Allen and Allen in 1952.
Deaf Smith County Courthouse		Hereford, Deaf Smith County	1910 built 1965 RTHL	Designed in the Neoclassical style by Chamberlin and Company.
Delta County Courthouse		Cooper, Delta County	1940 built	Designed in the Moderne style by Hook Smith.
Denton County Courthouse-on-the-Square		Denton, Denton County	1896 built 1970 RTHL; 1977 NRHP; 2004 restored	Designed by Wesley Clark Dodson in an eclectic style.
Denton County Courthouse		Denton, Denton County	1998 built	
DeWitt County Courthouse		Cuero, DeWitt County	1897 built 1966 RTHL; 1971 NRHP; 2007 restored	Designed in the Romanesque Revival style by A. O. Watson.
Dickens County Courthouse		Dickens, Dickens County	1893 built 1962 RTHL; 1980 NRHP	Originally designed in the Richardsonian Romanesque style, but since remodeled.
Dimmit County Courthouse		Carrizo Springs, Dimmit County	1884, 1927 built 1984 NRHP; 2000 RTHL; 2004 restored	Originally an Italianate structure designed by J. G. Breeding, but remodeled into a Neoclassical structure
Donley County Courthouse		Clarendon, Donley County	1894 built 1978 NRHP; 2006 RTHL; 2003 restored	Designed in the Romanesque Revival style by Bulger and Rapp.
Duval County Courthouse		San Diego, Duval County	1916 built	Designed in the Neoclassical style by Staats and Gottlieb.
Eastland County Courthouse		Eastland, Eastland County	1928 built 2007 RTHL	Designed in an eclectic style by Lang and Witchell.
Ector County Courthouse		Odessa, Ector County	1938, 1964 built	The 1938 courthouse was designed by Elmer Withers and then surrounded in 1964 with a Modern structure designed by Peters and Fields.
Edwards County Courthouse		Rocksprings, Edwards County	1891 built 1973 RTHL; 1979 NRHP; 2014 restored	Designed in the Romanesque Revival style by Ben Davey and Bruno Schott.
Ellis County Courthouse		Waxahachie, Ellis County	1896 built 1969 RTHL; 1975 NRHP; 2002 restored	Designed by James Riely Gordon in the Richardsonian Romanesque style.
El Paso County Courthouse		El Paso, El Paso County	1991 built	Designed in the Postmodern style.
Erath County Courthouse		Stephenville, Erath County	1892 built 1963 RTHL; 1977 NRHP; 2002 restored	Designed by James Riely Gordon in the Richardsonian Romanesque style.
Falls County Courthouse		Marlin, Falls County	1939 built 2000 RTHL; 2000 NRHP	Designed in the Moderne style by Arthur E. Thomas.
Fannin County Courthouse		Bonham, Fannin County	1889, 1965 built	Built in the Second Empire style by W. C. Dodson in 1889 but remodeled in 1965 in the Modern style by Buford Architects and Engineers.
Fayette County Courthouse		La Grange, Fayette County	1891 built 1975 NRHP; 2001 RTHL; 2003–05 restored	Designed by James Riely Gordon in the Richardsonian Romanesque style.
Fisher County Courthouse		Roby, Fisher County	1972 built	Designed in the Modern style by Lovett and Sellar and Associates.
Floyd County Courthouse		Floydada, Floyd County	1950 built	Designed in the Modern style by Marvin Styles.
Foard County Courthouse		Crowell, Foard County	1910 built 2001 RTHL	Designed by Elmer George Withers in the Neoclassical style.
Fort Bend County Courthouse		Richmond, Fort Bend County	1908 built 1980 RTHL; 1980 NRHP	Designed by C. H. Page in the Beaux-Arts style.
Franklin County Courthouse		Mount Vernon, Franklin County	1912 built 2006 NRHP; 2009–14 restored	Designed by L. L. Thurman and Company in the Neoclassical style.
Freestone County Courthouse		Fairfield, Freestone County	1919 built	Designed in the Neoclassical style by W. R. Kaufman.
Frio County Courthouse		Pearsall, Frio County	1904 built	Designed in the Romanesque Revival style by Henry T. Phelps. It had a third floor that was removed in 1938.
Gaines County Courthouse		Seminole, Gaines County	1922, 1955 built	Designed in the Modern style by Sanguinet and Staats and renovated in 1955 by Styles, Robert, Gee, and Messersmith.
Galveston County Civil Courthouse		Galveston, Galveston County	1966 built	Designed in the Modern style by Raymond R. Rapp, Jr. and Ben J. Koten and Associates.
Galveston County Justice Center		Galveston, Galveston County	2006 built	
Garza County Courthouse		Post, Garza County	1923 built 2000 RTHL; 2001 NRHP	Designed in the Neoclassical style by Guy A. Carlander.
Old Gillespie County Courthouse		Fredericksburg, Gillespie County	1882 built 1967 RTHL; 1967 restored 1971 NRHP	Designed in the Italianate style by Alfred Giles.
Gillespie County Courthouse		Fredericksburg, Gillespie County	1939 built	Designed in the Moderne style by Edward Stein.
Glasscock County Courthouse		Garden City, Glasscock County	1909 built 1993 RTHL; 2011 NRHP	Designed in the Neoclassical style by Edward Columbus Hosford and Company.
Goliad County Courthouse		Goliad, Goliad County	1894 built 1964 RTHL; 1976 NRHP; 2004 restored	Designed in the Second Empire style by E. M. Guidon. Altered after significant storm damage in 1942.
Gonzales County Courthouse		Gonzales, Gonzales County	1894 built 1966 RTHL; 1972 NRHP	Designed in Richardsonian Romanesque style by James Riely Gordon.
Gray County Courthouse		Pampa, Gray County	1928 built 1997 RTHL; 1998 NRHP; 2003 restored	Designed in the Neoclassical style by W. R. Kaufman.
Grayson County Courthouse		Sherman, Grayson County	1936 built	Designed in the Moderne style by Voelcker and Dixon.
Gregg County Courthouse		Longview, Gregg County	1932 built	Designed in the Art Deco style by Voelcker and Dixon.
Grimes County Courthouse		Anderson, Grimes County	1893 built 1965 RTHL; 1974 NRHP; 2002 restored	Designed in the Italianate Revival style by F. S. Glover.
Guadalupe County Courthouse		Seguin, Guadalupe County	1935 built1983 NRHP	Designed in the Moderne style by L. M. Wirtz.
Hale County Courthouse		Plainview, Hale County	1910 built 1982 NRHP	Designed in the Beaux-Arts style by H. A. Overbeck and Byrne and Johnson.
Hall County Courthouse		Memphis, Hall County	1923 built 2008 RTHL	
Hamilton County Courthouse		Hamilton, Hamilton County	1886 built 1967 RTHL	
Hansford County Courthouse		Spearman, Hansford County	1931 built	
Hardeman County Courthouse		Quanah, Hardeman County	1908 built 2001 RTHL	
Hardin County Courthouse		Kountze, Hardin County	1959 built	
Harris County Courthouse of 1910		Houston, Harris County	1910 built	
Harris County Civil Courthouse		Houston, Harris County		
Harris County Criminal Justice Center		Houston, Harris County		
Old Harrison County Courthouse		Marshall, Harrison County	1900 built 1965 RTHL	
Harrison County Courthouse		Marshall, Harrison County	1964 built	
Hartley County Courthouse		Channing, Hartley County	1906 built 1987 RTHL	
Haskell County Courthouse		Haskell, Haskell County	1892/1906 built	
Hays County Courthouse		San Marcos, Hays County	1908 built	
Hemphill County Courthouse		Canadian, Hemphill County	1909 built	
Henderson County Courthouse		Athens, Henderson County	1913 built 2003 RTHL	
Old Hidalgo Courthouse and Buildings		Hidalgo, Hidalgo County	1896 built 1964 RTHL	
Hidalgo County Courthouse		Edinburg, Hidalgo County	1954 built	
Hill County Courthouse		Hillsboro, Hill County	1890/1997 built 1964 RTHL	
Hockley County Courthouse		Levelland, Hockley County	1928 built	
Hood County Courthouse		Granbury, Hood County	1890 built 1970 RTHL	
Hopkins County Courthouse		Sulphur Springs, Hopkins County	1895 built 1975 RTHL	
Houston County Courthouse		Crockett, Houston County	1939 built 2000 RTHL	
Howard County Courthouse		Big Spring, Howard County	1953 built	
Hudspeth County Courthouse		Sierra Blanca, Hudspeth County	1920 built 1962 RTHL	
Hunt County Courthouse		Greenville, Hunt County	1929 built 1994 RTHL	
Hutchinson County Courthouse		Stinnett, Hutchinson County	1927 built 1995 RTHL	
Old Irion County Courthouse		Sherwood, Irion County	1901 built	
Irion County Courthouse		Mertzon, Irion County	1937 built	
Jack County Courthouse		Jacksboro, Jack County	1940 built	
Jackson County Courthouse		Edna, Jackson County	1954 built	
Jasper County Courthouse		Jasper, Jasper County	1889 built	
Jeff Davis County Courthouse		Fort Davis, Jeff Davis County	1911 built 2000 RTHL	
Jefferson County Courthouse		Beaumont, Jefferson County	1931 built	
Jim Hogg County Courthouse		Hebbronville, Jim Hogg County	1913 built	
Jim Wells County Courthouse		Alice, Jim Wells County	1912 built	
Johnson County Courthouse		Cleburne, Johnson County	1913 built 1999 RTHL	
Jones County Courthouse		Anson, Jones County County	1910 built 2000 RTHL	
Old Karnes County Courthouse		Helena, Karnes County	1873 built 1962 RTHL	
Karnes County Courthouse		Karnes City, Karnes County	1894 built	
Kaufman County Courthouse		Kaufman, Kaufman County	1956 built	
Kendall County Courthouse		Boerne, Kendall County	1870 built 1970 RTHL	
Kendall County Courthouse		Boerne, Kendall County	1998 built	
Kenedy County Courthouse		Sarita, Kenedy County	1917 built	
Old Kent County Courthouse		Clairemont, Kent County	1893 built	
Kent County Courthouse		Jayton, Kent County	1957 built	
Kerr County Courthouse		Kerrville, Kerr County	1926 built	
Kimble County Courthouse		Junction, Kimble County	1929 built 2000 RTHL	
Old King County Courthouse		Guthrie, King County	1914 built 1962 RTHL	
King County Courthouse		Guthrie, King County	1982 built	
Kinney County Courthouse		Brackettville, Kinney County	1911 built 2003 RTHL	
Kleberg County Courthouse		Kingsville, Kleberg County	1914 built	
Knox County Courthouse		Benjamin, Knox County	1935 built	
La Salle County Courthouse		Cotulla, La Salle County	1931 built	
Lamar County Courthouse		Paris, Lamar County	1917 built 2000 RTHL	
Lamb County Courthouse		Littlefield, Lamb County	1955 built	
Lampasas County Courthouse		Lampasas, Lampasas County	1883 built 1965 RTHL	
Lavaca County Courthouse		Hallettsville, Lavaca County	1897 or 1899 built 1971 NRHP	
Lee County Courthouse		Giddings, Lee County	1897 built 1968 RTHL	
Leon County Courthouse		Centerville, Leon County	1886 built 1966 built	
Liberty County Courthouse		Liberty, Liberty County	1931 built	
Limestone County Courthouse		Groesbeck, Limestone County	1924 built 1998 RTHL	
Lipscomb County Courthouse		Lipscomb, Lipscomb County	1916 built 2000 RTHL	
Live Oak County Courthouse		George West, Live Oak County	1919 built	
Llano County Courthouse		Llano, Llano County	1893 built 1980 RTHL	
Loving County Courthouse		Mentone, Loving County	1936 built	
Lubbock County Courthouse		Lubbock, Lubbock County	1950 built	
Lynn County Courthouse		Tahoka, Lynn County	1916 built 2008 RTHL	
Madison County Courthouse		Madisonville, Madison County	1970 built	
Marion County Courthouse		Jefferson, Marion County	1912 built 2002 RTHL	
Martin County Courthouse		Stanton, Martin County	1975 built	
Mason County Courthouse		Mason, Mason County	1909 built 1974 NRHP; 1988 RTHL	Destroyed by arson on February 4, 2021.
Matagorda County Courthouse		Bay City, Matagorda County	1965 built	
Maverick County Courthouse		Eagle Pass, Maverick County	1885 built 1971 RTHL	
Maverick County Courthouse (1979)			1979 built	
McCulloch County Courthouse		Tahoka, McCulloch County; 31°08′6.4″N 99°20′5.8″W	1900 built 1967 RTHL; 1977 NRHP	The second courthouse to serve McCulloch County, Richardson Romanesque in style, never having had clocks installed as intended on the four sides of its clock tower. Flooded in 1936 and 1938.
McLennan County Courthouse		Waco, McLennan County	1901 built 1970 RTHL	
McMullen County Courthouse		Tilden, McMullen County	1930 built	
Medina County Courthouse		Hondo, Medina County	1893 built 1984 RTHL	
Menard County Courthouse		Menard, Menard County	1932 built 2003 RTHL	
Midland County Courthouse		Midland, Midland County	1983 built	Fourth courthouse to serve Midland County, originally the Heritage Building renovated in 2008 and reopened as the courthouse in 2010.
Milam County Courthouse		Cameron, Milam County	1892 built	
Mills County Courthouse		Goldthwaite, Mills County	1913 built 2002 RTHL	
Mitchell County Courthouse		Colorado City, Mitchell County	1924 built	
Montague County Courthouse		Montague, Montague County	2003 restored 2013 RTHL	
Montgomery County Courthouse		Conroe, Montgomery County		
Moore County Courthouse		Dumas, Moore County	1930 built	
Old Morris County Courthouse		Daingerfield, Morris County	1882 built	
Morris County Courthouse		Daingerfield, Morris County	1973 built	
Motley County Courthouse		Matador, Motley County	1948 built	
Nacogdoches County Courthouse		Nacogdoches, Nacogdoches County		
Navarro County Courthouse		Corsicana, Navarro County	1983 RTHL	
Newton County Courthouse		Newton, Newton County	1974 RTHL	
Nolan County Courthouse		Sweetwater, Nolan County	1977 built	
Old Nueces County Courthouse		Corpus Christi, Nueces County	1914 built 1976 RTHL	
Nueces County Courthouse		Corpus Christi, Nueces County	1977 built	
Ochiltree County Courthouse		Perryton, Ochiltree County	1928 built	
Old Oldham County Courthouse		Tascosa, Oldham County	1884 built 1965 RTHL	
Oldham County Courthouse		Vega, Oldham County	1915 built	
Orange County Courthouse		Orange, Orange County	1937 built	
Palo Pinto County Courthouse		Palo Pinto, Palo Pinto County		
Panola County Courthouse		Carthage, Panola County	1953 built	
Parker County Courthouse		Weatherford, Parker County	1884-86 built 1965 RTHL	Second Empire style, designed by W.C. Dodson.
Parmer County Courthouse		Farwell, Parmer County	1962 RTHL	
Pecos County Courthouse		Fort Stockton, Pecos County	1883 built 1966 RTHL	
Polk County Courthouse		Livingston, Polk County	1924 built 2001 RTHL	
Potter County Courthouse		Amarillo, Potter County	1932 built 1996 RTHL	
Presidio County Courthouse		Marfa, Presidio County	1887 built 1964 RTHL	
Rains County Courthouse		Emory, Rains County	2002 RTHL	
Randall County Courthouse		Canyon, Randall County; 34°58′45.6″N 101°55′41.5″W	1965 RTHL	
Old Reagan County Courthouse		Stiles, Reagan County	1969 RTHL	
Reagan County Courthouse		Big Lake, Reagan County		
Real County Courthouse		Leakey, Real County	2000 RTHL	
Red River County Courthouse		Clarksville, Red River County	1966 RTHL	
Reeves County Courthouse		Pecos, Reeves County		
Refugio County Courthouse		Refugio, Refugio County	1917, 1951 built 2002 NRHP	Built in 1917 in a Mission style, it was enlarged and renovated in 1951 into a Moderne style design by Irving H. Dunbar.
Roberts County Courthouse		Miami, Roberts County	1913 built 2000 RTHL	
Robertson County Courthouse		Franklin, Robertson County	1968 RTHL	A different courthouse for the county, listed on the National Register as Hammond House, was designed and built in Calvert, but it was not completed before the county seat was switched from Calvert to Franklin.
Rockwall County Courthouse		Rockwall, Rockwall County		
Runnels County Courthouse		Ballinger, Runnels County	1967 RTHL	
Rusk County Courthouse		Henderson, Rusk County		
Sabine County Courthouse		Hemphill, Sabine County		
San Augustine County Courthouse		San Augustine, San Augustine County	1927 built 2001 RTHL	
San Jacinto County Courthouse		Coldspring, San Jacinto County	2000 RTHL	
San Patricio County Courthouse		Sinton, San Patricio County		
San Saba County Courthouse		San Saba, San Saba County	2004 RTHL	
Schleicher County Courthouse		Eldorado, Schleicher County	1991 RTHL	
Scurry County Courthouse		Snyder, Scurry County		
Shackelford County Courthouse		Albany, Shackelford County	1962 RTHL	
Shelby County Courthouse		Center, Shelby County	1969 RTHL	
Sherman County Courthouse		Stratford, Sherman County	2008 RTHL	
Smith County Courthouse		Tyler, Smith County		
Somervell County Courthouse		Glen Rose, Somervell County	1979 built 1963 RTHL	
Starr County Courthouse		Rio Grande City, Starr County		
Stephens County Courthouse		Breckenridge, Stephens County	1997 RTHL	
Sterling County Courthouse		Sterling City, Sterling County		
Stonewall County Courthouse		Aspermont, Stonewall County		
Sutton County Courthouse		Sonora, Sutton County	1891; 1962 RTHL; 1977 NRHP	Designed in Second Empire style by architect Oscar Ruffini
Swisher County Courthouse		Tulia, Swisher County	1962 RTHL	
Tarrant County Courthouse		Fort Worth, Tarrant County	1895 built 1969 RTHL	
1915 Taylor County Courthouse		Abilene, Taylor County	1915 built	
Taylor County Courthouse		Abilene, Taylor County	1972 built	
Terrell County Courthouse		Sanderson, Terrell County	1906 built	
Terry County Courthouse		Brownfield, Terry County	1926 built	
Throckmorton County Courthouse		Throckmorton, Throckmorton County	1890 built 2008 RTHL	
Titus County Courthouse		Mount Pleasant, Titus County	1940 built	
Tom Green County Courthouse		San Angelo, Tom Green County	1928 built	
Travis County Courthouse		Austin, Travis County	1931 built	
Trinity County Courthouse		Groveton, Trinity County	1914 built 2004 RTHL	
Tyler County Courthouse		Woodville, Tyler County	1891, 1935 built 2000 RTHL	Built in 1891 in Italianate style; extensively renovated in 1936.
Upshur County Courthouse		Gilmer, Upshur County	1933 built	
Upton County Courthouse		Rankin, Upton County	1926 built	
Uvalde County Courthouse		Uvalde, Uvalde County	1927 built 1983 RTHL	
Val Verde County Courthouse		Del Rio, Val Verde County	1887 built	
Van Zandt County Courthouse		Canton, Van Zandt County	1937 built 1999 RTHL	
Old Victoria County Courthouse		Victoria, Victoria County	1892 built 1961 RTHL	
Victoria County Courthouse		Victoria, Victoria County	1967 built	
Walker County Courthouse		Huntsville, Walker County	1970 built	
Waller County Courthouse		Hempstead, Waller County	1955 built	
Ward County Courthouse		Gilmer, Ward County	1940 built	
Washington County Courthouse		Brenham, Washington County	1939 built 1985 RTHL	
Webb County Courthouse		Laredo, Webb County	1909 built	
Wharton County Courthouse		Wharton, Wharton County	1889 built 2007 RTHL	
Wheeler County Courthouse		Wheeler, Wheeler County	1925 built 2000 RTHL	
Wichita County Courthouse		Wichita Falls, Wichita County	1980 built	
Wilbarger County Courthouse		Vernon, Wilbarger County	1932 built	
Willacy County Courthouse		Raymondville, Willacy County	1922 built 2016 RTHL	
Williamson County Courthouse		Georgetown, Williamson County	1911 built 1988 RTHL	
Wilson County Courthouse		Floresville, Wilson County	1884 built 1984 RTHL	Designed by British-born architect Alfred Giles in Italianate style.
Winkler County Courthouse		Kermit, Winkler County	1929 built 1988 RTHL	
Wise County Courthouse		Decatur, Wise County	1896 built 1964 RTHL	
Wood County Courthouse		Quitman, Wood County	1925 built 2003 RTHL	
Yoakum County Courthouse		Plains, Yoakum County	1949 built	
Young County Courthouse		Graham, Young County	1932 built	
Zapata County Courthouse		Zapata, Zapata County	2006 built	
Zavala County Courthouse		Crystal City, Zavala County	1970 built	

== See also ==
- List of United States federal courthouses in Texas
- List of courthouses in the United States
