= Llano County Courthouse and Jail =

- U.S. National Register of Historic Places
- U.S. Historic district – Contributing property
- Texas State Antiquities Landmark
- Recorded Texas Historic Landmark
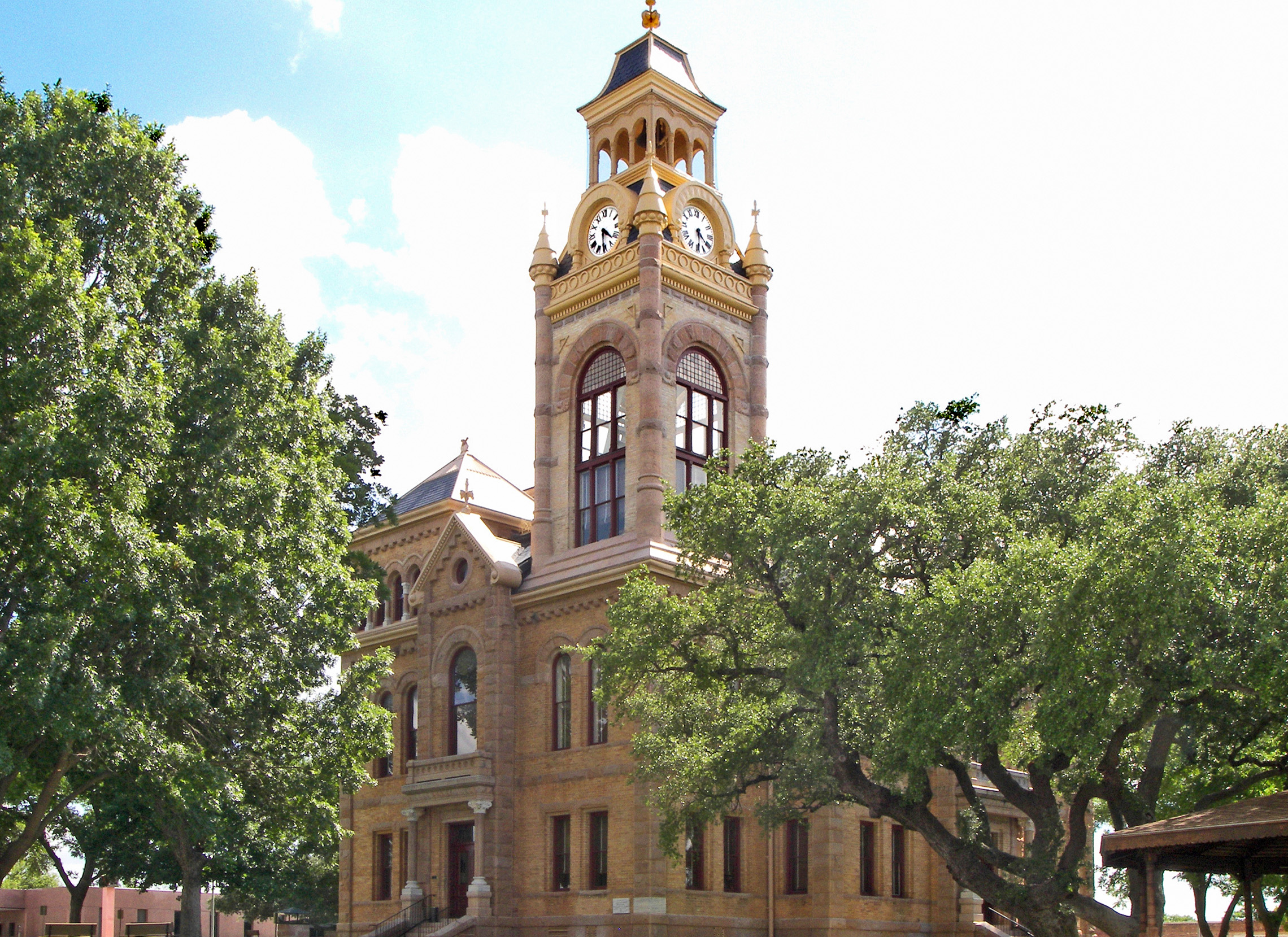
- Llano County Courthouse in 2010

- Location within Texas Location within the United States
- Interactive map showing the location of Llano County Courthouse and Jail
- Location: Courthouse: Public Square, 107 W. Sandstone St. Jail: 700 Oatman St. Llano, Texas
- Coordinates: 30°44′59″N 98°40′35″W
- Area: 0.4 acres (0.16 ha)
- Built: Courthouse: 1893; Jail: 1895
- Built by: Courthouse: J. A. and G. H. Wilson; Jail: Pauly Jail Building and Manufacturing Company
- Architect: Courthouse: A.O. Watson; Jail: F.W. and W.S. Hull
- Architectural style: Romanesque
- Part of: Courthouse: Llano County Courthouse Historic District (ID88002542)
- NRHP reference No.: 77001459
- TSAL No.: 447
- RTHL No.: Courthouse: 9446; Jail: 9448

Significant dates
- Added to NRHP: December 2, 1977
- Designated CP: Courthouse: February 10, 1989
- Designated TSAL: May 28, 1981
- Designated RTHL: Courthouse: 1980; Jail: 1979

The Llano County Courthouse and Jail were erected separately, but added to the National Register of Historic Places in Texas on December 2, 1977, as one entry. The courthouse, located in the middle of Llano's historic square, was built in 1893. The exterior is made of sandstone, marble, and granite. The interior of the courthouse was damaged by fire in 1932 and again in 1951. It is still in use today by local government. The jail was erected in 1895, with the prisoner cells on the second and third floors, and the ground level solely for the office and living accommodations for the sheriff and his family. The jail was designated a Recorded Texas Historic Landmark 1979, Marker 9448. The courthouse was designated a Recorded Texas Historic Landmark 1980, Marker number 9446.

== The four courthouses of Llano County ==
The present courthouse is Llano County's fourth, one of which was only for temporary purposes.

=== 1859–1880 courthouse ===
The original 1859 box-like structure courthouse burned down in 1880, destroying all the county records.

=== 1880–1885 temporary courthouse ===
Architect C.S. Jones and builder J. K. Finely erected the $1550 a temporary courthouse in 1880, pending the construction of a permanent structure. Its two rooms contained a fireproof vault, with one room being for county administrative personnel, and the second room for the legal and law enforcement personnel.

=== 1885–1892 courthouse ===
A new courthouse was erected in 1885, designed by architect Alfred Giles, who also designed the Brooks County Courthouse, Fredericksburg Memorial Library, Kendall County Courthouse, Live Oak County Courthouse, Presidio County Courthouse, Wilson County Courthouse, as well as courthouses in the counties of Goliad and Kerr The structure mirrored exactly the 1882 Gillespie County courthouse, and was temporarily rented for church services. This structure burned down January 22, 1892. County records were saved. Remains of the building were sold.

=== 1893–present courthouse ===
The current two-story courthouse was designed in a Romanesque Revival style by A.O. Watson and Jacob Laramour, also architects of Llano's 1891 Badu Building. Watson also designed the DeWitt County courthouse. The firm of J. A. and G. H. Wilson of Sulphur Springs, Texas, was awarded the contract for a brick building trimmed with granite, at a cost of $47,000.

Construction of the present-day courthouse was completed on August 1, 1893. A foundation of granite supports the marble and granite columns, with a brick and stone exterior. F. Heierman and Bros. of Austin manufactured the interior iron stairway treads. Ornamental newels and balusters are of wood. The tower with colonnades and cupola was placed in the southwest corner, accessible only on the south and west. The roof of each corner pavilion section is pyramidal, with the main section truncated pyramid. A clock was added to the tower at a later date.

== Llano County Jail ==
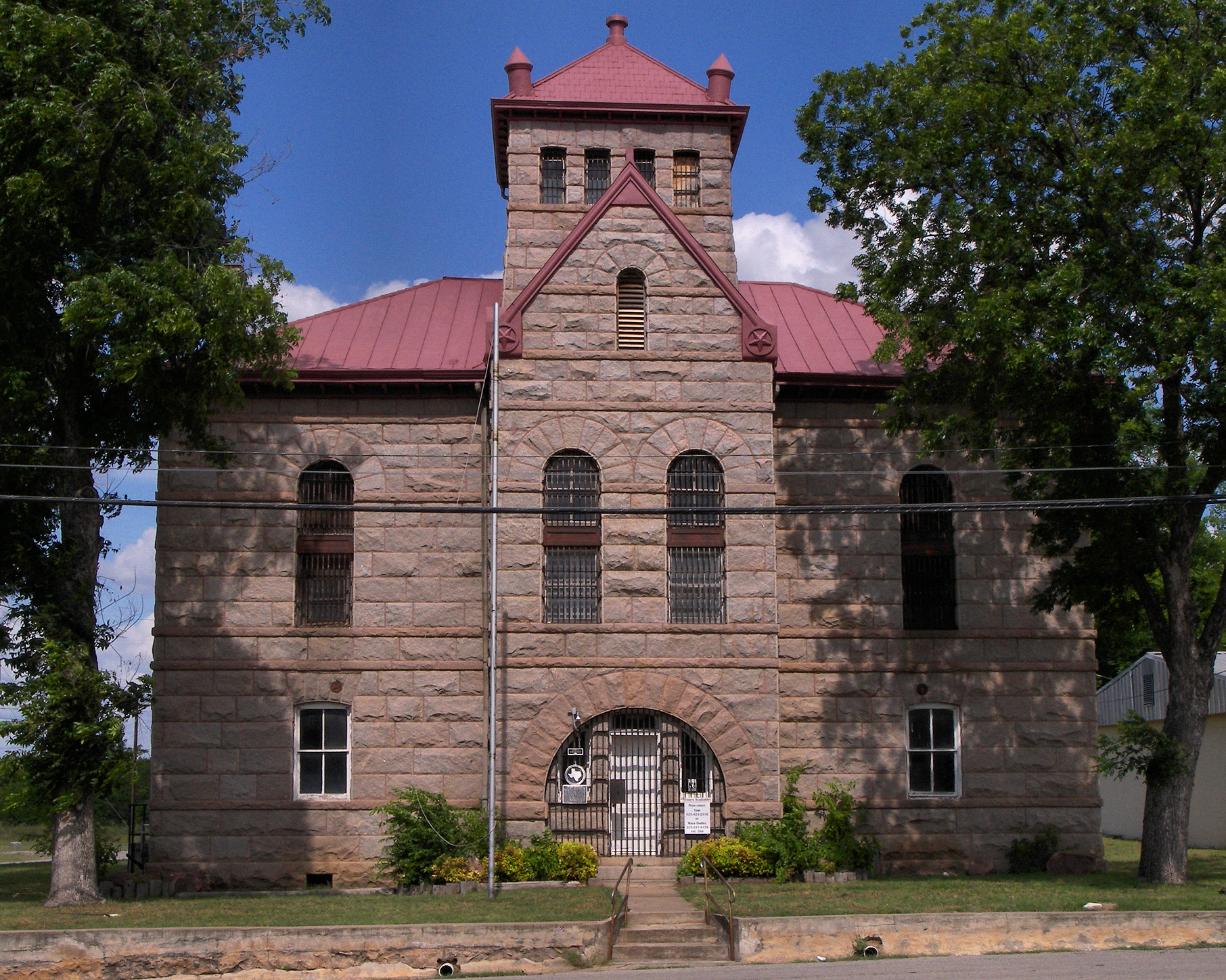
The former Llano County Jail in 2010

The Llano County Jail was designed by F.W. and W.S. Hull, and built in 1895 by the Pauly Jail Building and Manufacturing Company of St Louis, Missouri. Gray granite used to build the jail was quarried from within Llano county. The jail, which was also built in a Romanesque Revival style, has been known as "Red Top" for its red roof. The first floor was used by the sheriff and his family for his office and the family living quarters. The second floor had four cells and two drunk tanks. The third and fourth floors housed the gallows.

== See also ==
- National Register of Historic Places listings in Llano County, Texas
- Recorded Texas Historic Landmarks in Llano County
