= Wilson County Courthouse and Jail =

- U.S. National Register of Historic Places
- Texas State Antiquities Landmark
- Recorded Texas Historic Landmark
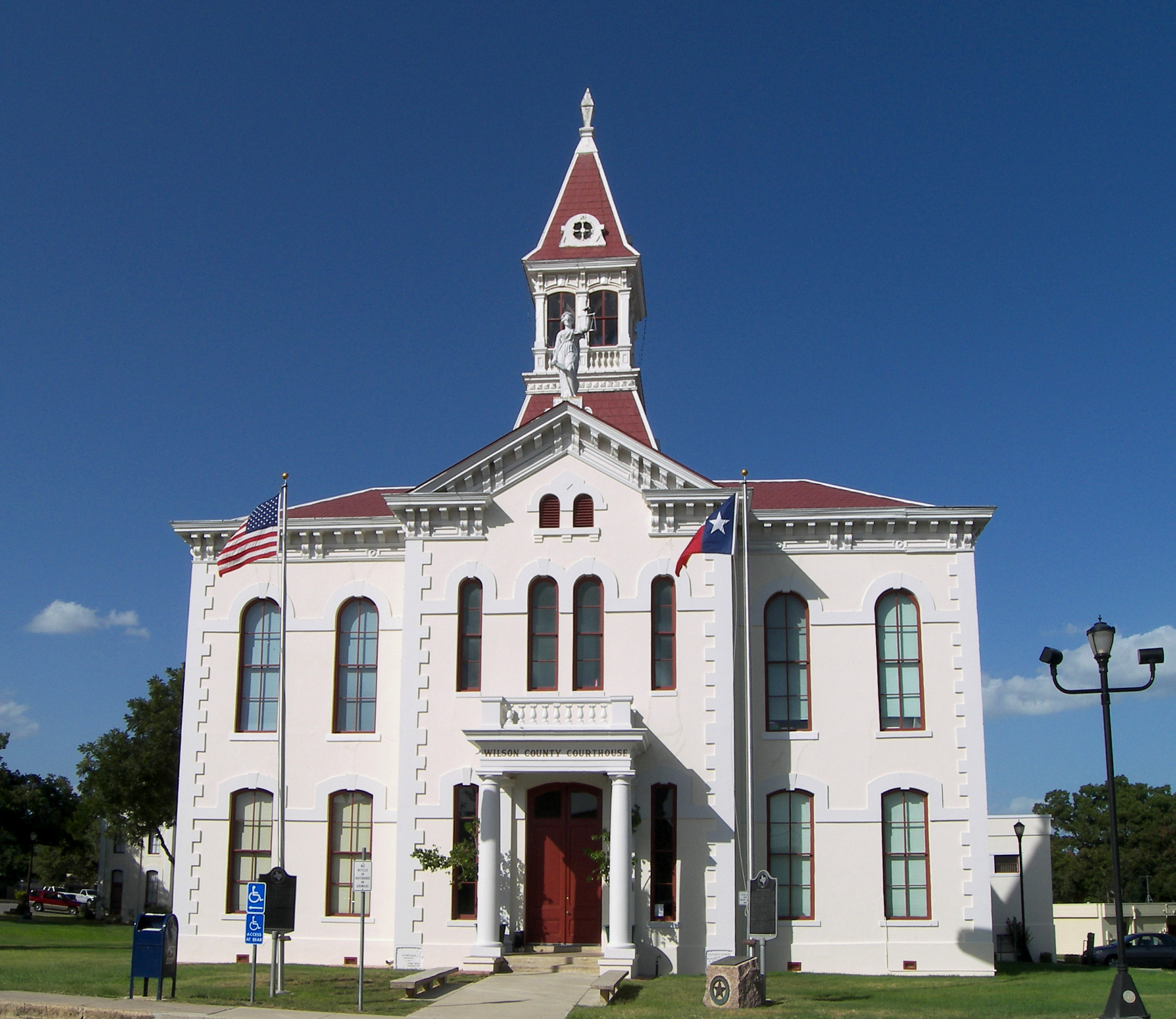
- Wilson County Courthouse in 2008

- Location within Texas Location within the United States
- Interactive map showing the location of Wilson County Courthouse and Jail
- Location: Public Square, Floresville, Texas
- Coordinates: 29°8′0″N 98°9′25″W
- Area: 3 acres (1.2 ha)
- Built: 1884
- Architect: Alfred Giles; James Riely Gordon
- Architectural style: Italianate
- NRHP reference No.: 78003001
- TSAL No.: 698
- RTHL No.: 5856

Significant dates
- Added to NRHP: May 5, 1978
- Designated TSAL: May 28, 1981
- Designated RTHL: 1984

The Wilson County Courthouse and Jail are located in Floresville, Texas. They were added to the National Register of Historic Places in Texas in 1978 and the courthouse as a Recorded Texas Historic Landmark in 1984.

Architect Alfred Giles used local brick for the Italianate design. The courthouse was remodeled in the 1930s, when the bricks were plastered over, and again in the 1950s. Giles also designed the Brooks County Courthouse, Fredericksburg Memorial Library, Live Oak County Courthouse, Presidio County Courthouse, Webb County Courthouse as well as courthouses in the counties of Goliad and Kerr. In 1909, Giles designed the facade of the Kendall County Courthouse. He also designed the 1885 Llano County courthouse, which burned down in 1892.

== Jailhouse Museum ==
In use until 1974, the white brick and stucco cubic jail was designed in 1887 by James Riely Gordon and built at the NE corner of the square. Contractor B.B. Reid erected the building for $14,000. General living quarters are on the ground floor, with the prisoner cells on the second floor separated from the second-floor bedrooms. Pauly Jail Building and Manufacturing Company manufactured the pre-fab cell blocks.

The jail is now operated by the Wilson County Historical Society as the Wilson County Jailhouse Museum. Visitors can view the original jail cells and living quarters for the sheriff. The museum is open 10am to 3pm on the second and fourth Saturday of the month. It is also open for special events like the Floresville Peanut Festival and the Floresville Christmas Tree Lighting and Parade.

== See also ==
- National Register of Historic Places listings in Wilson County, Texas
- List of county courthouses in Texas
- Recorded Texas Historic Landmarks in Wilson County
