= Fredericksburg Memorial Library =

- Pioneer Memorial Library
- U.S. National Register of Historic Places
- Texas State Antiquities Landmark
- Recorded Texas Historic Landmark
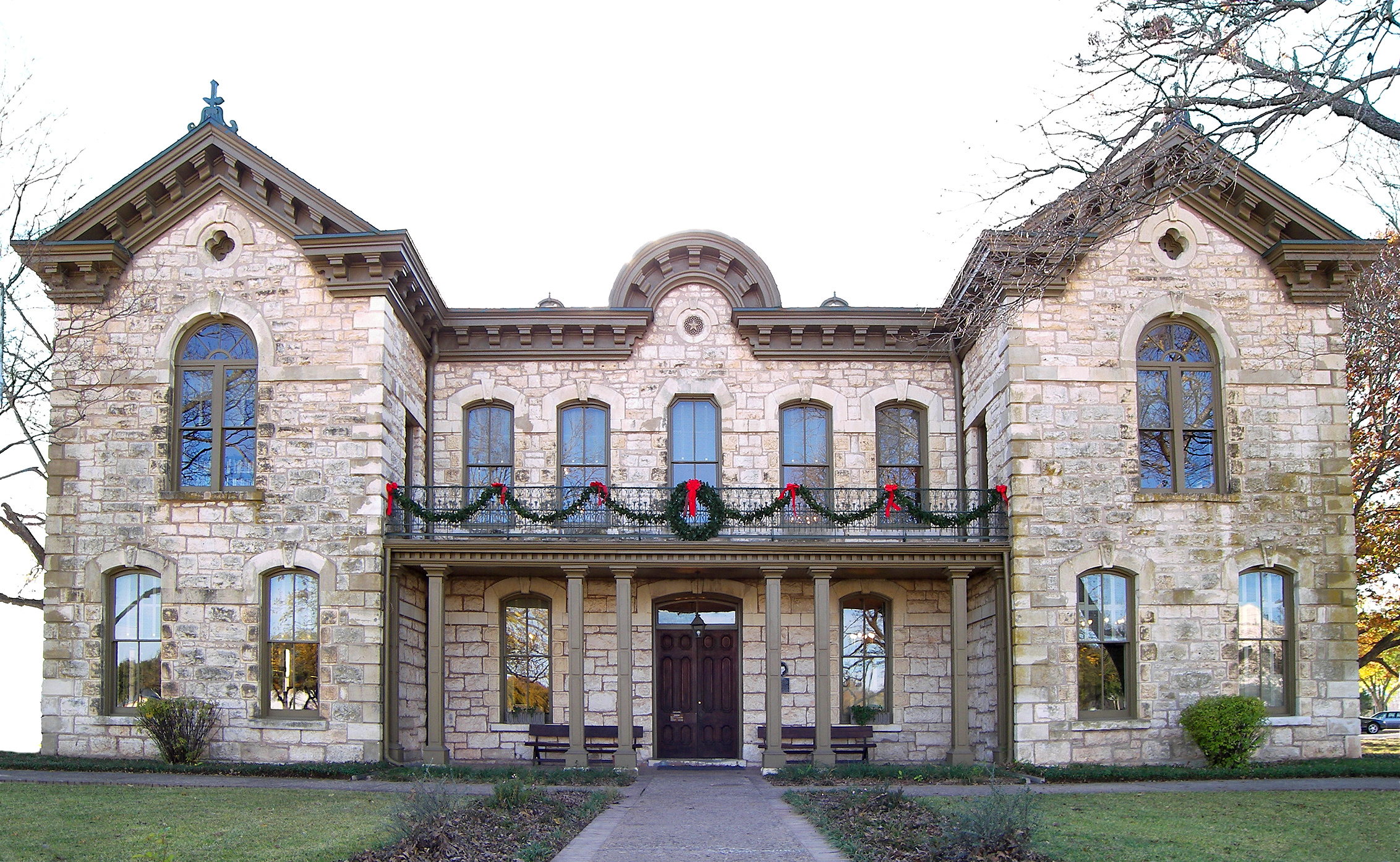
- Fredericksburg Memorial Library

- Location within Texas Location within the United States
- Interactive map showing the location of Fredericksburg Memorial Library
- Location: Courthouse Sq., Fredericksburg, Texas
- Coordinates: 30°16′31″N 98°52′24″W
- Area: 1.5 acres (0.61 ha)
- Built: 1881
- Architect: Alfred Giles
- Architectural style: Romanesque Revival
- NRHP reference No.: 71000935
- TSAL No.: 8200000282
- RTHL No.: 28

Significant dates
- Added to NRHP: March 11, 1971
- Designated TSAL: May 28, 1981
- Designated RTHL: 1967

The Pioneer Memorial Library is located at 115 W. Main Street, Fredericksburg, Gillespie County, in the U.S. state of Texas. Designed by Alfred Giles, it was built in 1882 to replace the original 1855 courthouse, and was later superseded by the current 1939 courthouse designed by Edward Stein. The first floor houses the Children's Section, while the second floor houses the Adult Section, Texas Room, and newspapers and magazines. It is also called the McDermott Building because of the 1967 and 1984 restorations funded by Mr. & Mrs. Eugene McDermott. It was added to the National Register of Historic Places in 1971, and was designated a Recorded Texas Historic Landmark in 1967.

== Construction ==
The native limestone structure was designed in 1882 by architect Alfred Giles in the Romanesque Revival style. Giles also designed the Brooks County Courthouse, Live Oak County Courthouse, Presidio County Courthouse, Webb County Courthouse and Wilson County Courthouse, as well as courthouses in the counties of Goliad and Kerr. In 1909, Giles designed the facade of the Kendall County Courthouse. He also designed the 1885 Llano County courthouse, which burned down in 1892. On November 28, 1881. Giles was commissioned for $1,000 by the Gillespie County Commissioners. Built of local limestone, the Dietz Quarries supplied the limestone for the main structure, while John Dechert Quarries of Luckenbach supplied the limestone for the trim. Building contractors John Heinen & James A. Courtney erected the structure at a cost of $23,000.

== Restoration ==
When a new courthouse was built in 1939, the old building served a variety of uses, until its state of disrepair forced it to be condemned in 1963. The building was restored in 1967 as a home for the library, a gift from Texas Instruments founder and Dallas philanthropists Mr. & Mrs. Eugene McDermott. Eugene McDermott died in 1973. A second renovation of the library occurred in 1984 with matching funds from Mrs. McDermott and the community.

== See also ==
- National Register of Historic Places listings in Gillespie County, Texas
- Recorded Texas Historic Landmarks in Gillespie County
