= Gray County Courthouse =

Gray County Courthouse may refer to:

- Gray County Courthouse (Kansas), Cimmaron, Kansas
- Old Gray County Courthouse, Cimarron, Kansas
- Gray County Courthouse (Texas), Pampa, Texas
