= Southern Hotel (Llano, Texas) =

- U.S. National Register of Historic Places
- Recorded Texas Historic Landmark
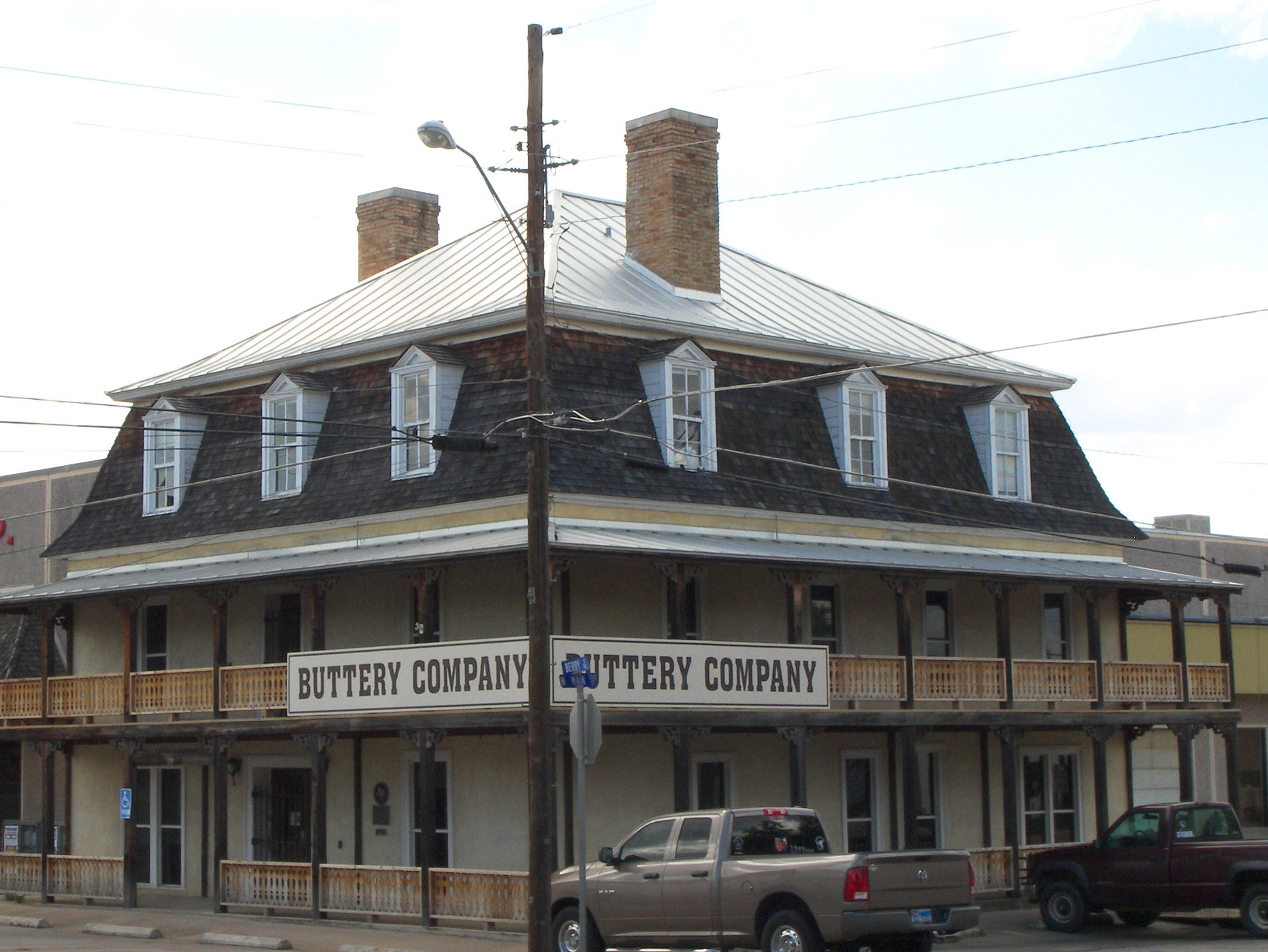
- Southern Hotel in 2010

- Location within Texas Location within the United States
- Location: 201 W. Main St. Llano, Texas
- Coordinates: 30°45′01″N 98°40′35″W
- Area: less than one acre
- Built: 1881
- Architectural style: Second Empire
- NRHP reference No.: 79002992
- RTHL No.: 9455

Significant dates
- Added to NRHP: October 10, 1979
- Designated RTHL: 1981

The Southern Hotel in Llano, Texas was constructed circa 1881 by stonemasons J. K. Finlay and John Goodman in the Second Empire style for owner J.W. Owen. Originally built as a stagecoach stop between Mason and Burnet, it later served as both a hotel and a boarding house. Initially a two-story building, a third floor was added when Colonel W.A.H. Miller bought the hotel in 1883. It was later renamed the Colonial Inn and ceased operations in the 1950s.

The hotel was designated a Recorded Texas Historic Landmark in 1980 (Marker number 9455) and was added to the National Register of Historic Places in Texas on October 10, 1979.

== See also ==
- National Register of Historic Places listings in Llano County, Texas
- Recorded Texas Historic Landmarks in Llano County
