= National Register of Historic Places listings in Gray County, Texas =

Location of Gray County in Texas

This is a list of the National Register of Historic Places listings in Gray County, Texas.

This is intended to be a complete list of properties listed on the National Register of Historic Places in Gray County, Texas. There are eight properties and districts listed on the National Register in the county. Four of these properties are also Recorded Texas Historic Landmarks.

This National Park Service list is complete through NPS recent listings posted July 11, 2025.

== Current listings ==
The locations of National Register properties may be seen in a mapping service provided.

| | Name on the Register | Image | Date listed | Location | City or town | Description |
|---|---|---|---|---|---|---|
| 1 | Central Fire Station | Central Fire Station | December 30, 1999 (#99001623) | 203 W. Foster; 35°32′06″N 100°57′44″W | Pampa | |
| 2 | Combs-Worley Building | Combs-Worley Building | December 30, 1999 (#99001625) | 120 W. Kingsmille; 35°32′12″N 100°57′46″W | Pampa | Recorded Texas Historic Landmark |
| 3 | Gray County Courthouse | Gray County Courthouse | February 20, 1998 (#98000142) | 205 N. Russell; 35°32′12″N 100°57′50″W | Pampa | Recorded Texas Historic Landmark |
| 4 | McLean Commercial Historic District | McLean Commercial Historic District | December 20, 2006 (#06001153) | Roughly bounded by Railroad, Rowe, Second and Gray Sts. 35°13′58″N 100°36′09″W | McLean | |
| 5 | Pampa City Hall | Pampa City Hall | December 30, 1999 (#99001622) | 200 W. Foster; 35°32′08″N 100°57′46″W | Pampa | Recorded Texas Historic Landmark |
| 6 | Schneider Hotel | Schneider Hotel | December 19, 1985 (#85003215) | 120 S. Russell; 35°32′04″N 100°57′42″W | Pampa | |
| 7 | US Post Office-Pampa Main | US Post Office-Pampa Main | November 17, 1986 (#86003236) | 120 E. Foster; 35°32′10″N 100°57′36″W | Pampa | Recorded Texas Historic Landmark |
| 8 | White Deer Land Company Building | White Deer Land Company Building | January 14, 2000 (#99001701) | 116 S. Cuyler; 35°32′05″N 100°57′38″W | Pampa | |

== See also ==
- National Register of Historic Places listings in Texas
- Recorded Texas Historic Landmarks in Gray County
