= National Register of Historic Places listings in Wilson County, Texas =

Location of Wilson County in Texas

This is a list of the National Register of Historic Places listings in Wilson County, Texas.

This is intended to be a complete list of properties listed on the National Register of Historic Places in Wilson County, Texas. There are six properties listed on the National Register in the county. One property is a World Heritage Site, another is a State Antiquities Landmark and includes a Recorded Texas Historic Landmark, and two more are also Recorded Texas Historic Landmarks.

This National Park Service list is complete through NPS recent listings posted March 21, 2025.

== Current listings ==
The locations of National Register properties may be seen in a mapping service provided.

	Name on the Register	Image	Date listed	Location	City or town	Description
1	Beauregard Ranch		September 27, 2024 (#100010865)	Address Restricted	Falls City vicinity	
2	Floresville Chronicle-Journal Building		August 17, 2020 (#100005461)	1000 C St. 29°07′57″N 98°09′33″W	Floresville	
3	Mueller Bridge	Mueller Bridge	October 16, 2007 (#07001094)	CR 337 over Cibolo Cr. 29°21′05″N 98°04′28″W	La Vernia	Recorded Texas Historic Landmark
4	Rancho de las Cabras		March 20, 1973 (#73001985)	S of Floresville SE of Hwy 97; 29°05′42″N 98°10′00″W	Floresville	Part of the San Antonio Missions World Heritage Site
5	Whitehall	Whitehall	February 1, 1980 (#80004161)	N of Sutherland Springs on SR 539; 29°19′02″N 98°03′28″W	Sutherland Springs	Recorded Texas Historic Landmark
6	Wilson County Courthouse and Jail	Wilson County Courthouse and Jail	May 5, 1978 (#78003001)	Public Sq. 29°08′00″N 98°09′27″W	Floresville	State Antiquities Landmark, includes Recorded Texas Historic Landmark

== See also ==
- National Register of Historic Places listings in Texas
- Recorded Texas Historic Landmarks in Wilson County
