= Central Fire Station (Pampa, Texas) =

- U.S. National Register of Historic Places
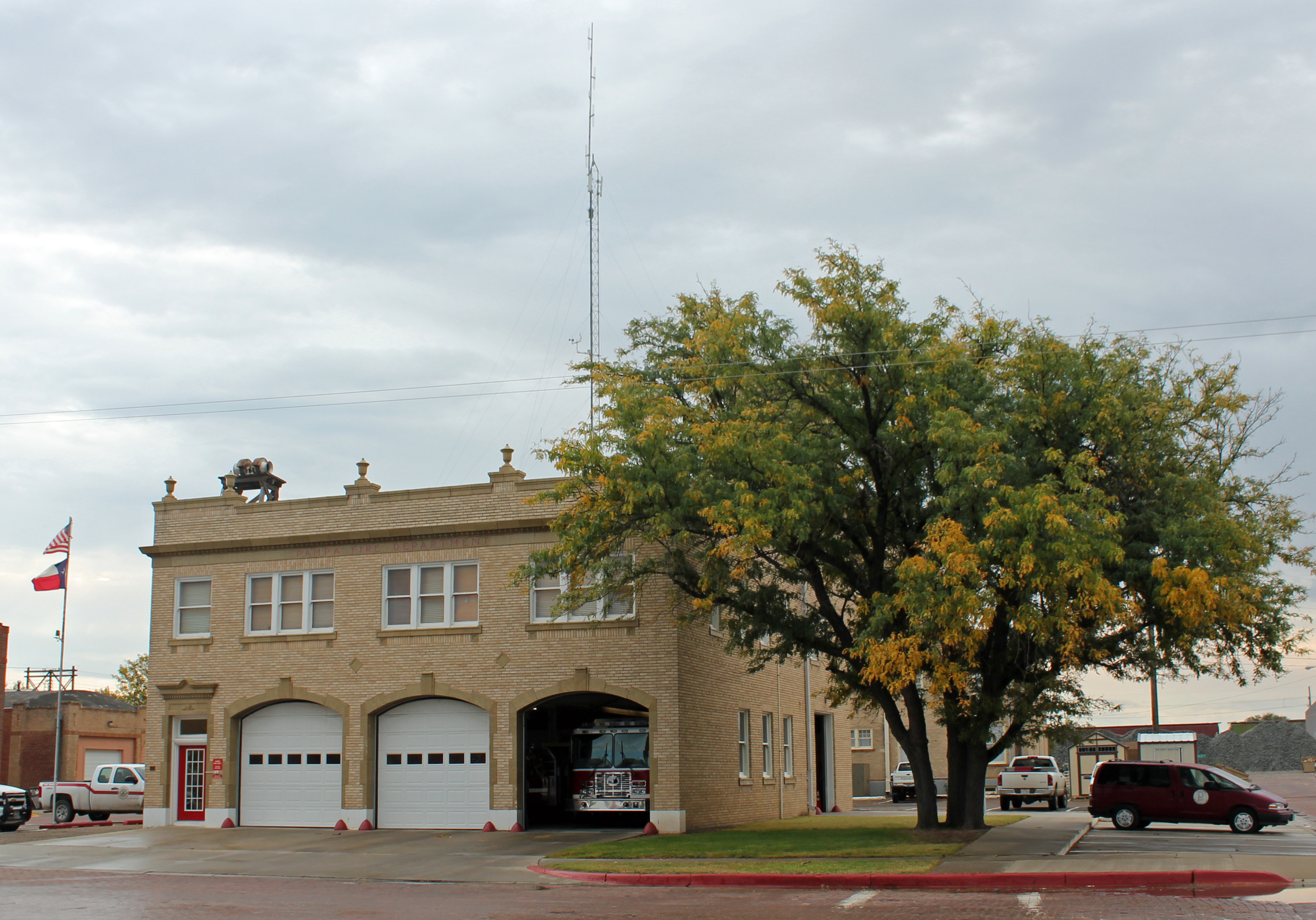
- Central Fire Station in 2015

- Location within Texas Location within the United States
- Location: 203 W. Foster, Pampa, Texas
- Coordinates: 35°32′6″N 100°57′44″W
- Area: less than one acre
- Built: 1930
- Built by: Panhandle Construction
- Architect: W.R. Kaufman & Son
- Architectural style: Beaux Arts
- NRHP reference No.: 99001623
- Added to NRHP: December 30, 1999

The Central Fire Station at 203 W. Foster in Pampa, Texas was built in 1930. It was listed on the National Register of Historic Places in 1999.

It was designed in Beaux Arts style by architect W.R. Kaufman & Son; it was built by Panhandle Construction of Pampa.

== See also ==
- National Register of Historic Places listings in Gray County, Texas
