= H.J. Huck & Co. =

American lumber company in Texas

H. J. Huck & Co. was a lumberyard and construction contracting company in Texas.

The company was founded in 1846 at Indianola, Texas, by German immigrant Henry Joseph Huck (August 3, 1822 – December 18, 1905). He reportedly became "the leading lumbeman and supplier of building materials in the young State of Texas." Huck was also elected first judge of Calhoun County, Texas, and a member of the Indianola Guards. The business was destroyed during the American Civil War, and Huck joined the Confederate Army. Huck resumed business after the war and opened branches in Cuero, Texas, and Victoria, Texas. The business suffered damage in the Gulf Coast hurricanes of 1866 and 1875. He moved the headquarters of the business to Cuero after the 1886 Indianola hurricane destroyed the city, including Huck's business. The Huck Slough Bridge at the south end of Mount Bonnell Road north of Austin, Texas, is named for Judge H. J. Huck's family.

In 1907, the company became known as the Cuero Lumber Co., and eventually became the Alamo Lumber Co..

A number of its works are listed on the National Register of Historic Places.

Works include:

- Bates-Sheppard House, now the DeWitt County Museum, 312 E. Broadway, Cuero, Texas (Huck, H. J.,& Co.), NRHP-listed
- Billow-Thompson House, 402 E. Broadway, Cuero, Texas (Huck, H. J.,& Co.), NRHP-listed
- Callaway-Gillette House, 306 E. Sarah, Cuero, Texas (Huck, H. J., & Co.), NRHP-listed
- Colston-Gohmert House, 309 E. Prairie, Cuero, Texas (Huck, H. J., & Co.), NRHP-listed
- W. H. Crain House, 508 E. Courthouse, Cuero, Texas (Huck, H. J., & Co.), NRHP-listed
- William and L. F. Eichholz House, 308 E. Courthouse, Cuero, Texas (Huck, H. J.,& Co.), NRHP-listed
- Albert and Kate Leinhardt House, 818 E. Morgan, Cuero, Texas (Huck, H. J., & Co.), NRHP-listed
- Meissner-Pleasants House, 108 N. Hunt, Cuero, Texas (Huck, H. J., & Co.), NRHP-listed
- S. I. Ott House, 302 N. Hunt, Cuero, Texas (Huck, H. J., & Co.), NRHP-listed

== See also ==
- Hensley-Gusman House, 2120 Sixth St., Bay City, Texas (Alamo Lumber Co.), NRHP-listed
- Mueller Bridge, CR 337 over Cibolo Cr., La Vernia, Texas (Alamo Construction Co.), NRHP-listed
