= National Register of Historic Places listings in Llano County, Texas =

Location of Llano County in Texas

This is a list of the National Register of Historic Places listings in Llano County, Texas.

This is intended to be a complete list of properties and districts listed on the National Register of Historic Places in Llano County, Texas. There are three districts and four individual properties listed on the National Register in the county. One district is a National Natural Landmark while two other districts contain Recorded Texas Historic Landmarks (RTHLs) including one State Antiquities Landmark that is part of an individual listing along with another RTHL. Two additional individual listings are also RTHLs.

This National Park Service list is complete through NPS recent listings posted March 21, 2025.

== Current listings ==
The locations of National Register properties and districts may be seen in a mapping service provided.

	Name on the Register	Image	Date listed	Location	City or town	Description
1	Austin and Northwestern Railroad Historic District-Fairland to Llano	Austin and Northwestern Railroad Historic District-Fairland to Llano	October 6, 1997 (#97001161)	Roughly along RR tracks from Fairland to Llano; 30°39′38″N 98°26′12″W	Kingsland	Includes Recorded Texas Historic Landmark; extends into Burnet County
2	Badu Building	Badu Building	June 6, 1980 (#80004139)	601 Bessemer Ave. 30°45′24″N 98°40′34″W	Llano	Recorded Texas Historic Landmark
3	Enchanted Rock Archeological District	Enchanted Rock Archeological District	August 29, 1984 (#84001740)	Off Ranch Rd 965 at the Llano-Gillespie County Line; 30°30′16″N 98°49′05″W	Fredericksburg	National Natural Landmark; extends into Gillespie County
4	Llano County Courthouse and Jail	Llano County Courthouse and Jail	December 2, 1977 (#77001459)	Public Sq., Oatman and Haynie Sts. 30°44′59″N 98°40′35″W	Llano	Contains Recorded Texas Historic Landmarks including one State Antiquities Landmark; the courthouse is within the Llano County Courthouse Historic District
5	Llano County Courthouse Historic District	Llano County Courthouse Historic District	February 10, 1989 (#88002542)	Roughly bounded by the Llano River, Ford St., Sandstone St., and Berry St. 30°45′05″N 98°40′34″W	Llano	Contains Recorded Texas Historic Landmarks including one State Antiquities Landmark
6	Southern Hotel	Southern Hotel	October 10, 1979 (#79002992)	201 W. Main St; 30°45′01″N 98°40′38″W	Llano	Recorded Texas Historic Landmark
7	State Highway 29 Bridge at the Colorado River	State Highway 29 Bridge at the Colorado River	October 10, 1996 (#96001116)	TX 29 at the Llano County line 30°44′53″N 98°23′54″W	Buchanan Dam	Extends into Burnet County

== See also ==
- National Register of Historic Places listings in Texas
- Recorded Texas Historic Landmarks in Llano County
