= Mueller Bridge =

- U.S. National Register of Historic Places
- Recorded Texas Historic Landmark
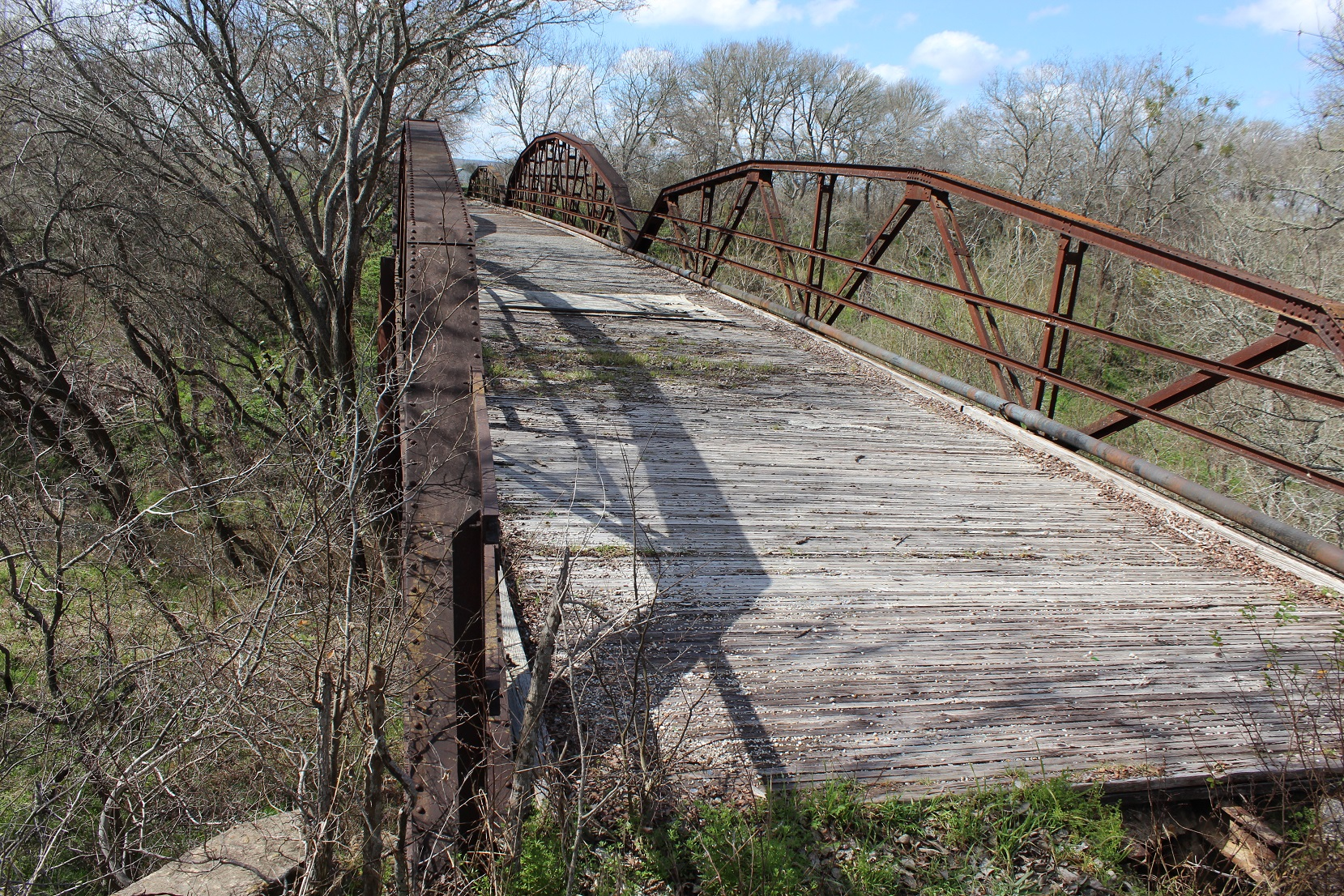
- Mueller Bridge in 2016

- Location within Texas Location within the United States
- Nearest city: La Vernia, Texas
- Coordinates: 29°21′11″N 98°4′28″W
- Area: less than one acre
- Built: 1915
- Built by: Alamo Construction Co.
- Architectural style: Warren polygonal chord truss
- MPS: Historic Bridges of Texas MPS
- NRHP reference No.: 07001094
- RTHL No.: 13258

Significant dates
- Added to NRHP: October 16, 2007
- Designated RTHL: 2004

The Mueller Bridge near La Vernia, Texas, also known as Bridge at McAlister Crossing, is a Warren polygonal chord truss bridge that was built in 1915. It was built by the Alamo Construction Co. It was listed on the National Register of Historic Places in 2007.

== See also ==
- National Register of Historic Places listings in Wilson County, Texas
- List of bridges on the National Register of Historic Places in Texas
- Recorded Texas Historic Landmarks in Wilson County
