= Hillingdon Ranch =

Ranch in Texas, United States

Coordinates: 30°05′27″N 98°52′30″W

Hillingdon Ranch is a 13,000-acre (5,300 ha) working ranch located in Kendall County in the U.S. state of Texas. It was founded in 1887 by architect Alfred Giles, and named after his birthplace Hillingdon, Middlesex, England.
