= Badu Building =

- U.S. National Register of Historic Places
- Recorded Texas Historic Landmark
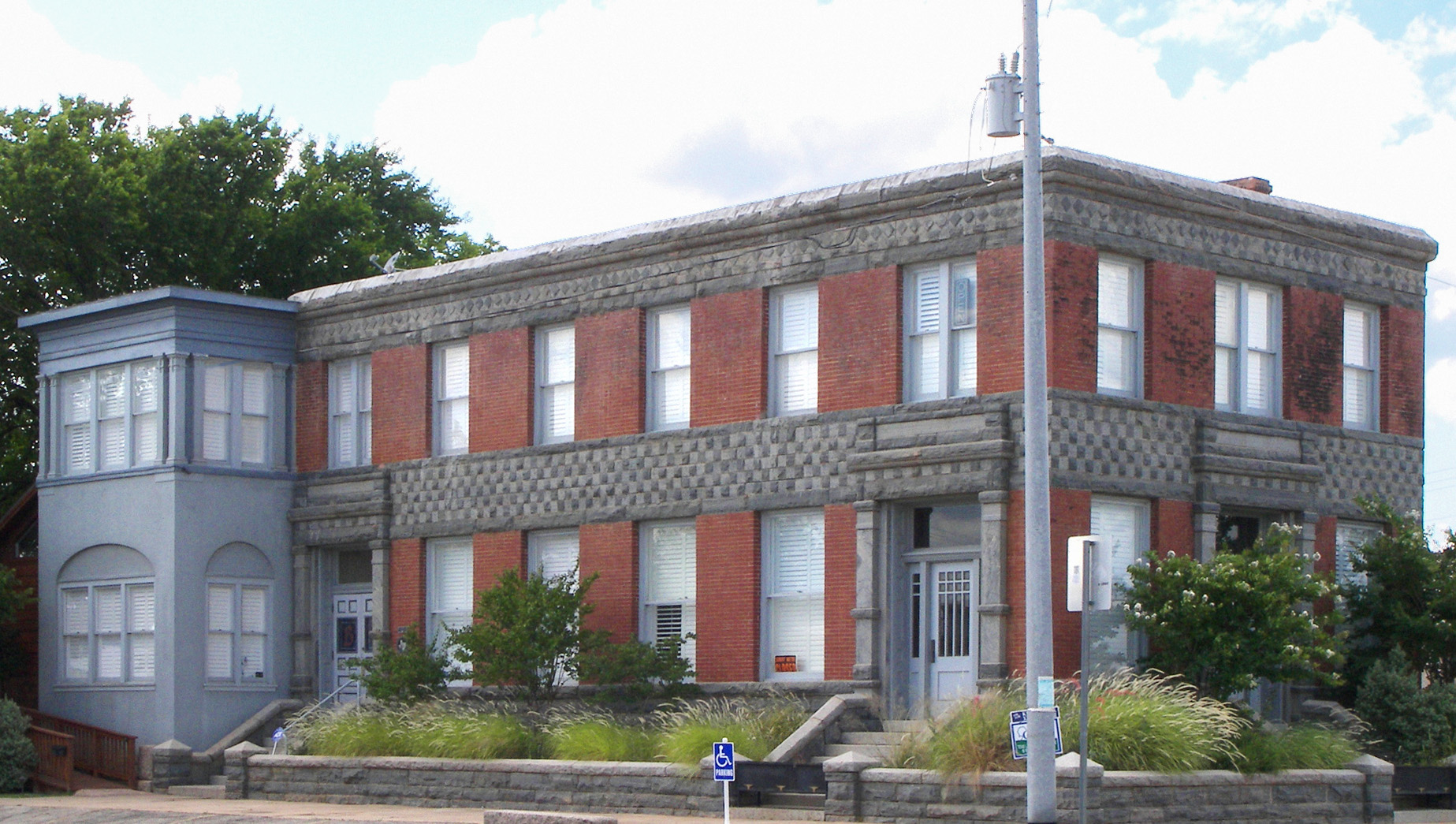
- Badu Building in 2010

- Location within Texas Location within the United States
- Location: 601 Bessemer Avenue; Llano, Texas
- Coordinates: 30°45′24″N 98°40′34″W
- Area: less than one acre
- Built: 1890
- Architect: Larramour and Watson
- Architectural style: Italian Renaissance
- NRHP reference No.: 80004139
- RTHL No.: 9433

Significant dates
- Added to NRHP: June 6, 1980
- Designated RTHL: 1981

The Badu Building is located in the City of Llano, Llano County, Texas. It was added to the National Register of Historic Places listings in Llano County, Texas in 1980, and designated a Recorded Texas Historic Landmark in 1981. It has also been known as the Badu House and as the Carol Phelan Building. It is now being operated as a restaurant and private event space under the name Badu 1891.

Designed by Larramour and Watson, the Badu Building was erected in 1890 by the Llano Improvement and Furnace Company, as the location of the newly chartered First National Bank. The building is constructed of local granite and locally manufactured red brick. The marble-floored street level with its carved wooden interiors were the public access portion of the bank. The second floor was designed for office space. The Llano Improvement and Furnace Company had been organized with the specific purpose of promoting land development in the area, but went bankrupt circa 1894. The building was sold to N. J. Badu in 1898 at a public auction. Until 1980, the building had been continuously owned by members of Badu's family. From 1907 to 1912, the building was leased to the First State Bank of Llano. The Badu family sold it in 1980. It has been used as a bed and breakfast facility, and as a restaurant.

== N.J. Badu ==
N. J. Badu was a native of Nancy, France. Educated and trained as a geologist in Europe, Badu emigrated from France to Mexico. From there, he traveled to New Orleans, eventually finding employment in Texas as an instructor of the French language, in the Lamar County town of Paris. He married a woman from the same county by the name of Charlie Neal. After a subsequent career change, he gained some experience at hotel management in Dallas and Austin. During his tenure in Paris, Badu had heard much about the geology of Llano. He was hired by the Llano Improvement and Furnace Company to manage the Algona Hotel, the area's grand upscale establishment. When the Llano Improvement and Furnace Company went bankrupt, the Algona closed. Badu became employed as a manager of the Driskill Hotel in Austin, but maintained his home in Llano. Badu became a full-time mineralogist, with his laboratory based in Llano.

== See also ==
- National Register of Historic Places listings in Llano County, Texas
- Recorded Texas Historic Landmarks in Llano County
