= W.R. Kaufman & Son =

American architectural firm

W.R. Kaufman & Son was an architectural firm in Texas. William Raymond Kaufman

Several of its works are listed on the National Register of Historic Places.

Works include:

- Central Fire Station, 203 W. Foster Pampa, TX Kaufman, W.R. & Son
- Combs-Worley Building, 120 W. Kingsmille Pampa, TX Kaufman, W.R. & Son
- Gray County Courthouse, 205 N. Russell Pampa, TX Kaufman, W.R., & Son
- Pampa City Hall, 200 W. Foster Pampa, TX Kaufman, W.R. & Son
- White Deer Land Company Building, 116 S. Cuyler Pampa, TX Kaufman & Berry

He designed the

- Freestone County Courthouse (1918–19), in Fairfield, Texas, Classical Revival in style, built by contractor William M. Rice
- Cochran County Courthouse
- Gray County Courthouse

== See also ==
- Union County Courthouse, Court St. Clayton, NM Kaufman, D.P. & Son
