= Alfred Giles (architect) =

American architect (1853–1920)

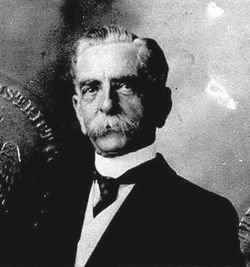
- Giles in 1919
- Born: May 23, 1853; Hillingdon, Middlesex, England,
- Died: August 13, 1920 (aged 67); Hillingdon Ranch; Kendall County, Texas. USA
- Education: Proprietary School at Gravesend, Kent; King's College London
- Occupation: Architect
- Buildings: Historic courthouses Historic private homes

Alfred Giles (May 23, 1853 – August 13, 1920) was a British architect who emigrated to the United States in 1873 at the age of 20. Many of the private homes and public buildings designed by Giles are on the National Register of Historic Places and have been designated Recorded Texas Historic Landmarks. Based in San Antonio, his buildings can be found predominantly in south Texas and northern Mexico. Giles is credited with "a profound influence on architecture in San Antonio."

== Early life ==
Giles was born on May 23, 1853, near Hillingdon, Middlesex, England. His parents were Thomas and Sophie (Brown) Giles. From 1864 to 1868, he attended the Proprietary School at Gravesend, Kent with a goal of entering the ministry in the Church of England. Instead, he chose a career in architecture and apprenticed for two years to Giles and Bivens in London while taking architecture classes at King's College London. The firm hired him after the completion of his apprenticeship. In 1873, Giles moved to New York City.

== Move to Texas ==
Giles moved to the drier climate of San Antonio, Texas, in 1875 for health reasons and spent the next three years working for building contractor John H. Kampmann. After that period, Giles began his own architectural firm, the Alfred Giles Company, which grew to become "the foremost practice in San Antonio."

=== The courthouses ===
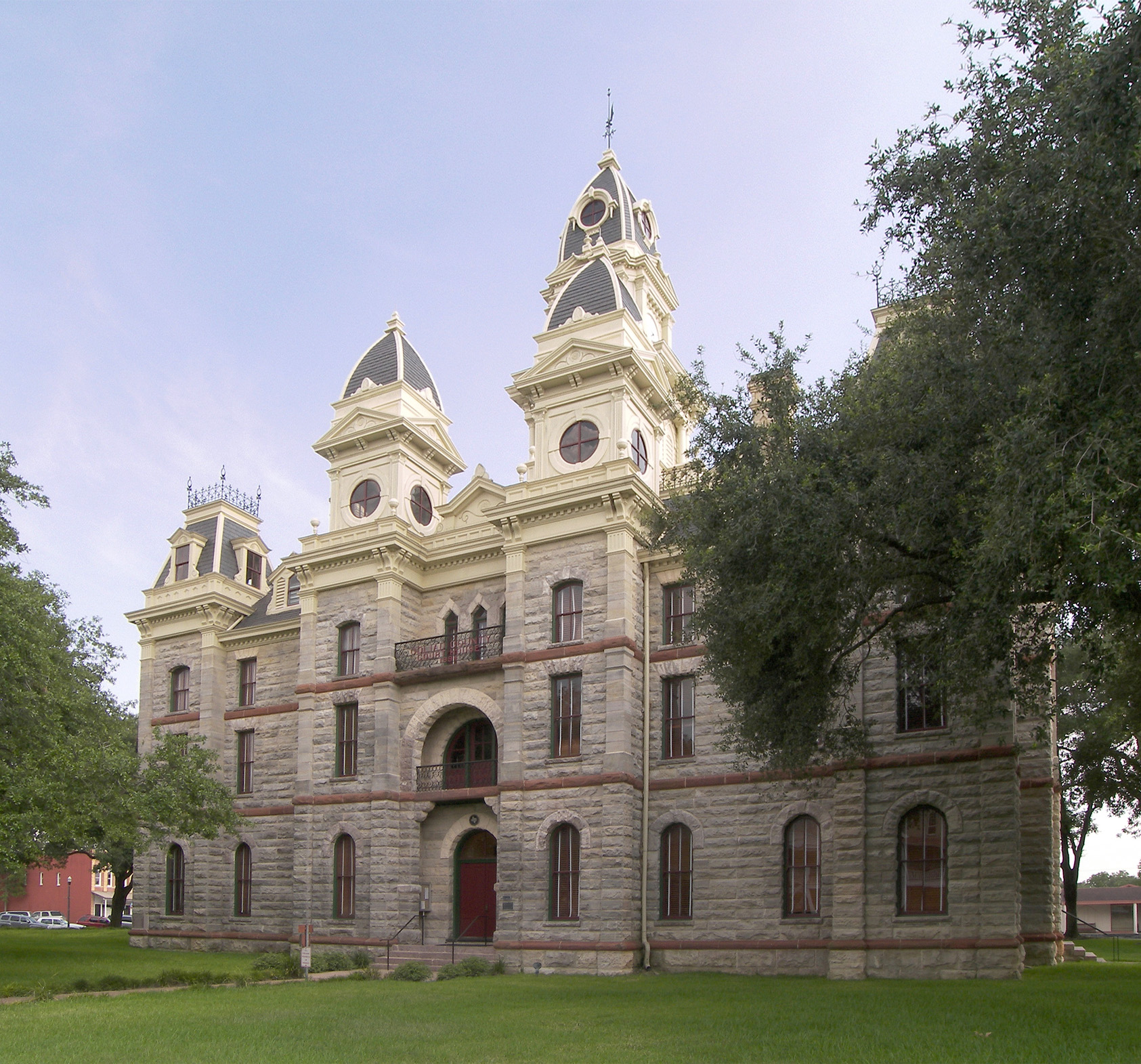
Goliad County Courthouse, built 1894.

Prior to the current Bexar County Courthouse which was constructed in 1896 and designed by James Riely Gordon, the county had its offices in the Masonic Building. Giles was contracted in 1882 to remodel the county offices in that building. D. C. Anderson was the building contractor who did the work, which was completed in 1883.

Alfred Giles added the Bandera County jail in 1881 to the already existing 1880 courthouse designed by B.F. Trester. The two buildings were added to the National Register of Historic Place in 1979 as Bandera County Courthouse and Jail.

In Gillespie County, Giles designed the Romanesque Revival style 1882 Fredericksburg Memorial Library, originally as the county courthouse but now housing the Pioneer Memorial Library. The structure became a Recorded Texas Historic Landmark in 1967, and was added to the National Register of Historic Places in 1971.

In Dimmit County, Giles had been selected in 1883 to design the first Dimmit County Courthouse to be located at 103 N. 5th Street in Carrizo Springs, Texas. The county changed its mind and hired J. C. Breeding & Sons. It is believed, however, that Breeding used plans drawn up by Giles, as the finished Italianate style building resembled others Giles had designed in the same time period. That structure was named a Recorded Texas Historic Marker in 2000.

The Italianate style Wilson County Courthouse was designed by Giles and completed in 1884. It was added to the National Register of Historic Places in 1978, and became a Recorded Texas Historic Landmark in 1984.

Also in the Italianate style was the 1885 Llano County Courthouse Giles designed. That courthouse burned down in 1892 and was replaced.

The Second Empire style Presidio County Courthouse in Marfa was designed by Giles in 1886. It was added to the National Register of Historic Places in 1977. It was designated a Recorded Texas Historic Landmark in 1964. Also in 1886, Giles was hired to design the 1886 Kerr County Courthouse. Contractor D.C. Anderson completed the building for $19,545. That particular courthouse burned down in 1925 and was replaced by the current standing structure.

Three structures have existed as the Guadalupe County Courthouse, 1857, 1858, 1889 and the present structure built in 1935. Alfred Giles was the architect of Guadalupe County's 1889 Italianate style courthouse.

In 1894, Giles designed the Second Empire style Goliad County courthouse. In 1976, it was added to the National Register of Historic Places as part of the larger Goliad County Courthouse Historic District.

Giles submitted a winning bid to design the Beaux-Arts style Webb County Courthouse in 1909. The plans specified yellow brick with white stone and red tile mansard roofs. It was added to the National Register of Historic Places in 1981.

He also designed the 1909 facade added to the Kendall County Courthouse in Boerne. It was designated a Recorded Texas Historic Landmark in 1970. It was added to the National Register of Historic Places in 1980

The Classic revival style Brooks County Courthouse in Falfurrias was designed by Giles in 1914 and designated a Recorded Texas Historic Landmark in 1977 and listed on the National Register of Historic Places in 2012.

The similar Classical Revival style Live Oak County Courthouse was designed by Giles in 1919.

=== Bexar County, San Antonio vicinity ===
In 1880, retired Confederate States Army surgeon Claudius King had Giles design his home. The Dr. Claudius E. R. King House, used as both home and office by the physician, became a Recorded Texas Historical Landmark in 1973.

In 1881, Giles was contracted to design the house for the Commanding General at Fort Sam Houston. The first occupant of the home was Christopher Columbus Augur. Although the 10,830 square feet (1,000 m^{2}), two-story home has been occupied by dozens of base commanders in its history, it became known as the Pershing House after John J. Pershing occupied it in 1917. The Pershing House was put on the National Register of Historic Places in 1977.

The Emil Elmendorf House was designed by Giles in 1884 and added to the National Register of Historic Places in 1980. It became a Recorded Texas Historic Landmark in 1982.

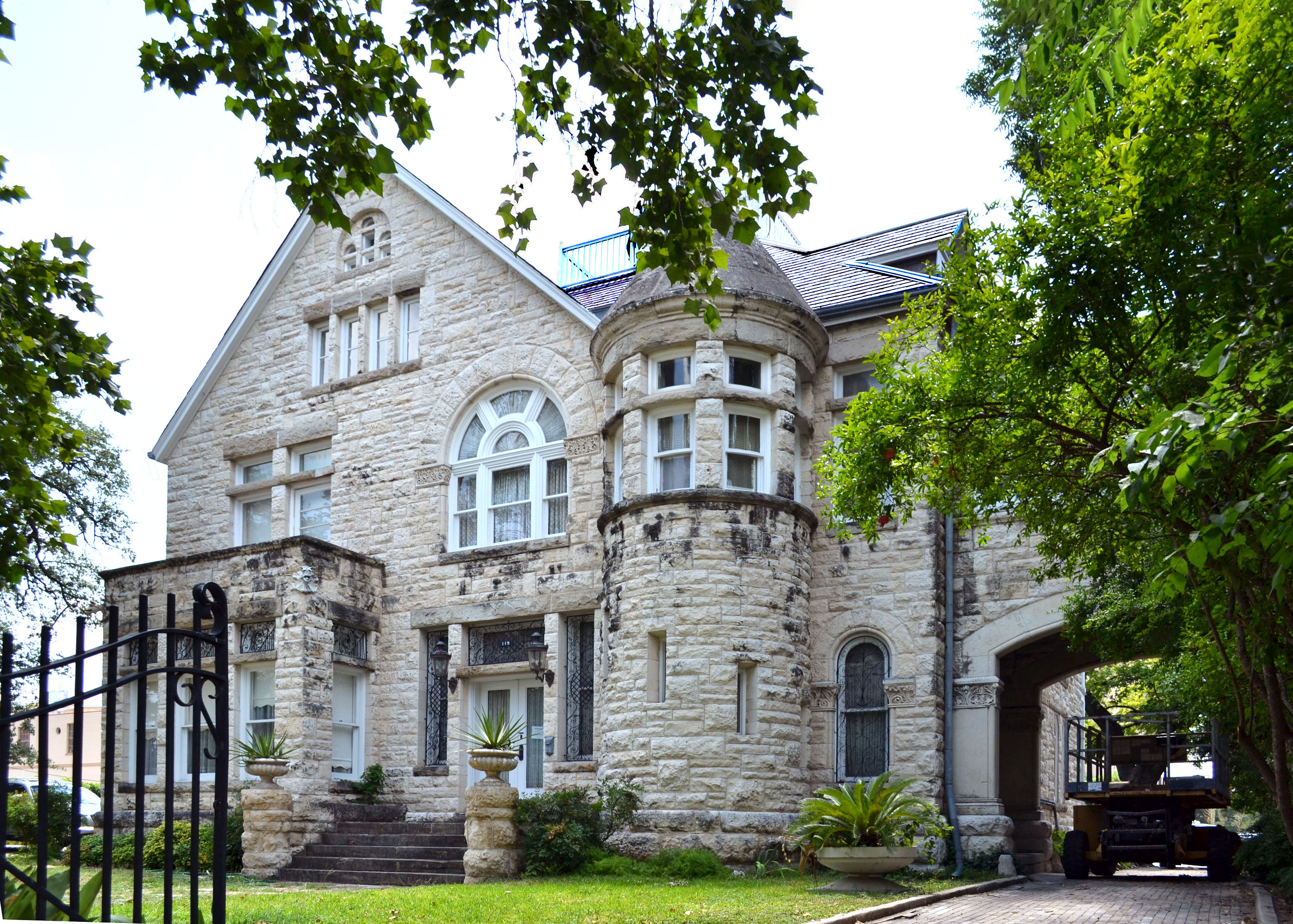
Maverick-Carter house

Giles designed more than 20 buildings for the Maverick family in San Antonio. In 1875, he designed the Albert Maverick Building. In 1877, Giles designed the Italianate style George Maverick House and the Maverick Hotel. In 1882, he designed the Crockett Block for the Maverick family. He also created the Maverick Bank Building. Bexar County realtor William Harvey Maverick contracted with Giles in 1883 to design the Romanesque style Maverick-Carter House, which appeared on the National Register of Historic Places in 1998. That same year of 1883, Giles designed for the Maverick family, the Soledad Block, University Block and the George Maverick Storehouses.

The Lambermont at 950 East Grayson in the Government Hill historical district of San Antonio, Texas, was designed and built by Giles in 1894 for San Antonio politician and United States diplomat Edwin H. Terrell. While serving as United States Ambassador to Belgium, Terrell became fascinated with European castles. Upon his return to Texas, Terrell had Giles design and build the sixteen-room, four-story castle.

At the San Antonio Botanical Garden, the 7,675 square feet (710 m^{2}) Daniel J. Sullivan Stable and Carriage House was designed by Giles in 1896. In 1971, the Hearst Corporation donated the house to the Witte Museum to make way for a parking lot. At a cost of $325,000 in 1988, the San Antonio Conservation Society had the house re-assembled at the botanical gardens. The house re-opened in 1995 at the entrance to the garden.

Giles designed only one church, located at the intersection of Presa and Carolina Street in downtown San Antonio. Construction was completed in 1918 and it was originally a Congregational Church done in a Dutch style; it is currently known as St. Anthony the Great Orthodox Church. It was deemed an historic structure by the San Antonio Conservation Society in 1988. Most records of the church as a Giles building were lost in a fire, but the cornerstone of the building is proof of its origin.

==== King William Historic District ====
In San Antonio's King William neighborhood, the Gothic Revival style Carl Wilhelm August Groos House that Giles designed in 1880, was built for one of the founders of Groos National Bank. It became a Recorded Texas Historic Landmark in 1977.

The Edward Steves Homestead, which became a Recorded Texas Historic Landmark in 1970, is believed to have been designed by Giles while he was an employee of John H. Kampmann.

In 1881, Giles designed the Italianate style Sartor House for jeweler Alexander Sartor Jr. The King William Historic District home became a Recorded Texas Historic Landmark in 1983.

Giles was commissioned in 1881 to remodel a home in the King William Historic District, the Neo-classical style Oge House for business leader and former Texas Ranger Louis Oge. The house was named a Recorded Texas Historic Landmark in 1971.

=== Dimmit County ===
The Asher and Mary Isabelle Richardson House on U.S. Highway 83 in Asherton, was designed by Giles in 1911and added to the National Register of Historic Places in 1988 and designated a Recorded Texas Historic Landmark in 1980.

=== Gillespie County ===
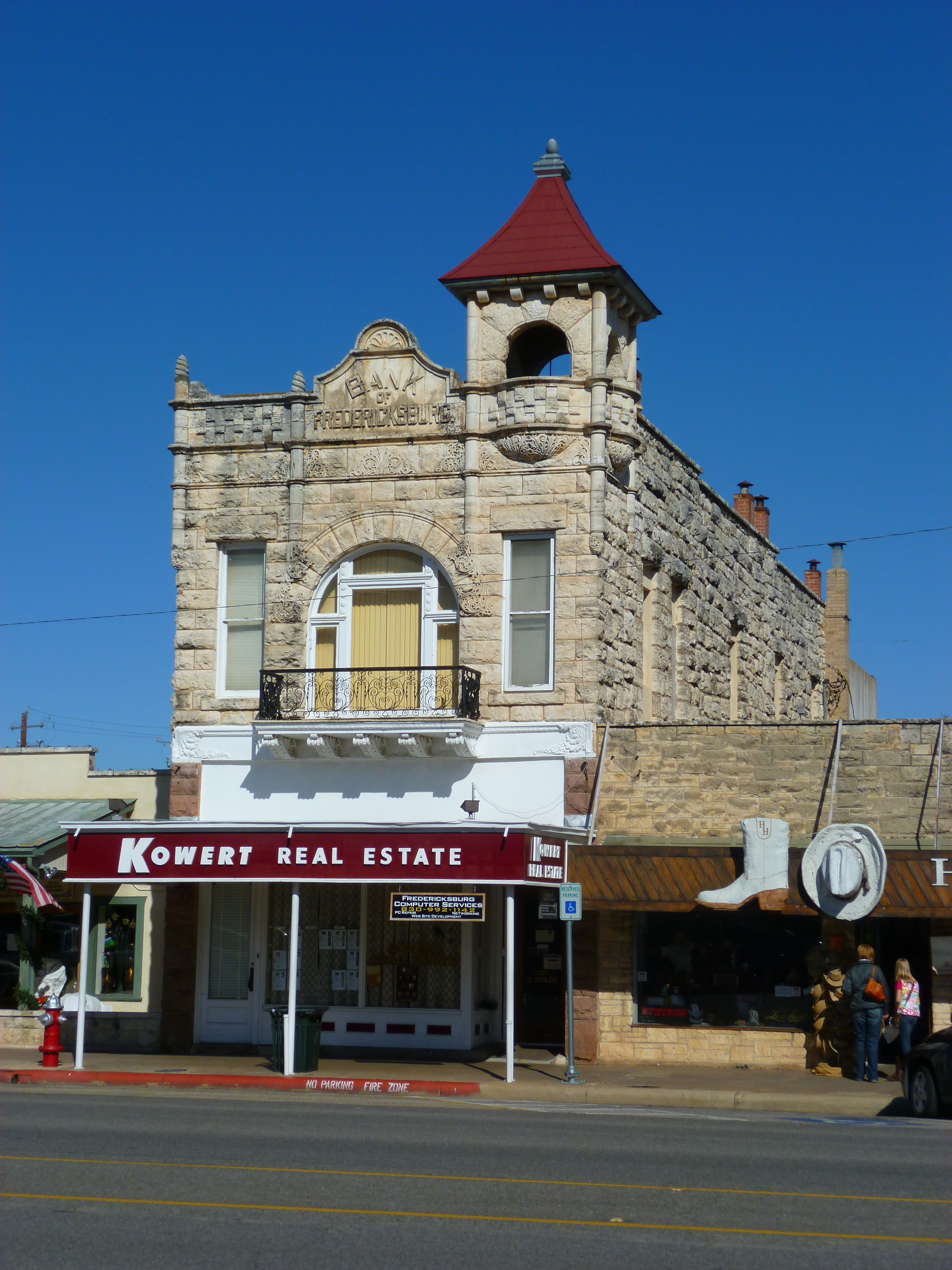
Bank of Fredericksburg

Giles designed three structures within Fredericksburg, and a fourth structure at Morris Ranch. In 1881, he was paid $1,000 to design a new courthouse. The courthouse was completed in 1882. When a new courthouse was built in 1939, the old courthouse became the Fredericksburg Memorial Library and was added to the National Register of Historic Places in 1971. He designed the Morris Ranch Schoolhouse in Gillespie County in 1893. It was added to the National Register of Historic Places in 1983 and designated a Recorded Texas Historic Landmark in 1981. In 1897, Giles designed the Bank of Fredericksburg building, located at 120 E. Main in Fredericksburg. He also designed the Bierschwale home for Gillespie County elected official William Bierschwale.

=== Kendall County ===
In 1879, in what became known as the Comfort Historic District, the completion of the Giles-designed August Faltin Building was constructed by John H. Kampmann. The August Faltin Building was to accommodate Faltin's expanding general store business, and was designated a Recorded Texas Historic Landmark in 1982.

Local Comfort businessman Paul Ingenhuett contracted with Giles to design the original Ingenhuett-Faust Hotel at 818 High Street in 1880, and again contracted with Giles to expand the hotel in 1894. Louis and Matilda Faust operated the hotel from 1909 until 1946. The hotel was designated a Recorded Texas Historic Landmark in 1985. Ingenhuett secured the architectural services of Giles for the 1883 Ingenhuett Store. The store was operated until 2006, when it was destroyed by fire. Paul Ingenhuett again hired Giles in 1891 to design the Ingenhuett-Karger Saloon at 727 High Street.. Hubert Ingenhuett operated the store until it was taken over by Ernst Karger. During the Prohibition years, the building was operated as a grocery store and ice cream parlor. It was designated a Recorded Texas Historical Landmark in 2010. The 1897 Paul Ingenhuett Home at 421 Eighth Street in the Comfort Historic District was also designed by Giles. The home remains in private ownership and was designated a Recorded Texas Historic Landmark in 1979.

The 1919 Old Comfort Post Office at 814 High Street was designed by Giles and operated until 1952. It was designated a Recorded Texas Historic Landmark in 1985.

=== Kerr County ===
The 1879 Capt. Charles Schreiner Mansion, designed by Giles and built at 216 Earl Garrett Street in Kerrville was added to the National Register of Historic Places in 1975 and designated a Recorded Texas Historic Landmark in 1962.

Captain Schreiner also had Giles design the A. C. Schreiner Jr. Home in 1879, located at 405 Water Street in Kerrville, as a gift to his son Charles A. Schreiner Jr. The home was inherited by grandson A. C. Schreiner Jr. in 1912. The home was designated a Recorded Texas Historic Landmark in 1981.

The 1890 Masonic Building built by Captain Schreiner at 211 Earl Garrett Street in Kerrville is attributed to Giles based on his contractual association with Schreiner. The Mason Building was added to the National Register of Historic Places in 1984. Giles also designed the 1882 Schreiner Store and the 1883 Schreiner Bank.

=== Nueces County ===
Giles was contracted to draw up plans for a new Cheston L. Heath School to be located at 900 Lipan in Corpus Christi, on land purchased by the Corpus Christi Independent School District in 1901

=== Travis County ===
Philanthropist Ira Hobart Evans purchased a house at 708 San Antonio Street in Austin in 1892, and hired Giles for a remodeling of the structure.

=== Other Texas structures ===
Circa 1881, Giles designed a $29,000 two-story bank building for Pat and Daniel Milmo on the corner of Lincoln and Salinas in Laredo in Webb County. The structure included a residence for Daniel Milmo.

== Monterrey, Mexico ==
Giles had a branch office in Monterrey, Mexico, in the first decade of the 20th century. His designs in Monterrey include Banco Mercantil (1901), La Reinera, and Arco de la Independencia (1910); in Chihuahua, the Palacio Municipal was constructed before 1908.

== Personal life and death ==
On December 15, 1881, Giles married Annie Laura James, daughter of Englishman John James, surveyor of Bexar County, Texas, and they had eight children.

Giles and his brother-in-law Judge John Herndon James became partners in the Hillingdon Ranch in Kendall County, near Comfort, around 1885. Funds from his English inheritance allowed him to purchase substantial land. The ranch, named for his English family home, came to total 13,000 acres. Giles became a founding member of the Texas Sheep and Goat Raisers' Association and a member of the Texas Cattle Raisers Association. The ranch operation hired $15 a month Kickapoo Indians as its labor force.

Giles died at Hillingdon Ranch on August 13, 1920, aged 67. He is buried next to his wife, who had died in 1909, in San Antonio City Cemetery No. 1.

== Associations ==
- Society of San Antonio Architects
- Texas State Association of Architects
