= Gray County Courthouse (Texas) =

- U.S. National Register of Historic Places
- Recorded Texas Historic Landmark
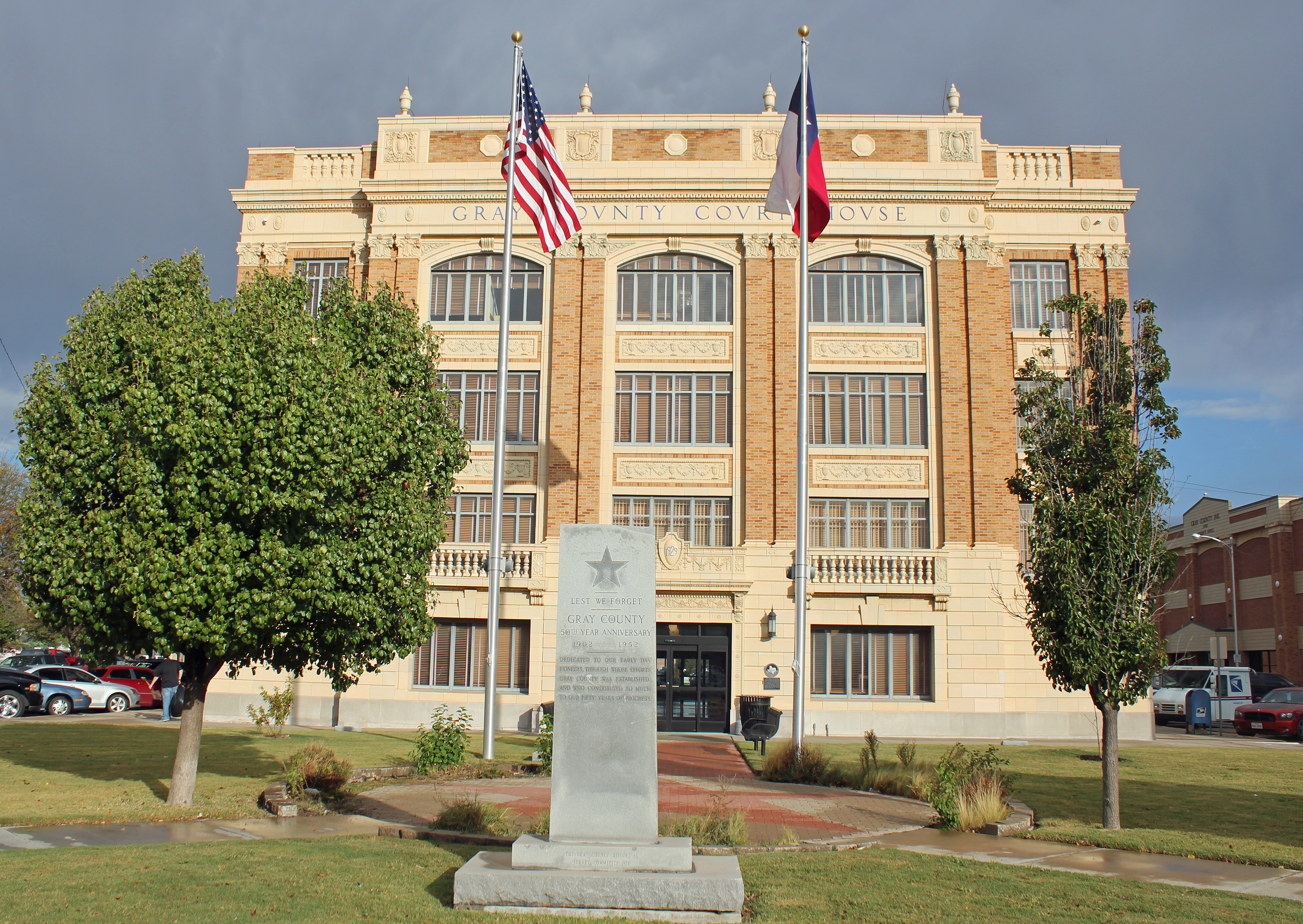
- Gray County Courthouse in 2015

- Location within Texas Location within the United States
- Interactive map showing the location of Gray County Courthouse
- Location: 205 N. Russell, Pampa, Texas
- Coordinates: 35°32′12″N 100°57′48″W
- Area: less than one acre
- Built: 1928-1929
- Built by: Harland L. Case
- Architect: W.R. Kaufman & Son
- Architectural style: Beaux-Arts
- NRHP reference No.: 98000142
- RTHL No.: 11902

Significant dates
- Added to NRHP: February 20, 1998
- Designated RTHL: 1997

The Gray County Courthouse in Pampa, Texas was built in 1929. It was listed on the National Register of Historic Places in 1998.

It was designed in Beaux-Arts style by architects W.R. Kaufman & Son, and was built by Harland L. Case.

== See also ==
- National Register of Historic Places listings in Gray County, Texas
- Recorded Texas Historic Landmarks in Gray County
- List of county courthouses in Texas
