= Webb County Courthouse (Texas) =

- U.S. National Register of Historic Places
- Texas State Antiquities Landmark
- Webb County Courthouse

- Location within Texas Location within the United States
- Location: 1000 Houston St., Laredo, Texas
- Coordinates: 27°30′26″N 99°30′20″W
- Area: 1 acre (0.40 ha)
- Built: 1909
- Architect: Alfred Giles, H. Sperbert
- Architectural style: Beaux-Arts
- NRHP reference No.: 81000635
- TSAL No.: 678

Significant dates
- Added to NRHP: May 4, 1981
- Designated TSAL: 5/15/1992

The Webb County Courthouse is located in Laredo in the U.S. state of Texas. It was added to the National Register of Historic Places in 1981.

== Design ==
In 1907, Webb County placed ads in local newspapers announcing a contest to design a new courthouse. Famed San Antonio architect Alfred Giles submitted the winning bid on February 27, 1907. The courthouse was completed in 1909 for $46,918.

The Beaux-Arts building features a curved judge's bench. A stained glass window features "Justice" holding the scales. Tile floors are in the Mediterranean style. Alamo Iron Works produced the wrought iron staircases. Interior doors are solid wood with brass knobs. Mansard roofed terminal pavilions feature stone-carved rams head accents. The building features yellow brick with dressings of white stone and red tile mansard roofs. The landscaping includes pecan trees and citrus trees. A cornerstone records the contractor, H. Sparbert, and architect, Alfred Giles, 1909. "254 Texas Courthouses".

Many of Alfred Giles' buildings have been demolished over the years. This example of his work shows why he continues to have the respect of architects, historians, and laymen alike.

In November 2010, the county held an art contest to commemorate the 100th anniversary of the courthouse. County Judge Danny Valdez and Javier Santos of the Fernando A. Salinas Charitable Trust Fund unveiled the winning design on November 12, 2010. The winning design was submitted by Jocelyn Rivera, and became a stained glass window on the third floor of the courthouse.

== Annex Building ==
The building, constructed in 1916, originally housed the Latin American Club until 1926. In 1926, the county acquired the building to house various offices and the 110th district court on the second floor in what was originally a ballroom.(see page 19) Eventually, the building became abandoned and decrepit.

The Webb County Courthouse Annex in 2014

In 2015, the county lost insurance for the building, and claims that the building was a public safety hazard fast-tracked the building's demolition.

== See also ==
- National Register of Historic Places listings in Webb County, Texas
- List of county courthouses in Texas
