= Live Oak County Courthouse =

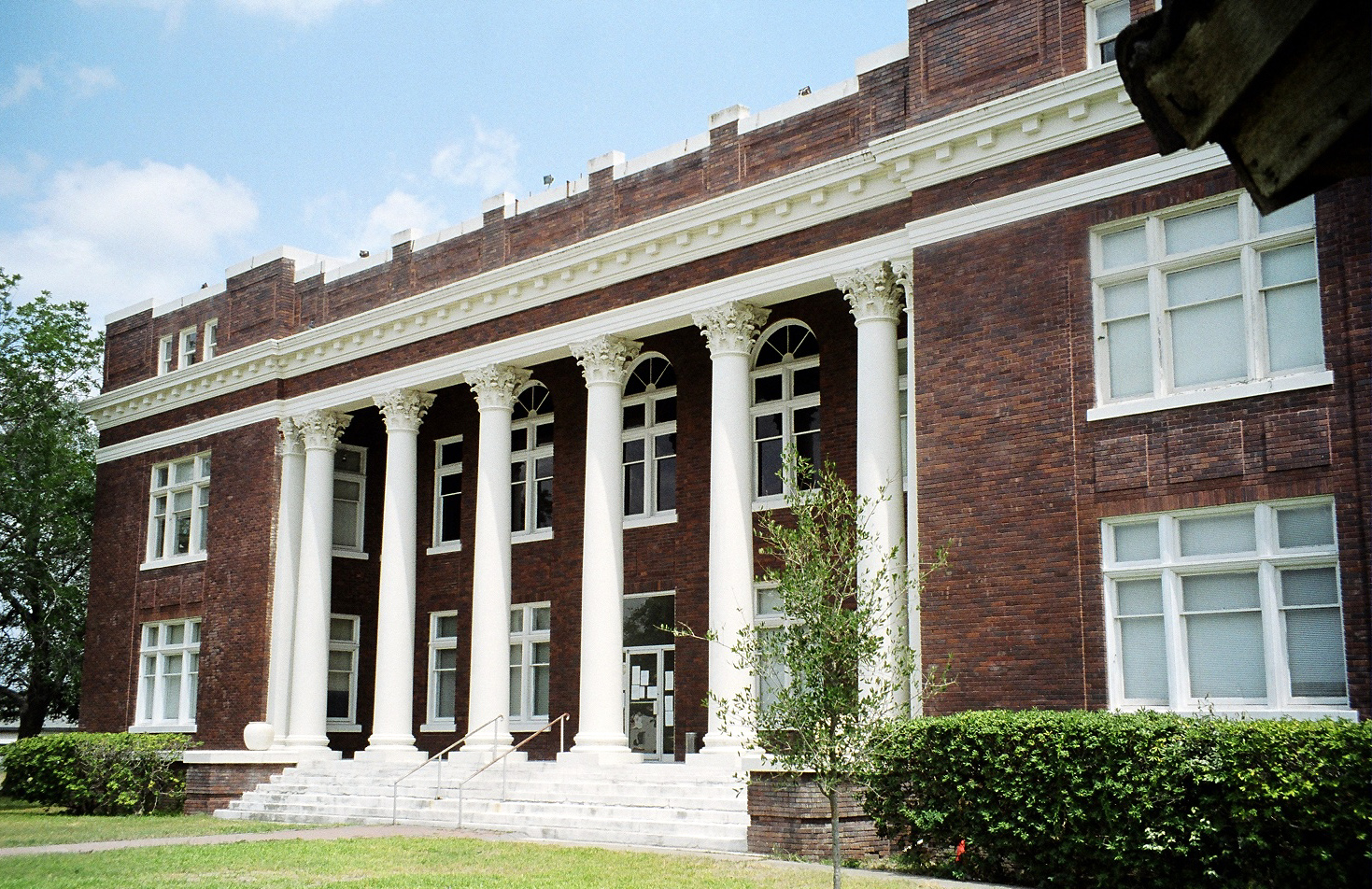
- Live Oak County Courthouse in George West

- Location within Texas Location within the United States
- Interactive map showing the location of Live Oak County Courthouse

General information
- Architectural style: Classical revival
- Location: George West
- Coordinates: 28°19′52″N 98°7′1″W
- Opened: 1919
- Owner: Live Oak County

Design and construction
- Architect: Alfred Giles

Live Oak County Courthouse is located in George West, Texas. It is the county's third courthouse. The courthouse grounds includes a war memorial.

== History ==
In 1857, a courthouse was built at the previous county seat of Oakville, Texas.

The first courthouse at the county seat of George West was built in 1888. The current courthouse in George West was designed by architect Alfred Giles in 1919 in the Classical revival style. This is the last courthouse Giles designed. A town square three blocks from the railroad depot was planned in 1914 for the construction of the courthouse. In 1956, Wyatt C. Hedrick designed an annex in the modern vernacular.

The courthouse grounds holds a state historical marker denoting the Veterans of Foreign Wars and American Legion, in honor of the men and women who served their country in the armed forces.

== See also ==
- List of county courthouses in Texas
