= Presidio County Courthouse =

- U.S. National Register of Historic Places
- Texas State Antiquities Landmark
- Recorded Texas Historic Landmark
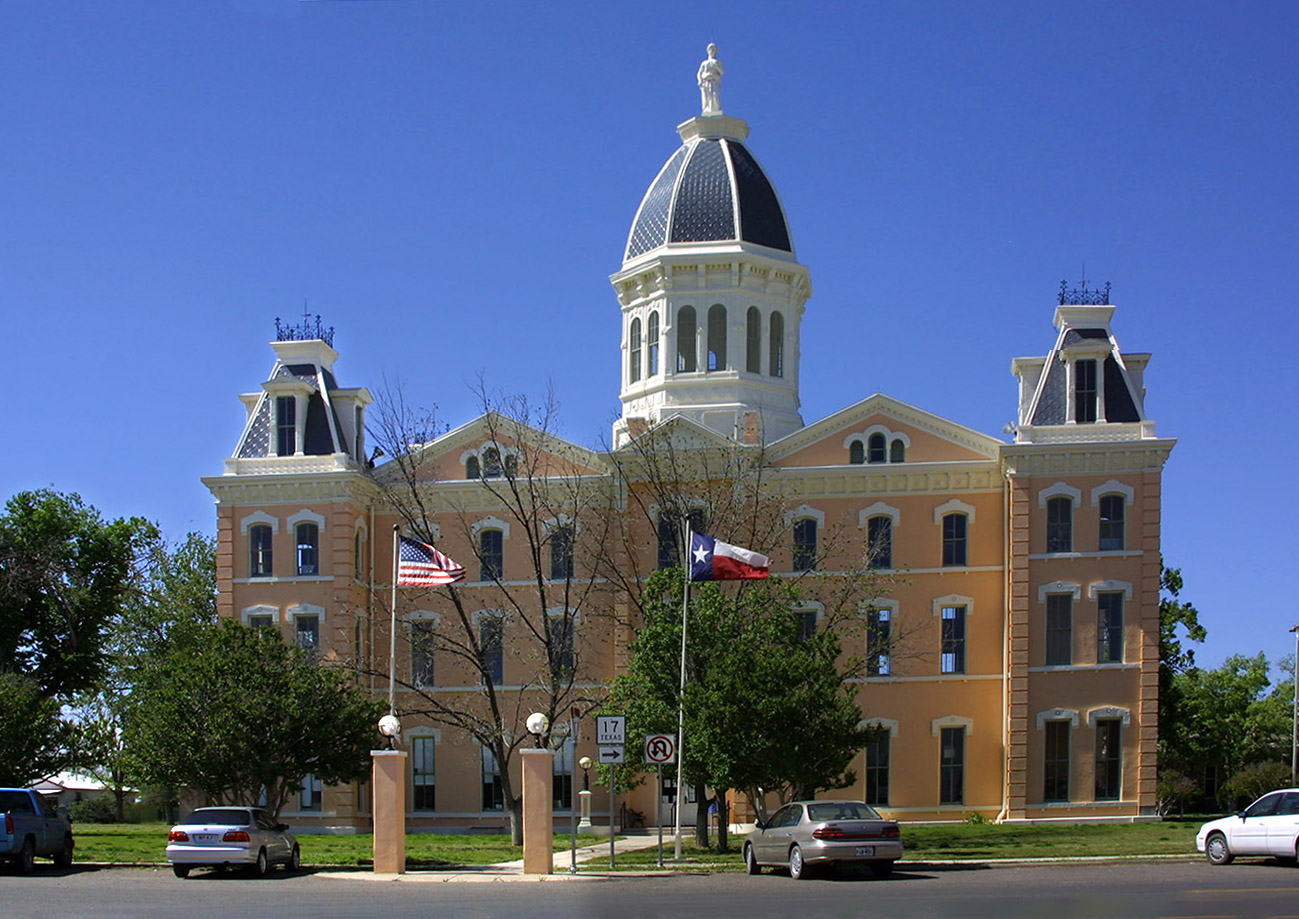
- Presidio County Courthouse

- Location within Texas Location within the United States
- Interactive map showing the location of Presidio County Courthouse
- Location: Public Sq., Marfa, Texas
- Coordinates: 30°18′48″N 104°1′20″W
- Area: 2 acres (0.81 ha)
- Built: 1886
- Architect: Alfred Giles
- Architectural style: Second Empire, Italianate
- NRHP reference No.: 77001467
- TSAL No.: 8200000531
- RTHL No.: 4117

Significant dates
- Added to NRHP: December 20, 1977
- Designated TSAL: May 28, 1981
- Designated RTHL: 1964

The Presidio County Courthouse is located in Marfa, Presidio County in the U.S. state of Texas. It was added to the National Register of Historic Places in 1977. It was designated a Recorded Texas Historic Landmark in 1964.

== Description ==
San Antonio architect Alfred Giles beat out eighteen other competitors to submit the winning bid on designing the 1886 courthouse at a cost of $60,000. Giles modeled the Second Empire style building after the El Paso courthouse he also designed in 1886. When the structure was completed, the county held a celebratory grand ball on January 1, 1887.

The courthouse can be seen from almost any location in Marfa. Designed of brick and stone quarried in Marfa, the exterior is of pink stucco with Lady Justice sitting atop the central dome. The tower is spanned by Roman arches. Interiors are designed of pecan wood. Dormers extend over the roof, with triangular pediments and iron cresting. The building has entrances on all sides, meeting in a central rotunda. When designed, the district courtroom took up the entire east side of the second floor. The grand jury room was on the third floor. A remodeling took place in 2001.

== History ==
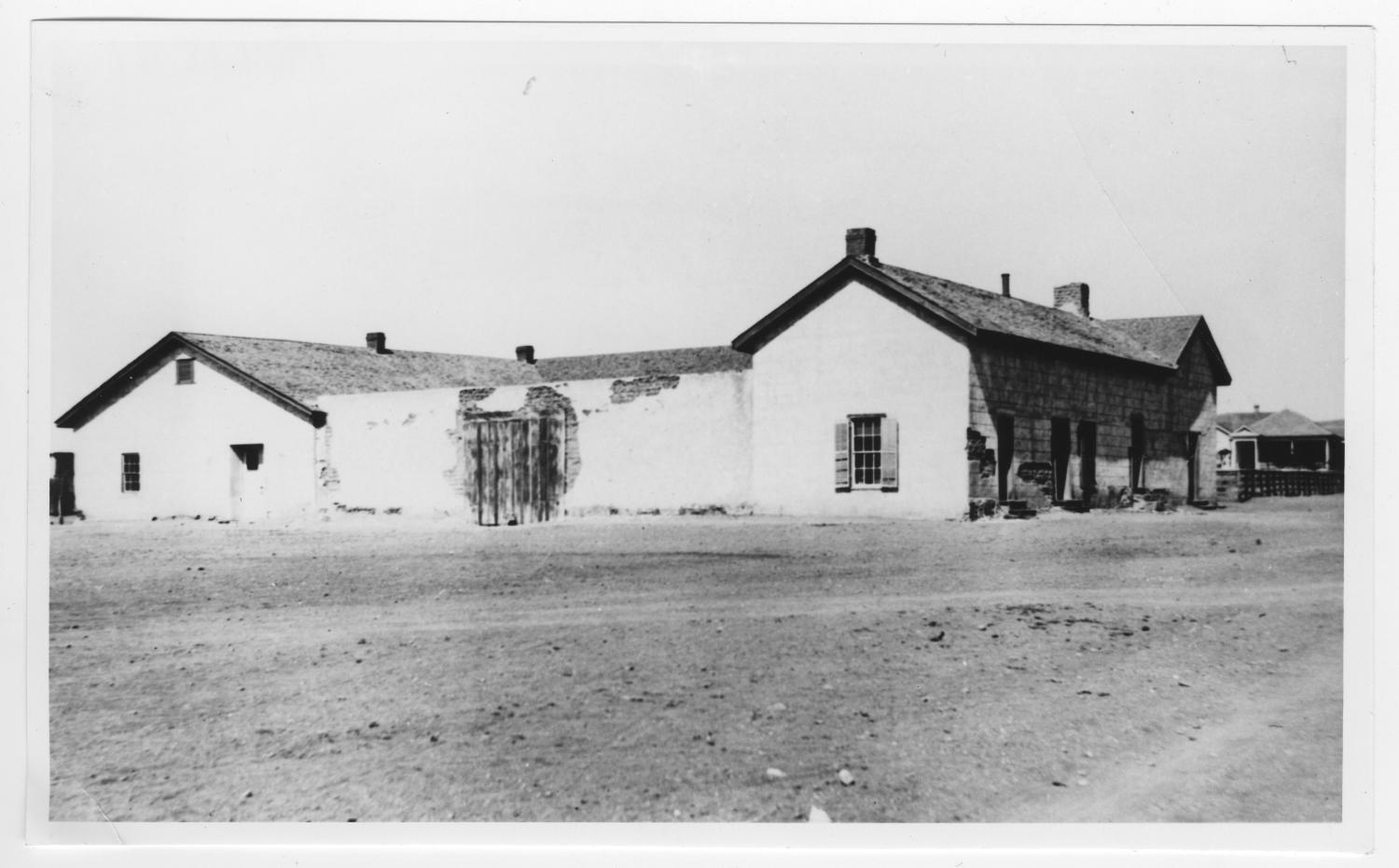
Original Presidio County Courthouse in Fort Davis; the handwritten description on the back of the photo may be viewed here

The courthouse was preceded by a facility, no longer extant, in Fort Davis from 1880 to 1885 when the county seat was relocated from Fort Davis to Marfa.

== See also ==
- National Register of Historic Places listings in Presidio County, Texas
- Recorded Texas Historic Landmarks in Presidio County
- List of county courthouses in Texas
