= Brooks County Courthouse (Texas) =

- U.S. National Register of Historic Places
- Recorded Texas Historic Landmark
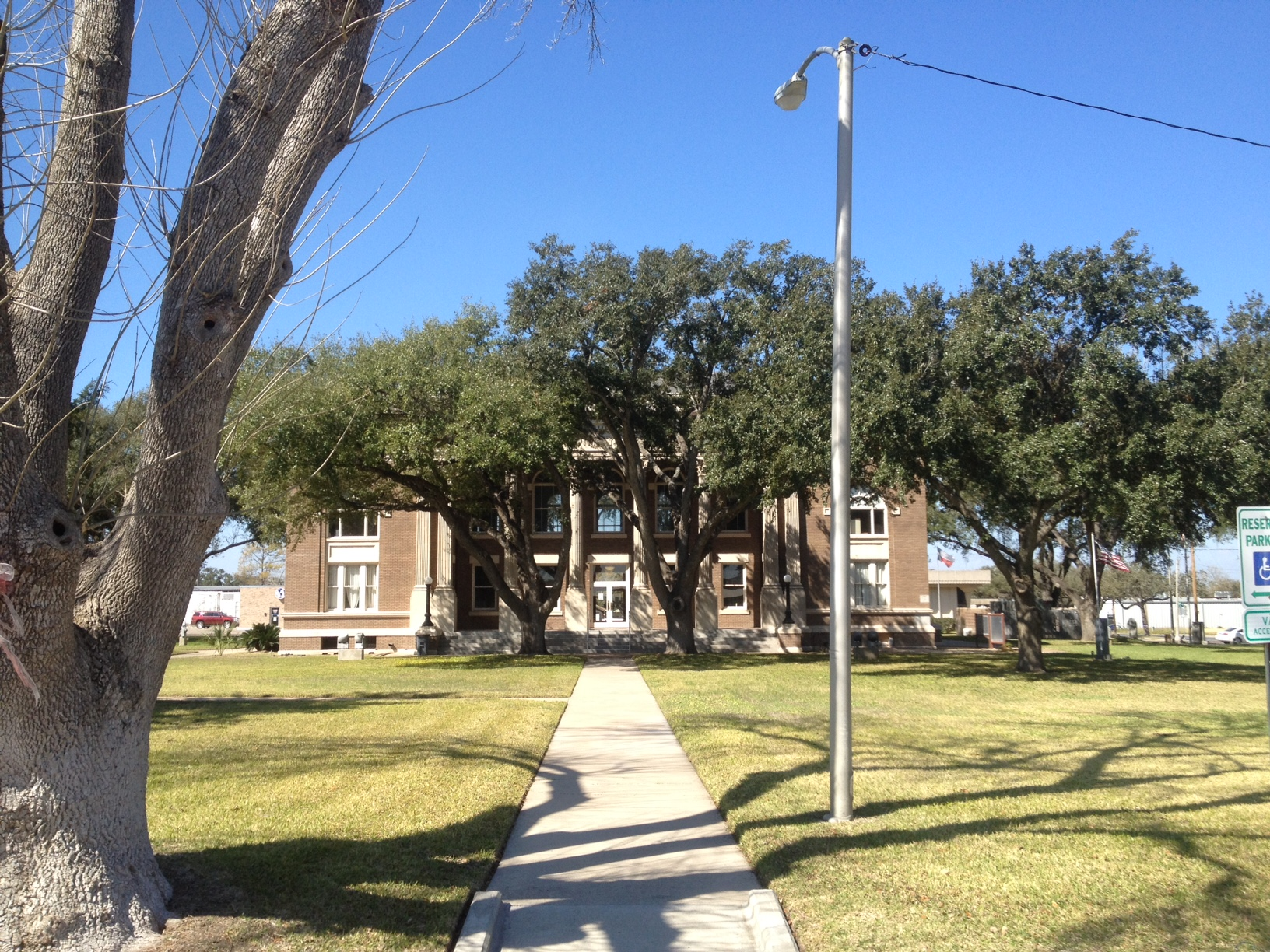
- Brooks County Courthouse

- Location within Texas Location within the United States
- Location: 100 E. Miller St., Falfurrias, Texas
- Coordinates: 27°13′32″N 98°8′38″W
- Area: 2.4 acres (0.97 ha)
- Built: 1914
- Built by: Westlake & Mizell
- Architect: Alfred Giles
- Architectural style: Classical Revival
- NRHP reference No.: 12000193
- RTHL No.: 523

Significant dates
- Added to NRHP: April 10, 2012
- Designated RTHL: 1977

Brooks County Courthouse is located in Falfurrias, in the U.S. state of Texas. The structure was designed by Alfred Giles in 1914 in the Classic revival style. Prior to the erection of the brick county courthouse, local government housed itself in rented space. The courthouse was named a Recorded Texas Historic Landmark in 1977. Renovation began on the courthouse in 2006.

== First attempt to build a courthouse ==
After Brooks County was formed from Starr County in 1911, officials met first in a hall, and later in a two-story building in downtown Falfurrias.

The county commissioners court set a November, 1912, date for holding a bond election for a courthouse and new roads. Although the bonds passed 344 to 9, the Texas attorney general failed to approve the bond issue, in part because precinct 4 voters were actively seeking to separate from Brooks County. Brooks County voters would not vote on the issue again until after their reorganization—after the legislature allowed precinct 4 voters to separate and create Jim Hogg County. San Antonio architect Atlee B. Ayres was to design the structure.

== The 1914 courthouse ==
Brooks County voters voted again on the bond issue in February 1914, and it passed. Noted Texas architect Alfred Giles was selected to design the courthouse. He was actively involved in three other courthouse projects in the region at the time, Cameron County, Jim Wells, and Kleberg Counties.

Judge James A. Brooks, who had been a state representative instrumental in helping Brooks County separate from Starr County, was honored at the structure's opening ceremonies. Opening day was celebrated with a public picnic and a parade led by the local high school band.

Brooks County was named after Judge Brooks, who was also a captain in the Texas Rangers.

The courthouse was added to the National Register of Historic Places on April 10, 2012.

== See also ==
- National Register of Historic Places listings in Brooks County, Texas
- Recorded Texas Historic Landmarks in Brooks County
