= Cameron County Courthouse =

Cameron County Courthouse may refer to:

- Cameron County Courthouse (1882) in Brownsville, Texas
- Cameron County Courthouse (1914) in Brownsville, Texas
- Cameron County Courthouse (1980), as covered in List of county courthouses in Texas
- Cameron County Courthouse (Pennsylvania) in Emporium, Pennsylvania
