= Southwest Tower Building =

Building in Austin Texas

Coordinates: 30.2683°N 97.7408°W

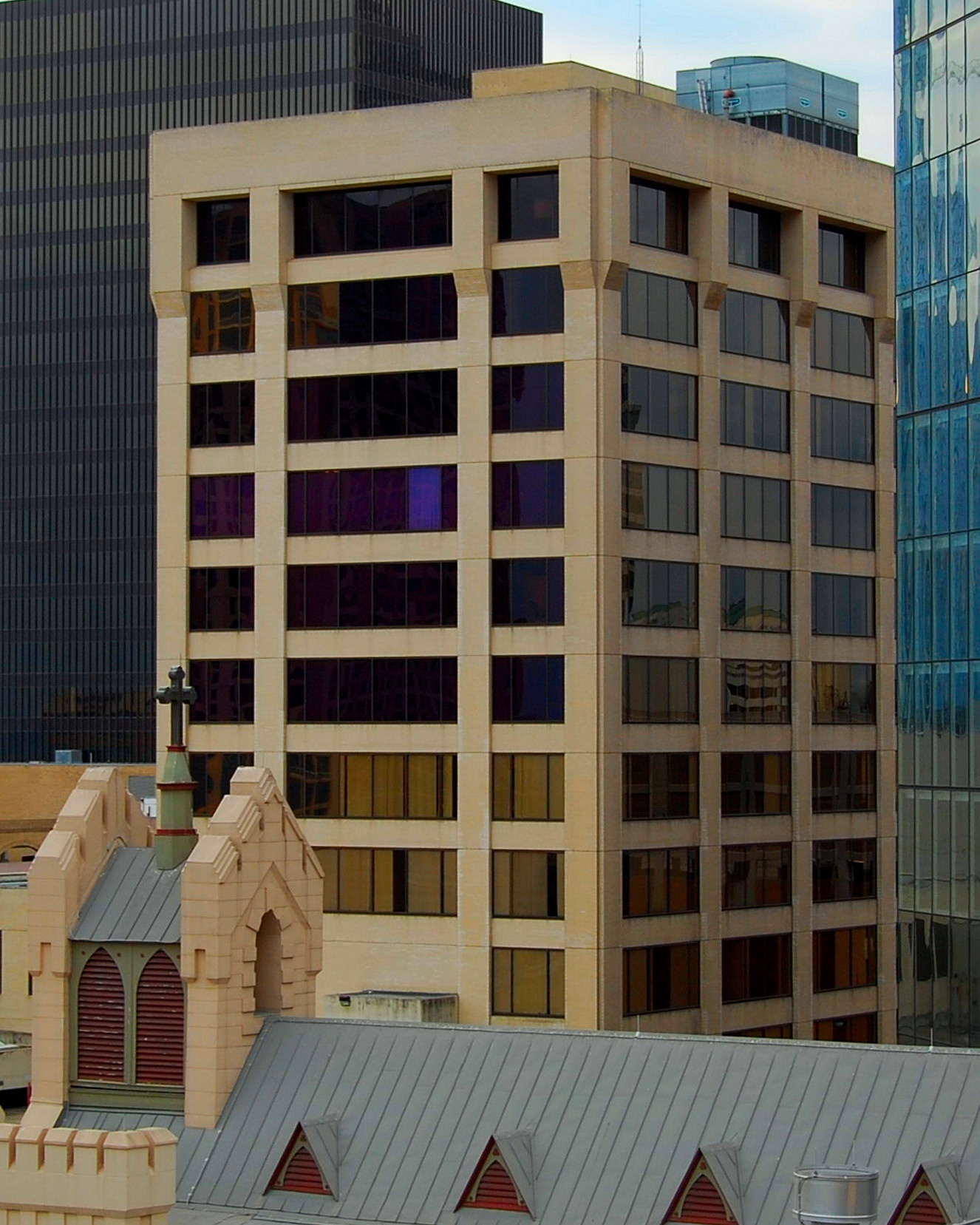

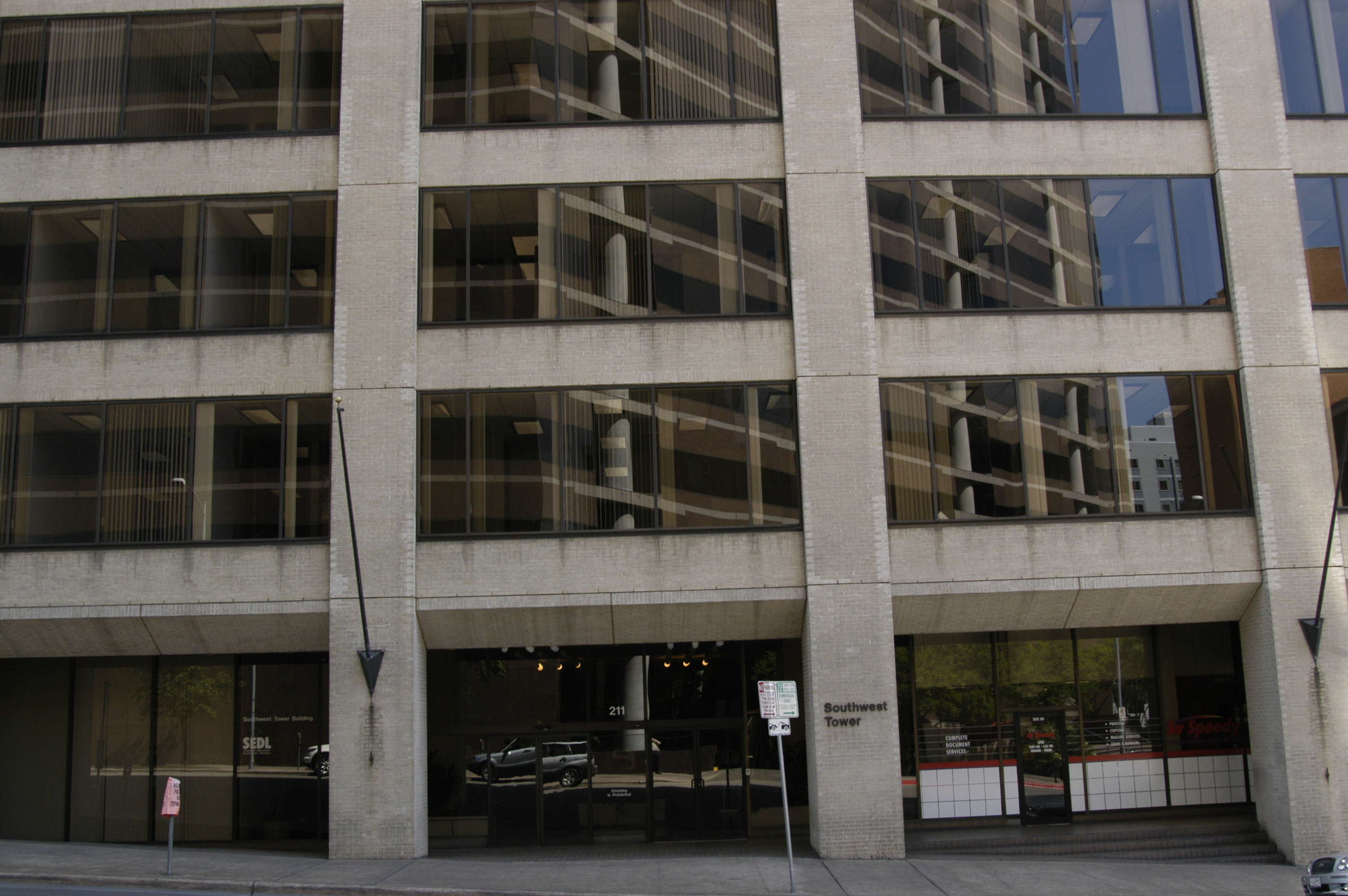

The Southwest Tower Building is a 12-story, 160,410-square-foot (14,903 m^{2}) building at 211 East 7th St. in Downtown Austin, Texas and is located across the street from the historic Driskill Hotel and the modern Omni Hotel. On the edge of the E. 6th Street entertainment district and Congress Avenue, the Southwest Tower building is within easy walking distance to the numerous restaurants and entertainment venues in the downtown area. The building has also earned the moniker of "Telemarketing Tower" for the large number of telemarketing operations that have been based inside it over the years ranging from the Republican Party of Texas phone center to Sears Vinyl Siding.

When it opened in 1972 it was considered the leading business tower in the city. (Austin American-Statesman November 18, 1972)

The Southwest Tower Building was the site of a fire on Sunday, March 6, 2011. No cause has been given for the fire.
