= Robertson County Courthouse and Jail =

- U.S. National Register of Historic Places
- Recorded Texas Historic Landmark
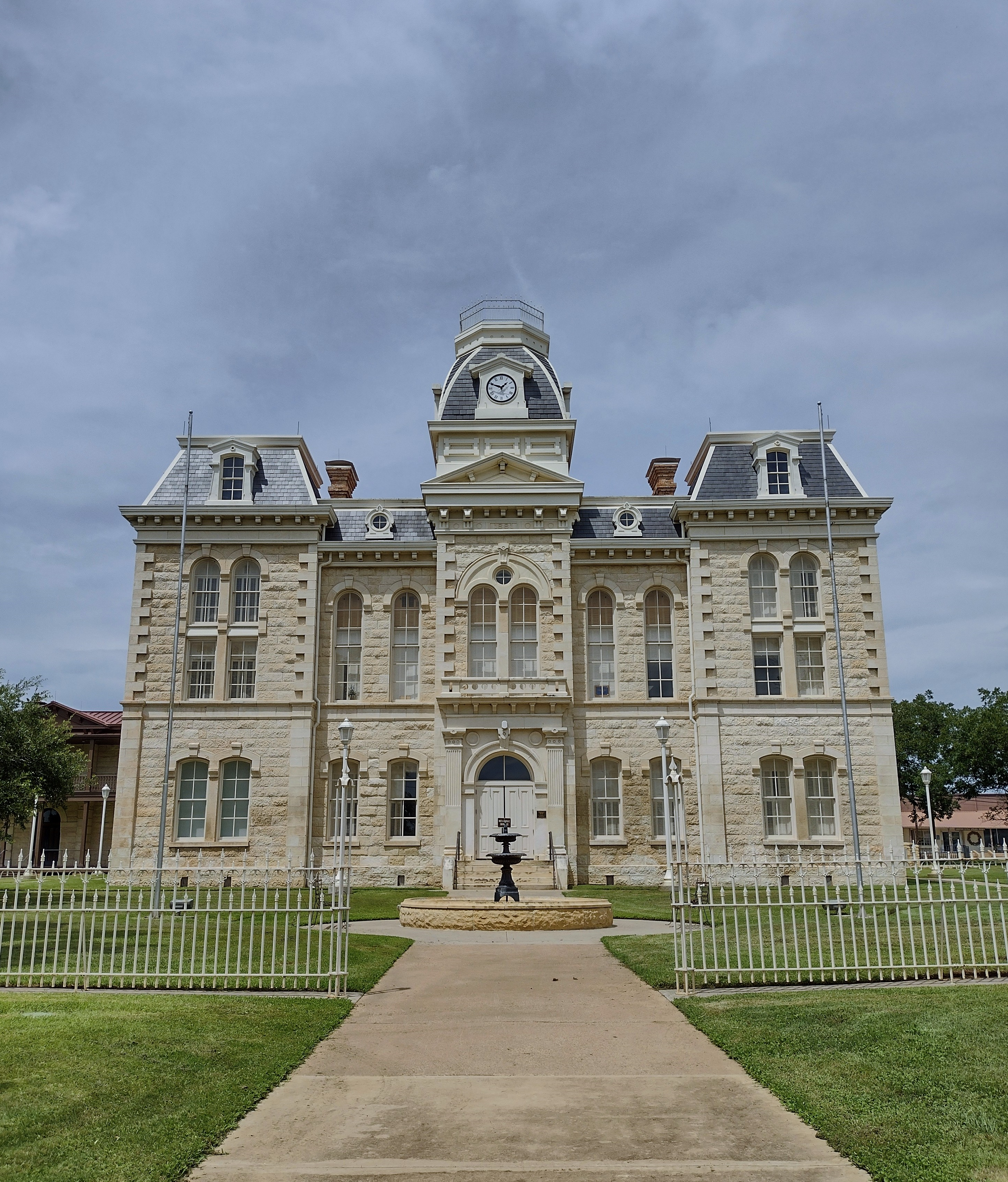
- Robertson County Courthouse in 2022

- Location within Texas Location within the United States
- Location: 102 W. Decherd St., Franklin, Texas
- Coordinates: 31°01′36″N 96°29′13″W
- Area: 3 acres (1.2 ha)
- Built: 1879 (Jail); 1882 (Courthouse)
- Architect: Frederick Ernst Ruffini
- Architectural style: Second Empire, Classic Texas Plan
- NRHP reference No.: 77001472
- RTHL No.: 10943

Significant dates
- Added to NRHP: December 22, 1977
- Designated RTHL: 1968

The Robertson County Courthouse and Jail in Franklin, Texas, serves as the county courthouse for Robertson County. The jail was constructed in 1879 and the courthouse was completed in 1880. It was designed by Frederick Ernst Ruffini and built in the Second Empire. Its signature mansard roof was removed in 1924 but was restored in the 2010s. It was listed as a Recorded Texas Historic Landmark in 1968 and on the National Register of Historic Places in 1977.

== History ==
After Robertson County's organization in 1838, the county seat moved several times. Planning for the new courthouse-jail complex in Franklin began after the 1879 general election concluded the county seat would move there from Calvert. As planned by Austin architect Frederick Ernst Ruffini, the site was to be on the main public square. The jail was constructed by James P. Smith in 1879 for a cost of $11,485. Construction on the courthouse was approved in 1881 and completed in 1882 at a total cost of $30,000.

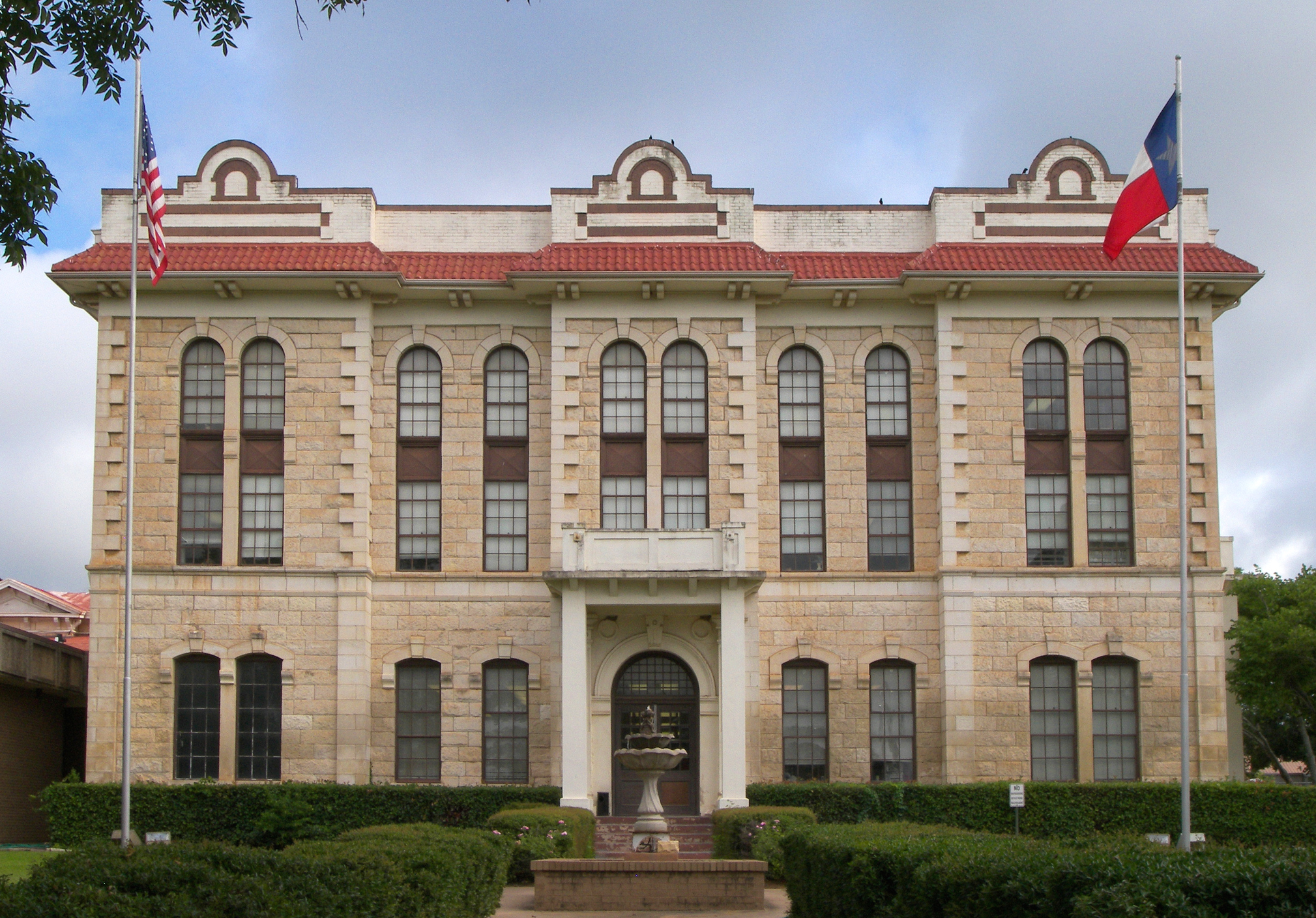
The courthouse before remodeling, 2010

In 1924, remodeling works were carried out by Hix McCanless. The original mansard roof was removed in favor of modernizing the building with a flat, Mission-type facade. This new roof consisted of a parapet separated from the original walls by an overhanging roof supported by brackets.

Additional remodeling works occurred in 1973 as part of a $500,000 plan to repair and restore several features. The interior was completely gutted and windows were repaned. The roof was also renovated and lowered. Another annex building was added for more office space.

In 2014, more major remodels were completed, which reintroduced several original features that had been lost over the decades. The Mission-style parapet and awnings were removed entirely, and the roof as initially installed in 1882 was rebuilt. Modern steel windows were replaced with wooden frames. Inside, two original wooden staircases were reconstructed. Lindale-based architectural firm Mark A. Thatcher, AIA led the restoration, and J.E. Kingham Construction Company of Nacogdoches carried out construction.

== Architecture ==
The courthouse's rectangular footprint measures 81 ft 11 in (25.0 m) by 66 ft 5 in (20.2 m). Its exterior walls are made of Austin limestone. It was originally constructed in the Second Empire style. The roof—which was demolished in 1924 but restored in 2014—features corner pavilions and a central tower topped by mansard roofs inset with galvanized iron dormers. Clocks are set into the top of the tower.
