= J. N. Preston =

American architect (1832–1922)

- Born: October 5, 1832; Ira, New York
- Died: December 8, 1922 (aged 90); Union City, California
- Occupation: Architect
- Awards: Fellow, American Institute of Architects (1889)
- Practice: J. N. Preston; Preston & Ruffini; J. N. Preston & Son; Preston & Locke; Preston & MacKenzie; Preston & Marsh; Preston & Seehorn

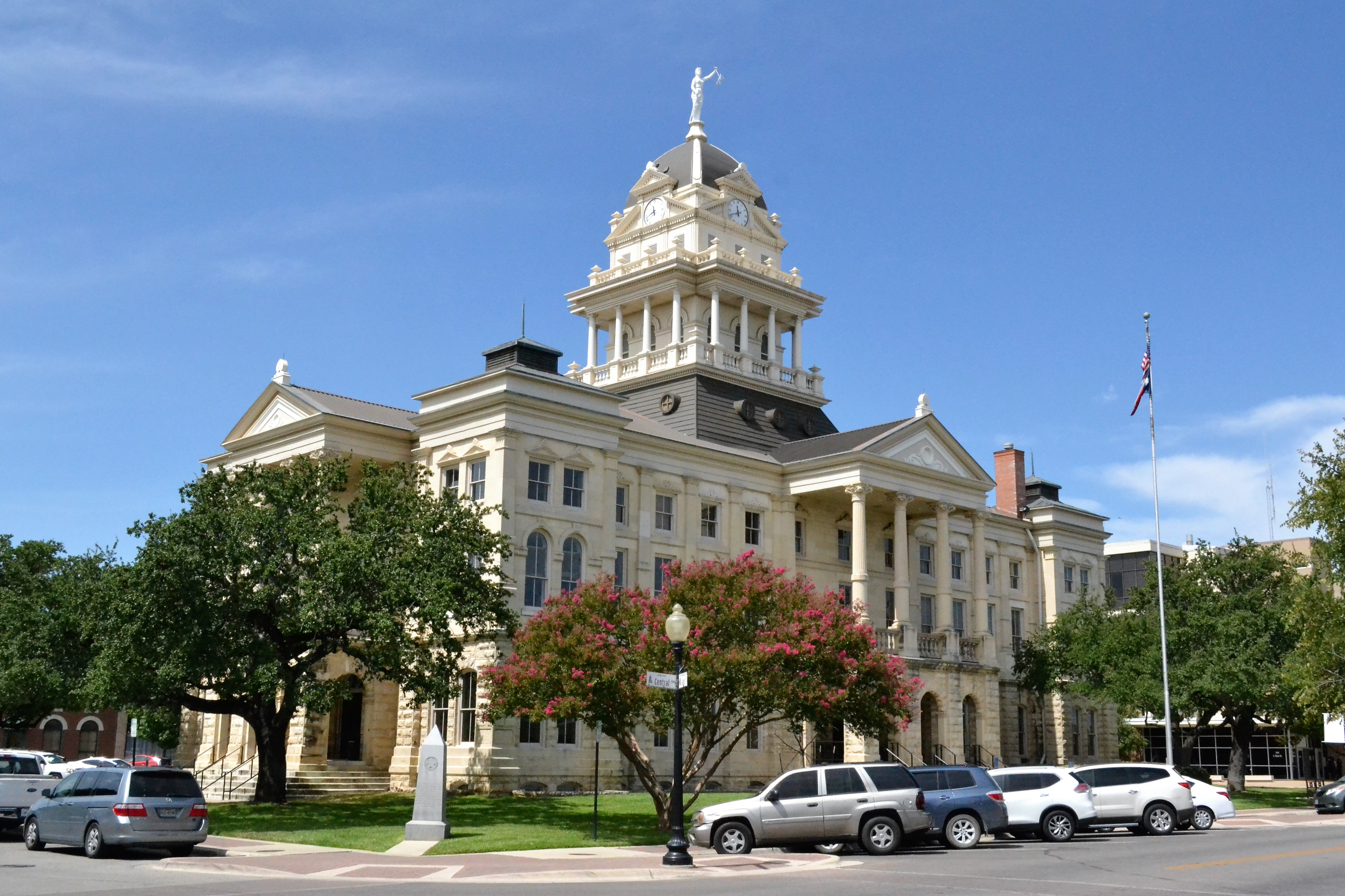
The Bell County Courthouse in Belton, designed by J. N. Preston & Son in the Italianate style and completed in 1885.

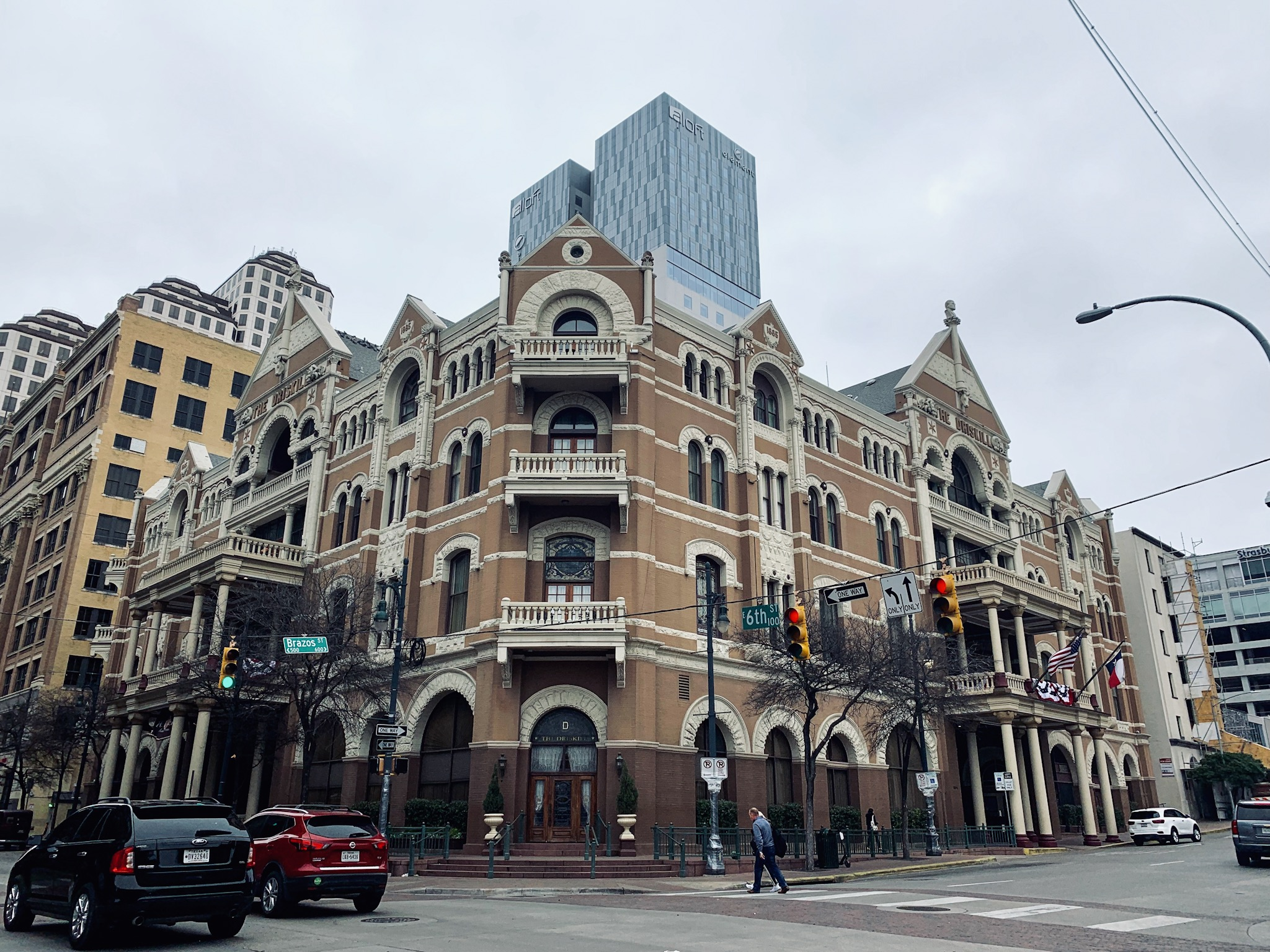
The Driskill Hotel in Austin, designed by J. N. Preston & Son in the Richardsonian Romanesque style and completed in 1886.

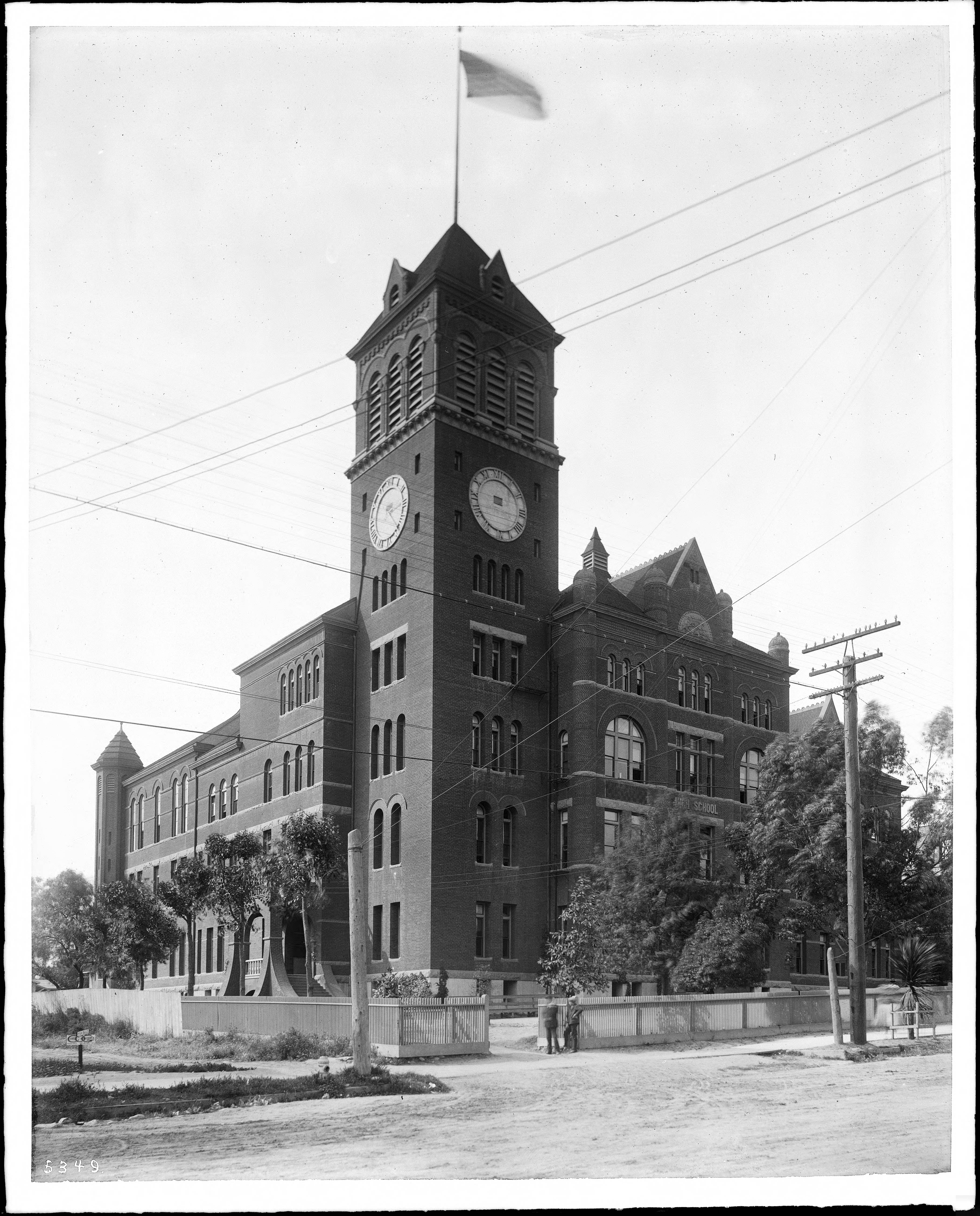
The second Los Angeles High School, designed by Preston in the Richardsonian Romanesque style and completed in 1890.

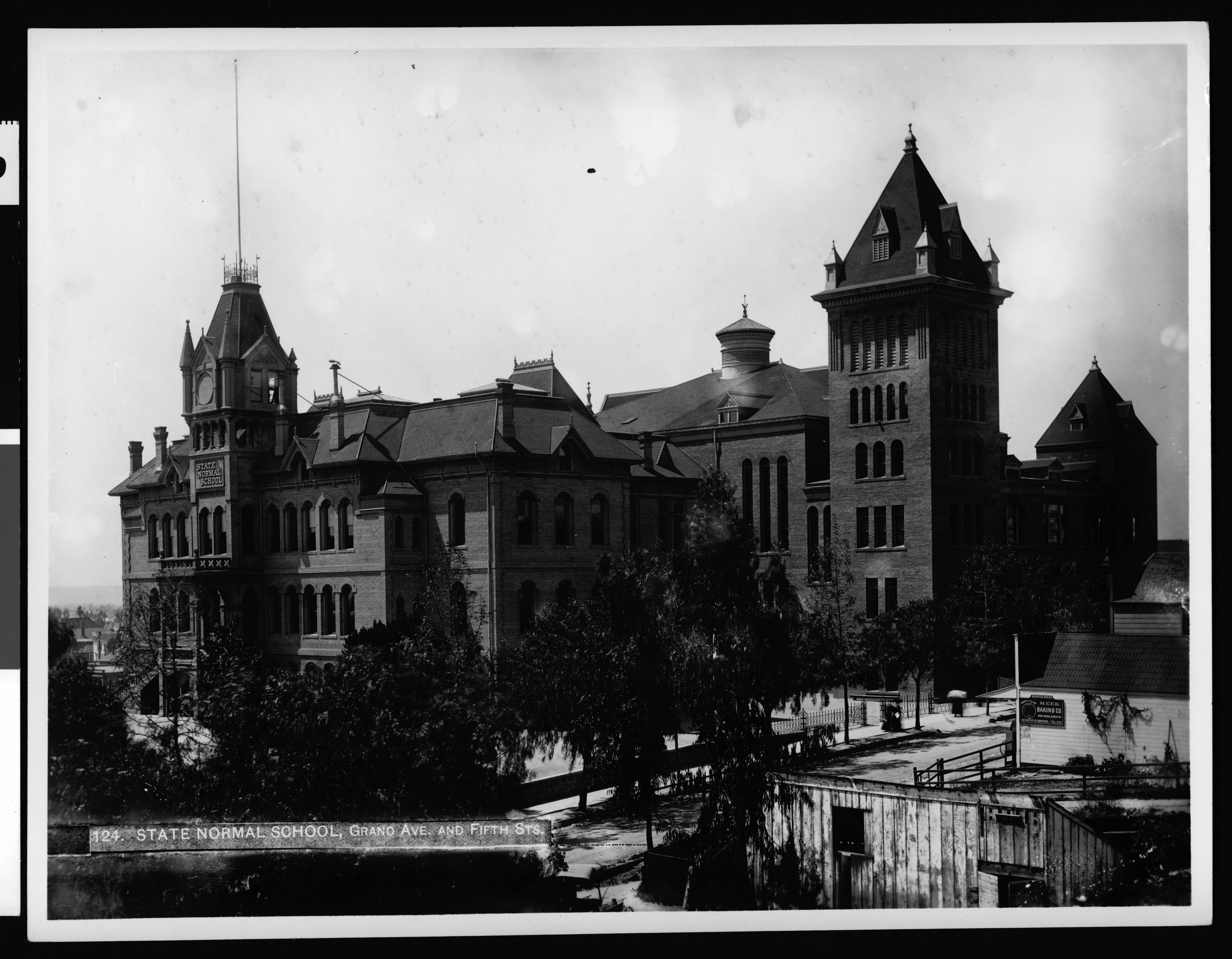
At right, the annex to the Los Angeles Normal School, designed by Preston & Locke in the Richardsonian Romanesque style and completed in 1894.

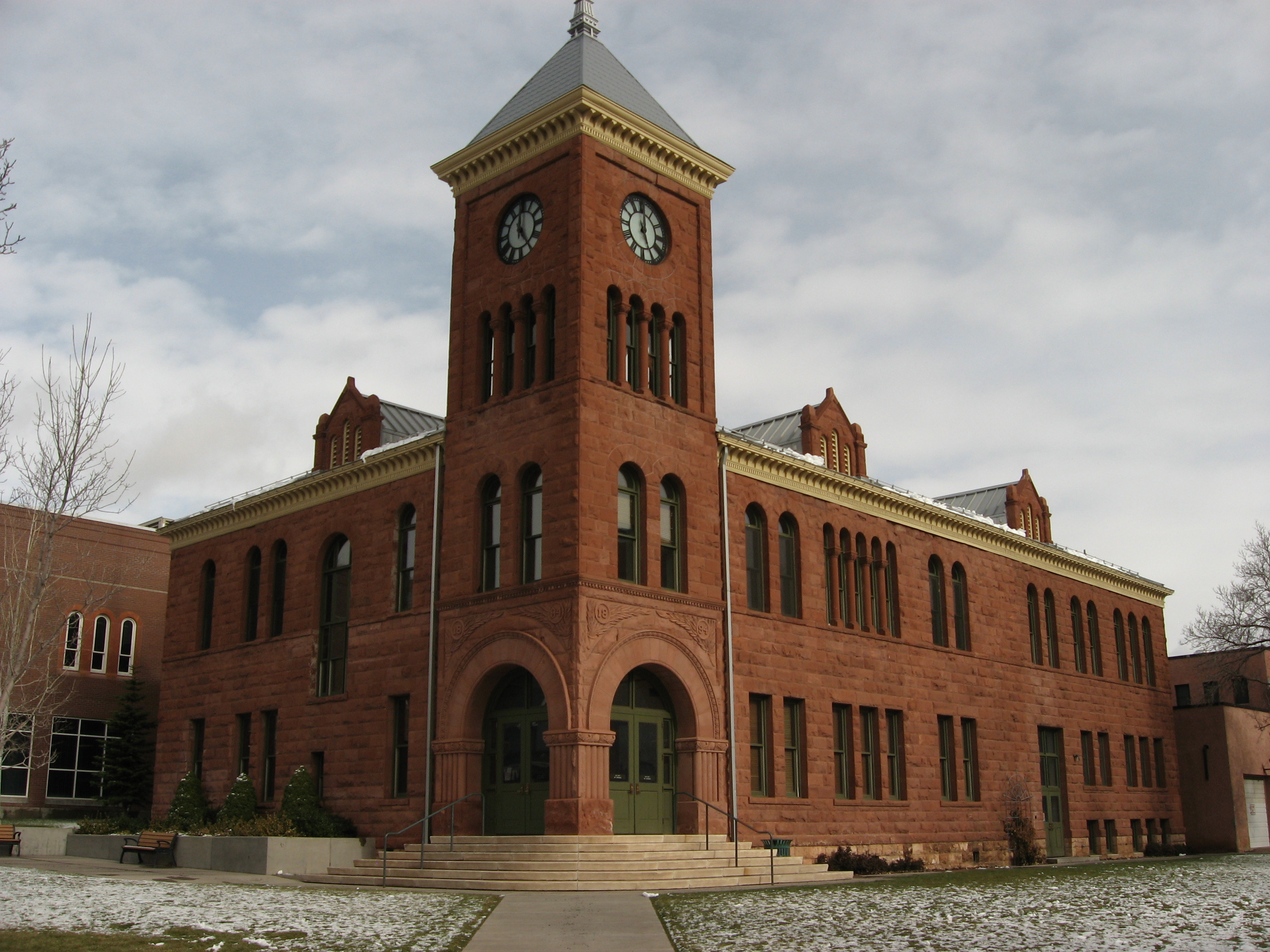
The former Coconino County Courthouse in Flagstaff, Arizona, designed by Preston in the Richardsonian Romanesque style and completed in 1895.

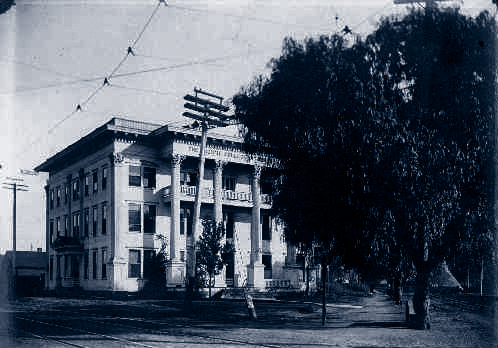
The former Pacific College of Osteopathy in Los Angeles, designed by Preston & Seehorn in the Beaux-Arts style and completed in 1904.

J. N. Preston FAIA (October 5, 1832 – December 8, 1922) was an American architect in practice in Austin, Texas and Los Angeles from 1875 until his retirement in 1907. During his lifetime he was one of the leading architects in Texas, and was responsible for major buildings in both states, including the Driskill Hotel in Austin, several Texas county courthouses and the second Los Angeles High School.

== Life and career ==
Jasper Newton Preston, known by his initials, was born October 5, 1832, in Ira, New York, to Samuel Preston, a farmer, and Rebecca Preston, née Sprague. In the winter of 1834–35 the family moved to Michigan, settling first in Lenawee County before settling permanently in Oneida Charter Township in Eaton County, near Lansing, in 1837. He was educated in the public schools and trained as a carpenter. After his marriage in 1857 he worked as a carpenter in Lansing and Grand Ledge, the largest community in the township. He first referred to himself as an architect in 1875, the same year he relocated to Austin.

In 1877 Preston formed the first of several partnerships, Preston & Ruffini, with Frederick Ernst Ruffini. This firm was responsible for the Williamson County Courthouse (1879) in Georgetown and was dissolved in 1878 over Ruffini's charges of unprofessional conduct against Preston. In November 1880, Preston was selected as supervising architect for the new Texas State Capitol. In April 1881, during the architect selection process for that building, Ruffini's allegations against Preston first became public, with Ruffini and a Mr. Loving, contractor for the Williamson County project, charging that Loving had paid a large bribe to Preston to obtain the contract. This forced Preston to resign as supervising architect. Nonetheless, he continued to be the city's leading architect.

In 1883 Preston formed the partnership of J. N. Preston & Son with his son, S. A. J. Preston, who had been educated in architecture as a special student at the Massachusetts Institute of Technology. They were responsible for the Driskill Hotel (1886) in Austin but relocated to Los Angeles shortly before the building was completed. In Los Angeles they completed for the job to design the new Los Angeles County Courthouse, but lost to Curlett, Eisen & Cuthbertson. S. A. J. Preston died suddenly in 1889 at the age of 31, and the elder Preston continued alone. Circa 1890 he operated a second office in Tacoma, Washington, with August F. Heide under the name Preston & Heide.

In 1893 he formed the partnership of Preston & Locke with Seymour E. Locke. Their work included an annex (1894) to the Los Angeles Normal School. This partnership lasted only a year and Preston again worked alone until 1896, when he formed the partnership of Preston & MacKenzie with Don MacKenzie. This was dissolved before the year was out and he was alone again until 1900, when he formed another one-year partnership with Norman Foote Marsh. They were responsible for the house of Scott A. McKeown (1900) in Los Angeles. McKeown, the 23-year-old spendthrift heir of a Pennsylvania oilman and husband to a granddaughter of Peter Studebaker, lost the house almost immediately, and Preston and the general contractor, as lien holders, foreclosed on the property. It was not successfully sold until a year later. After dissolving the partnership with Marsh, Preston formed his fourth and last partnership, Preston & Seehorn, with Ira H. Seehorn. This firm was chiefly responsible for homes and other small projects. Preston retired from practice in 1907.

== Personal life ==
Preston was married in 1857 to Janet Johnston of Oneida. They had seven children, three of which lived to adulthood. Their eldest child, Samuel Adam Johnston Preston, was his father's business partner. Janet Preston died in 1911, and in 1912 Preston moved into the Masonic Home in Union City, where he died December 8, 1922, at the age of 90. He was buried in the Hollywood Forever Cemetery, along with his wife.

== Legacy ==
Preston was one of Texas' leading architects of the nineteenth century. His major extant works in Texas include the Bell County Courthouse (1885) in Belton and the Driskill Hotel (1886) in Austin. He had a similar stature in Los Angeles prior to the economic decline of the 1890s. Many of his California projects have not survived, but the Coconino County Courthouse (1895) in Flagstaff, Arizona is extant. During and after the decline of the 1890s major projects began to go to other architects, such as Morgan & Walls and John Parkinson. Preston's works were designed in the popular styles of the Victorian era, including the High Victorian Gothic, Second Empire and Richardsonian Romanesque styles.

His office did not live long after his retirement. Seehorn continued to practice only until 1911, when he joined the staff of the Los Angeles Railway, where he would work until his death in 1943.

Preston had an active role in the organization of the architectural profession in both Austin and Los Angeles. In 1885 he and his son joined the Western Association of Architects (WAA), and in 1886 they participated in the formation of a state society of architects, of which Preston was the first vice president. In 1889 the WAA merged with the American Institute of Architects (AIA), and Preston, like all members, was made a Fellow. In 1892 he was elected the first president of the short-lived Southern California Association of Architects. He severed his connection with the AIA in 1895, but when a Southern California chapter was formed in 1907 he rejoined as a chapter member, and was elected a life member in recognition of his long career.

Three of his works, all designed in partnership with his son, have been listed on the United States National Register of Historic Places.

== Architectural works ==
=== J. N. Preston, 1875–1877, 1878–1883, 1889–1893 and 1894–1900 ===
- 1876 – Hannig Building, (Note: A contributing resource to the Sixth Street Historic District, NRHP-listed in 1975.) 200 E 6th St, Austin, Texas
- 1876 – Tips Building, (Note: A contributing resource to the Congress Avenue Historic District, NRHP-listed in 1978.) 712 Congress Ave, Austin, Texas
- 1881 – Allen Hall, (Note: Demolished.) Huston–Tillotson University, Austin, Texas
- 1882 – Nolan County Courthouse, 100 E 3rd St, Sweetwater, Texas
- 1883 – Calvary Episcopal Church, (Note: A contributing resource to the Bastrop Commercial District, NRHP-listed in 1978.) 603 Spring St, Bastrop, Texas
- 1890 – Los Angeles High School, Los Angeles
- 1895 – Coconino County Courthouse, 200 N San Francisco St, Flagstaff, Arizona

=== Preston & Ruffini, 1877–1878 ===
- 1879 – Gregg County Courthouse, 101 E Methvin St, Longview, Texas
- 1879 – McCulloch County Courthouse, 199 County Courthouse Sq, Brady, Texas
- 1879 – Williamson County Courthouse, 710 S Main St, Georgetown, Texas

=== J. N. Preston & Son, 1882–1889 ===
- 1883 – Bastrop County Courthouse, (Note: NRHP-listed.) 804 Pecan St, Bastrop, Texas
- 1883 – Cameron County Courthouse (former), Brownsville, Texas
- 1883 – Taylor County Courthouse, 301 Oak St, Abilene, Texas
- 1884 – Washington County Courthouse, 100 E Main St, Brenham, Texas
- 1885 – Bell County Courthouse, 101 E Central Ave, Belton, Texas
- 1886 – Driskill Hotel, 604 Brazos St, Austin, Texas
- 1888 – Burdick Block, Spring and 2nd Sts, Los Angeles

=== Preston & Locke, 1893–1894 ===
- 1893 – Frank C. Bolt house, 395 S Grand Ave, Pasadena, California
- 1894 – Los Angeles Normal School annex, Los Angeles

=== Preston & Marsh, 1900–1901 ===
- 1900 – Scott A. McKeown house, 2316 S Figueroa St, Los Angeles

=== Preston & Seehorn, 1901–1907 ===
- 1904 – Pacific College of Osteopathy, (Note: Later merged with several other institutions and now incorporated into the University of California, Irvine School of Medicine. Demolished.) Mission Rd and Daly St, Los Angeles
- 1907 – Lew W. Irvine house, 3115 Brockton Ave, Riverside, California
