= Bell County Courthouse (Texas) =

- U.S. National Register of Historic Places
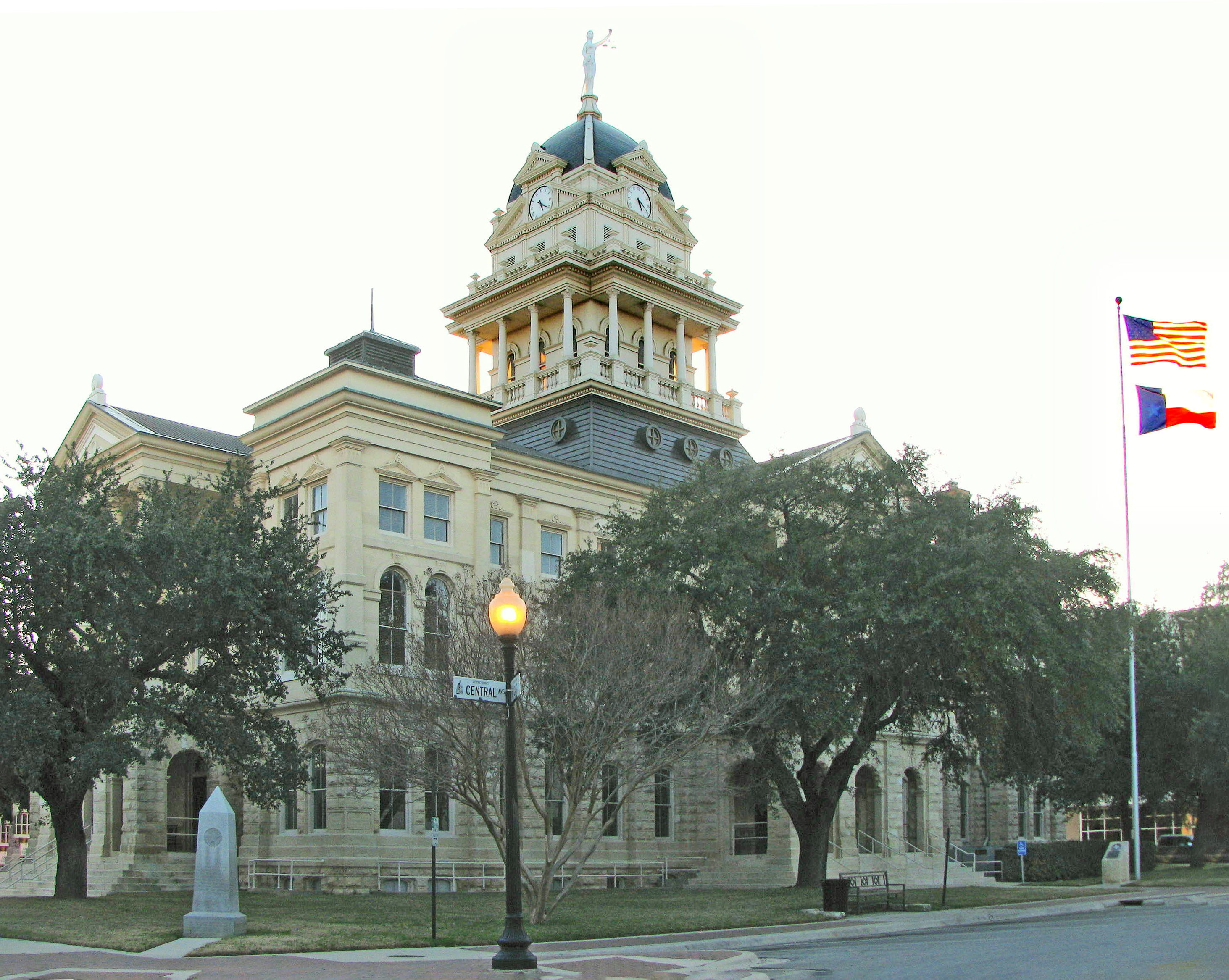

- Location within Texas Location within the United States
- Interactive map showing the location of Bell County Courthouse
- Location: Public Sq., Belton, Texas
- Coordinates: 31°03′21″N 97°27′48″W
- Area: 2 acres (0.81 ha)
- Built: 1884
- Built by: Ben D. Lee
- Architect: J. N. Preston & Son
- Architectural style: Renaissance
- NRHP reference No.: 76002004
- Added to NRHP: December 12, 1976

The Bell County Courthouse in Belton, Texas was built in 1884. It was listed on the National Register of Historic Places in 1976.

It is the third courthouse to serve Bell County. The structure was designed in the Renaissance Revival style by J. N. Preston & Son. It was added to the National Register of Historic Places in 1976, and partially restored in 1999.

It is a three-story building occupying its own block, with each side having an entrance pavilion including a portico of cut-stone columns with carved bases and capitals, and with each corner also having a projecting pavilion.

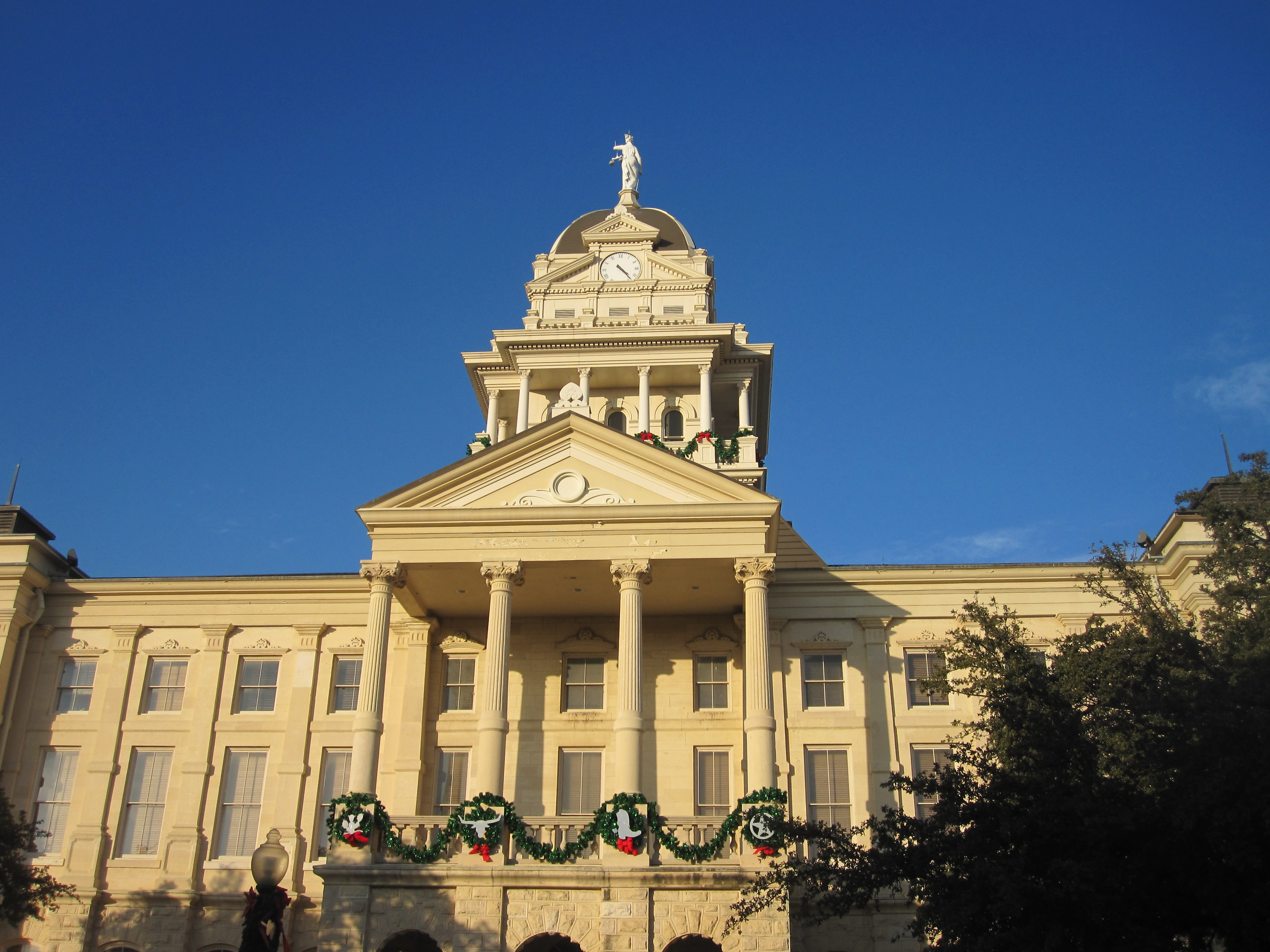
Courthouse in 2009, now again topped by a Goddess of Justice statue

It was built with a central 125 feet (38 m) tower topped by a statue of Goddess of Justice carrying sword and beam balance; the statue was later removed. The building also had detailing made of sheet metal by W.J. Burt and Company of Fort Worth which has also mostly been removed by 1976. That detailing, consisting of galvanized iron and spun zinc, included the roof covered by tin stamped to resemble slate, balustrades around each of the four porticos, and cornices and shell ornaments and window pediments.

It is located on Public Square in Belton. J.W. Preston & Son also designed the National Register-listed Bastrop County Courthouse and Jail Complex in Bastrop, Texas.

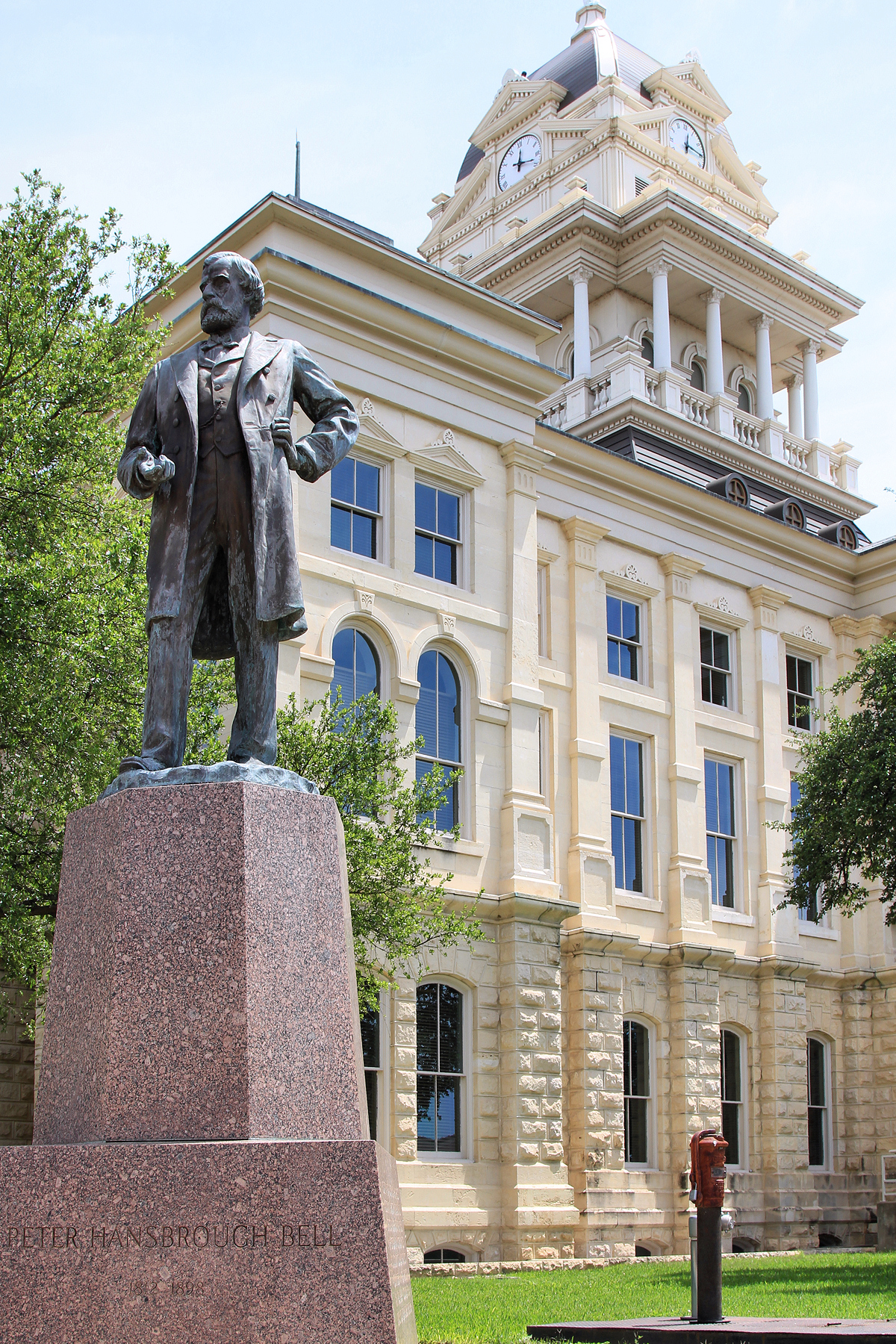
Peter H. Bell statue on grounds in 2018

== See also ==
- National Register of Historic Places listings in Bell County, Texas
