= Millett Opera House =

- U.S. National Register of Historic Places
- Recorded Texas Historic Landmark
- Texas State Antiquities Landmark
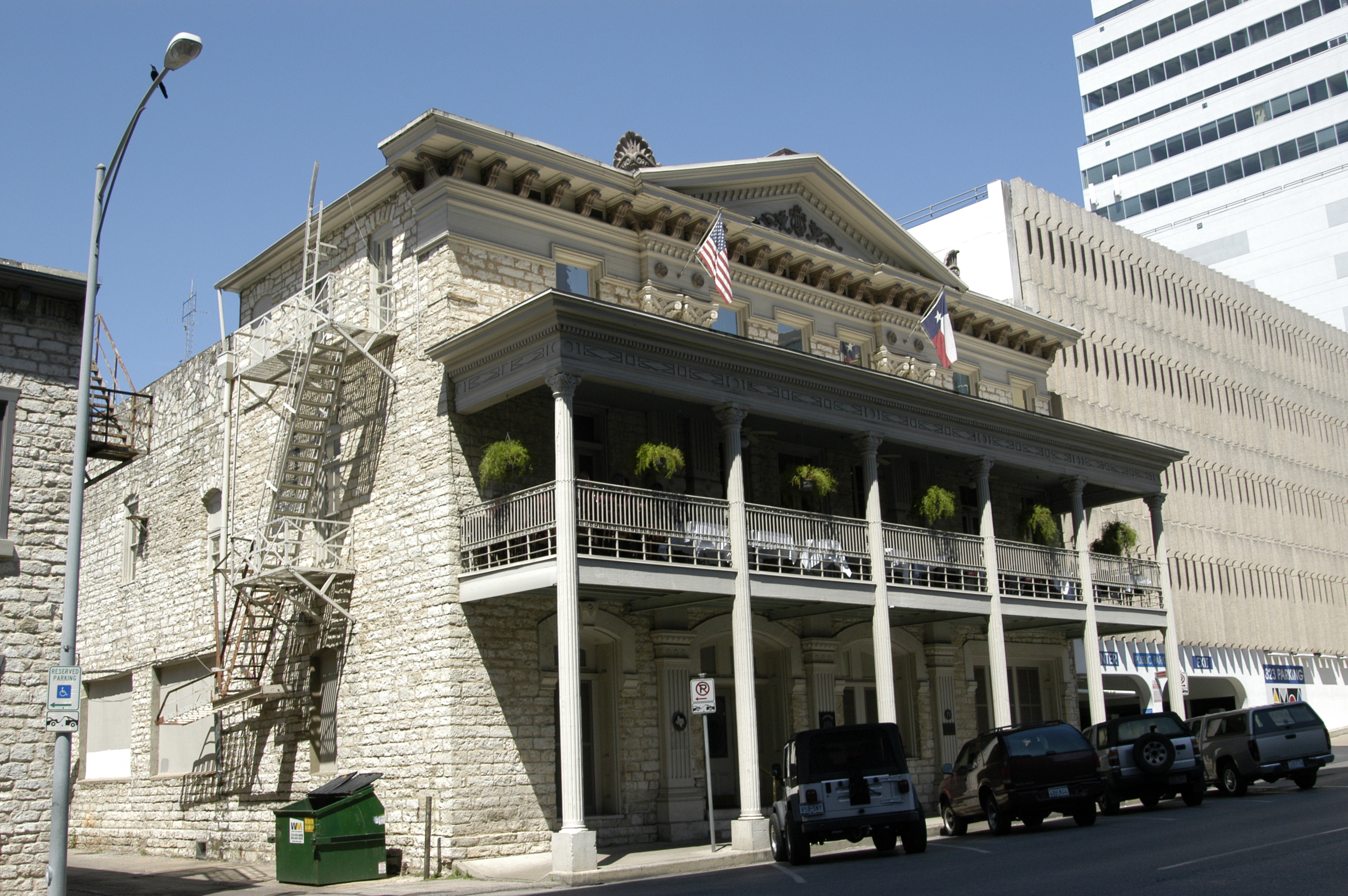
- Location: 110 E. 9th St., Austin, Texas
- Coordinates: 30°16′14″N 97°44′25″W
- Area: Less than 1 acre (0.40 ha)
- Built: 1878
- Architect: F.E. Ruffini
- NRHP reference No.: 78002991
- RTHL No.: 14910
- TSAL No.: 622

Significant dates
- Added to NRHP: March 21, 1978
- Designated RTHL: 1965
- Designated TSAL: 3/7/1984

The Millett Opera House, home of the Austin Club, is a historic building in downtown Austin, Texas. Built in 1878 by local lumber seller Charles Millett on one of his lots, the house was one of the largest performance spaces in Texas upon its completion. It featured 800 removable seats, 24-inch limestone walls, and the largest enclosed space in Texas. The Opera House was designed by Frederick Ruffini, an architect working throughout Texas.

The Austin Public Free Schools (today the Austin Independent School District) purchased the opera house in 1940. In the 1950s, it was threatened with demolition, but preserved by a local group of concerned people. It housed a printing company until 1979, when a long-term lease was arranged for the Austin Club, a local private social club. The Austin Club now owns the opera house.

The Austin Club renovated the building and divided it into three stories, removing the performance space, but a portion of the original hand-painted ceiling is still installed in one of the meeting rooms.

The building is located at 110 East Ninth Street. It was added to the National Register of Historic Places in 1978.

== Link ==
- National Register of Historic Places - Nomination Form

== See also ==
- National Register of Historic Places listings in Travis County, Texas
- Recorded Texas Historic Landmarks in Travis County
