= Bastrop County Courthouse and Jail Complex =

- U.S. National Register of Historic Places
- Texas State Antiquities Landmark
- Recorded Texas Historic Landmarks
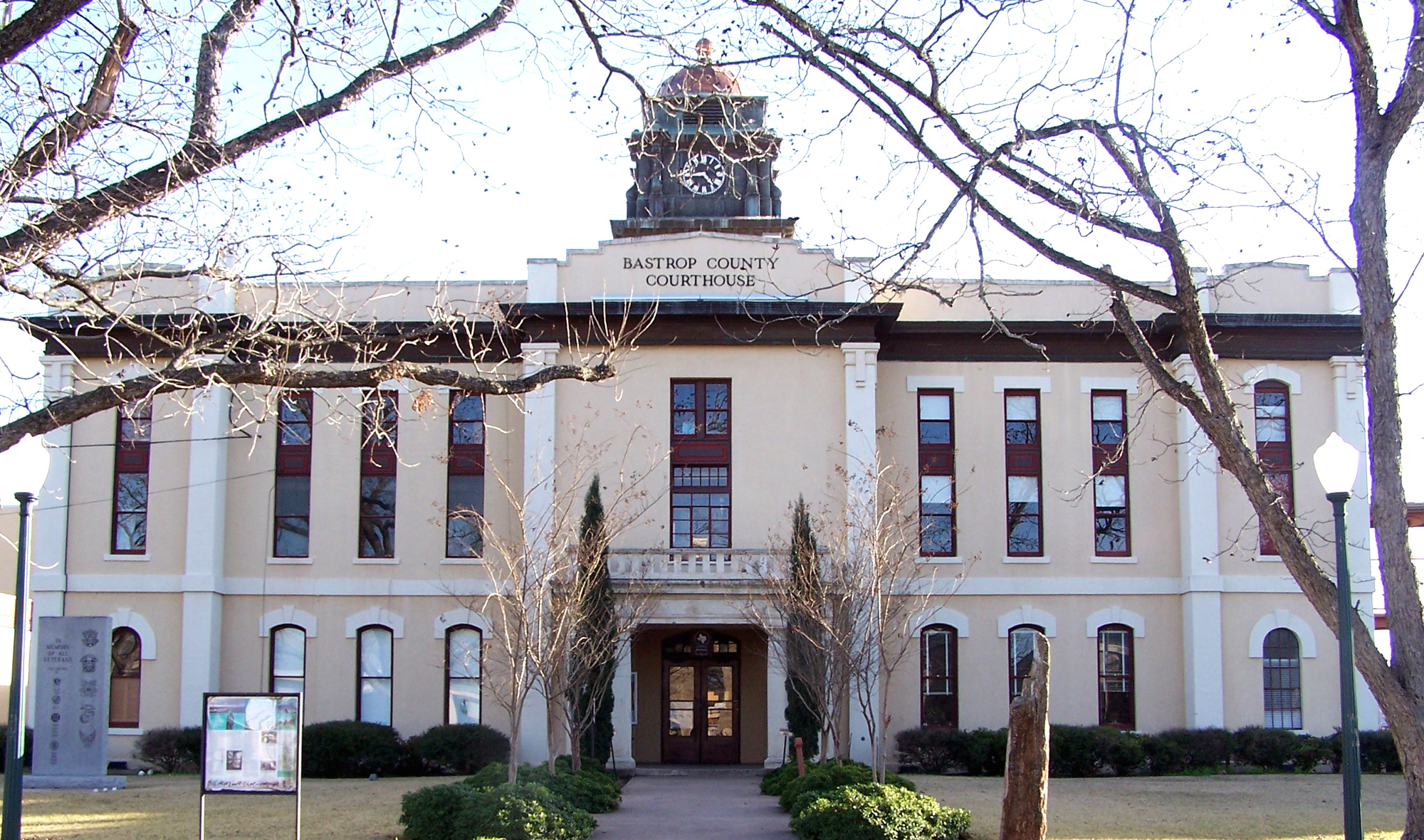
- Bastrop County Courthouse in 2006

- Location within Texas Location within the United States
- Interactive map showing the location of Bastrop Country Courthouse and Jail Complex
- Location: 804 Pecan St., Bastrop, Texas
- Coordinates: 30°6′46″N 97°18′56″W
- Area: 0.5 acres (0.20 ha)
- Built: 1883
- Architect: J. N. Preston & Son (courthouse); Martin, Byrnes & Johnston (jail)
- Architectural style: Classical Revival
- MPS: Bastrop Historic and Architectural MRA
- NRHP reference No.: 75001947
- TSAL No.: 8200000030
- RTHL No.: 9153 (Courthouse); 9154 (Jail)

Significant dates
- Added to NRHP: November 20, 1975
- Designated TSAL: May 28, 1981
- Designated RTHL: 1964 (Courthouse); 1977 (Jail)

The Bastrop County Courthouse is a historic courthouse built in 1883 at 803 Pine St, Bastrop, Texas. The Renaissance Revival style building was designed by J. N. Preston & Son. It was added to the National Register of Historic Places on November 20, 1975.

Bastrop County was organized in 1837 and several houses served as early courthouses. A brick courthouse with a jail was built on the courthouse square in 1851 and used until it burned in 1883. The present courthouse was erected immediately after the fire. The courthouse is a three-story, stuccoed-brick structure with a copper-domed clock tower in the center of a flat roof. The architects were J. N. Preston & Son, though the plans and specifications were afterwards revised by Frederick Ernst Ruffini, Preston's former partner. Originally not stuccoed, it was added in a remodeling in 1924. Also at this time, the dome was lowered and various architectural details were removed, giving the building a Neoclassical look. The addition of a wing to the south of the original building occurred in 1953–1954. The Austin architectural firm of Page, Southerland, and Page designed the south wing.

The three-story tan and red brick old Bastrop County Jail, opened in 1892, also stands on the courthouse square. The jail was remodeled in 1925, including improvements to the ventilating, heating, and sewage systems. In 1971, a new jail and sheriff's office were built on the courthouse square immediately to the southeast of the courthouse. The building ceased to be a jail in 1974 and was converted to office space. The courthouse and jail were renovated again in 1990. The courthouse square in Bastrop is surrounded mostly by houses and a church as opposed to the commercial buildings that surround the typical Texas courthouse square.

The county jail was moved to a new sheriff's office complex a mile southeast of the courthouse, and an annex to the courthouse was added on the square and dedicated in 2004.

== Gallery ==
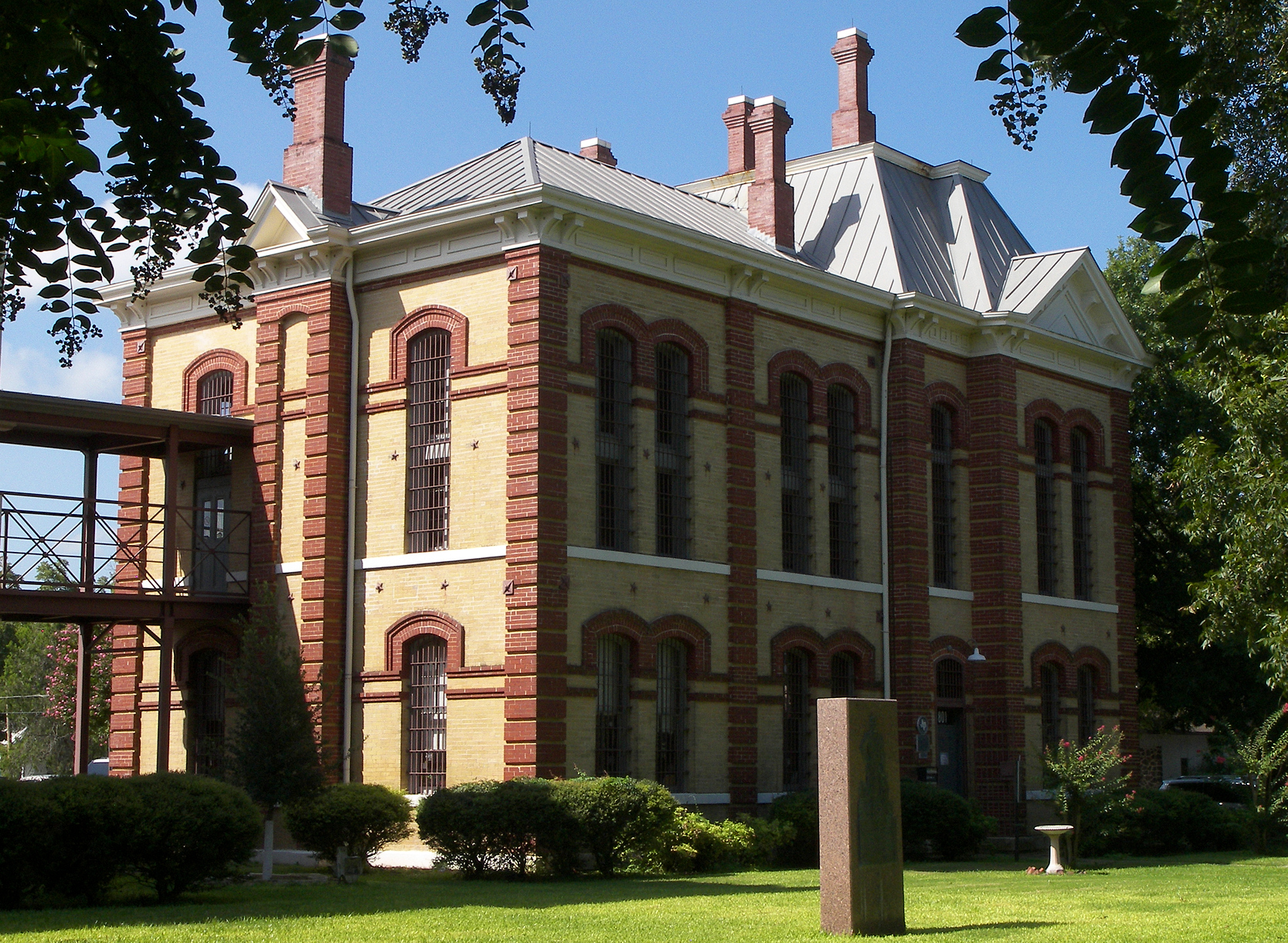
The old Bastrop County Jail (1892)

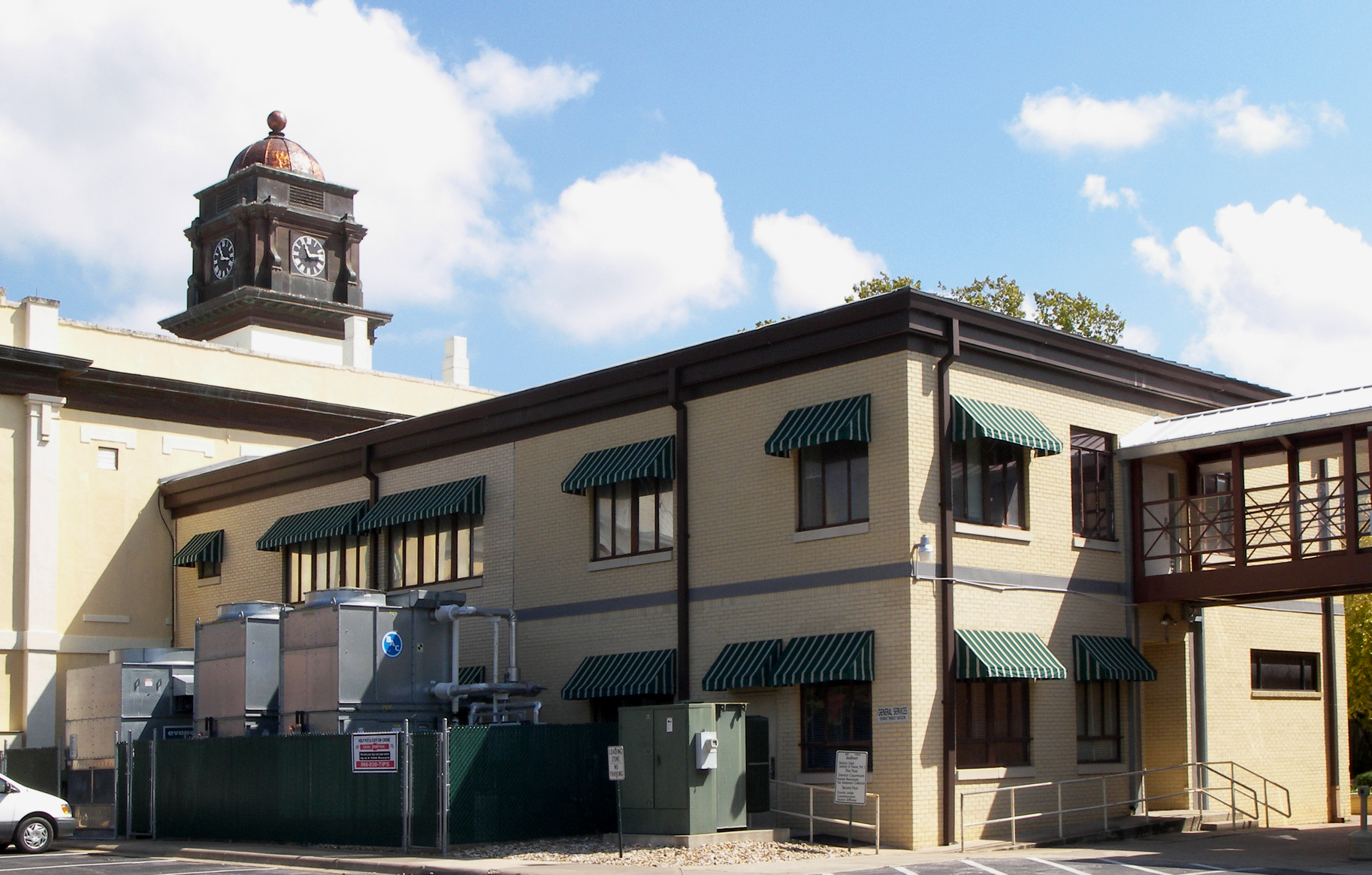
The south wing of the courthouse was added in 1953–1954.

== Other ==
J.W. Preston & Son also designed the National Register-listed Bell County Courthouse in Belton, Texas.

== See also ==
- National Register of Historic Places listings in Bastrop County, Texas
- Recorded Texas Historic Landmarks in Bastrop County
- List of county courthouses in Texas

== Bibliography ==
- Kelsey, Mavis P, Sr.; Dyal, Donald H. (1993). The Courthouses of Texas. College Station, TX: Texas A&M University Press. ISBN 0-89096-546-3.
