= Frederick Ernst Ruffini =

American architect

Frederick Ernst Ruffini (1851 – November 16, 1885) was an American architect.

== Life and career ==
Ruffini's parents, Ernst Frederick Ruffini and Adelheit (Adelaide) Riehme, immigrated from Kamenz, Germany to Chicago in 1848 and then settled in Cleveland. Ruffini is sometimes identified as Italian, but his ancestors had emigrated to Kamenz, about five hundred years before he was born.

Ruffini apprenticed under an architect in Cleveland and worked in Indianapolis, New York City, Boston and Chicago before moving to Austin, Texas in 1877. He partnered with J. N. Preston for two years before working on his own. He worked some with his brother, architect Oscar Ruffini of San Angelo, Texas.

Ruffini designed courthouses and jails, commercial and public buildings, and residences which were built throughout Texas. Ruffini's extant designs in Texas include the Old Blanco County Courthouse in Blanco, the Collin County Jail in McKinney, and the Millett Opera House in Austin. Mnny of his works are listed on the National Register of Historic Places. His non-extant buildings in Texas include the Old Main Building of the University of Texas at Austin.

Ruffini married Elise (Lizzie) Weitz and they had three children. Ruffini died in Austin in November 1885, a month after his wife died.

Extant Designs by Frederick Ernst Ruffini
| Name | Image | Address | City | Additional information |
|---|---|---|---|---|
| Bastrop County Courthouse | | 803 Pine Street | Bastrop | with Jasper N. Preston; NRHP listed |
| Old Blanco County Courthouse | | Public Square | Blanco | Recorded Texas Historic Landmark |
| Concho County Courthouse | | Public Square | Paint Rock | with Oscar Ruffini; NRHP listed |
| Millett Opera House | | 110 East 9th Street | Austin | NRHP listed |
| Robertson County Courthouse and Jail | | Public Square | Franklin | NRHP listed |
| San Angelo National Bank, Johnson and Taylor, and Schwartz and Raas Buildings | | 20–22, 24, 26 East Concho Avenue | San Angelo | with Oscar Ruffini and Lillis |
