= Cameron County Courthouse (1882) =

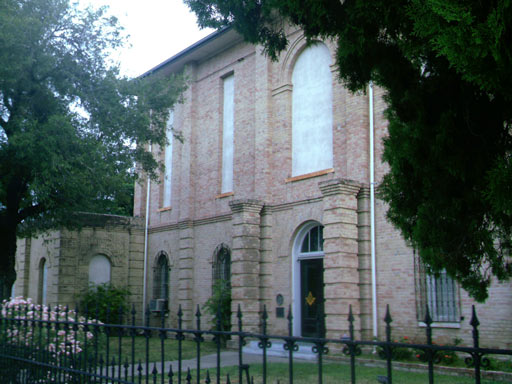
- 1882 Cameron County Courthouse

- Location within Texas Location within the United States
- 25°54′12″N 97°29′46″W
- Location: Brownsville, Texas

History
- Built: 1883

Site notes
- Architect: J. N. Preston
- Architectural style: Second Empire
- Governing body: Rio Grande Lodge No. 81, A.F.&A.M

Recorded Texas Historic Landmark
- Designated: 1962
- Reference no.: 640

The original Cameron County Courthouse, also known as the Rio Grande Masonic Lodge No. 81, is an historic building located at 1131 East Jefferson Street in Brownsville, Texas. It was designed by architect J. N. Preston in the Second Empire style of architecture. Built between 1882 and 1883 by S. W. Brooks as the first court house of Cameron County, it served as such until 1914 when the 1912 courthouse was completed. It was sold in 1914 to Rio Grande Lodge No. 81, A.F.&A.M., chartered in 1851, which still occupies it along with several appendant Masonic bodies. Its central clock tower and elaborate gabled roof were destroyed in the Labor Day 1933 hurricane and replaced by a flat roof.

== See also ==
- Cameron County Courthouse (1914)
- Recorded Texas Historic Landmarks in Cameron County
