= Cameron County Courthouse (1914) =

- U.S. National Register of Historic Places
- Texas State Antiquities Landmark
- Recorded Texas Historic Landmark
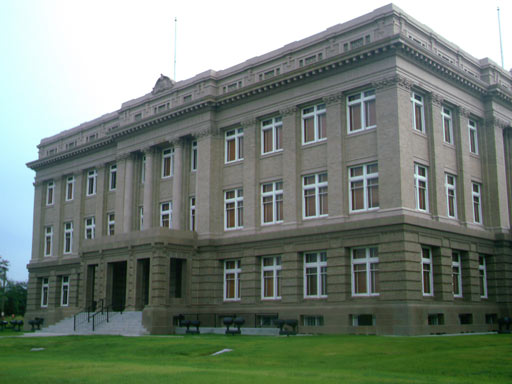
- Cameron County Courthouse of 1912

- Location within Texas Location within the United States
- Interactive map showing the location for Cameron County Courthouse
- Location: 1150 E. Madison St., Brownsville, Texas
- Coordinates: 25°54′13″N 97°29′43″W
- Area: 1 acre (0.40 ha)
- Built: 1912
- Built by: Builder: Gross Construction Co.
- Architect: Atlee B. Ayres
- Architectural style: Classical Revival
- NRHP reference No.: 80004084
- TSAL No.: 8200000155
- RTHL No.: 13830

Significant dates
- Added to NRHP: September 27, 1980
- Designated TSAL: January 1, 1992
- Designated RTHL: 2000

The Cameron County Courthouse is a historic building located at 1150 East Madison Street in Brownsville, Cameron County, Texas. It was designed by architect Atlee B. Ayres in the Classical Revival style of architecture. Built between 1912 and 1914 by Gross Construction Company as the second court house of Cameron County, it served as such until 1914 when the 1979 courthouse was completed in the 900 block of East Harrison Street. Its relatively plain exterior belies the grandeur of the art glass dome above its central rotunda. On September 27, 1980, it was added to the National Register of Historic Places. Between 1994 and 2006, the building was completely renovated at a cost of over $17 million. It was rededicated on October 17, 2006. Sometimes called the Dancy Building in honor of County Judge Oscar Cromwell Dancy, who championed its construction in 1912, it now houses the Cameron County Court at Law No. 1 as well as county offices.

The building also housed offices and a low-income clinic during the 1980s.

== See also ==
- Cameron County Courthouse (1882)
- National Register of Historic Places listings in Cameron County, Texas
- Recorded Texas Historic Landmarks in Cameron County
