= Driskill Hotel =

Hotel in Austin, Texas

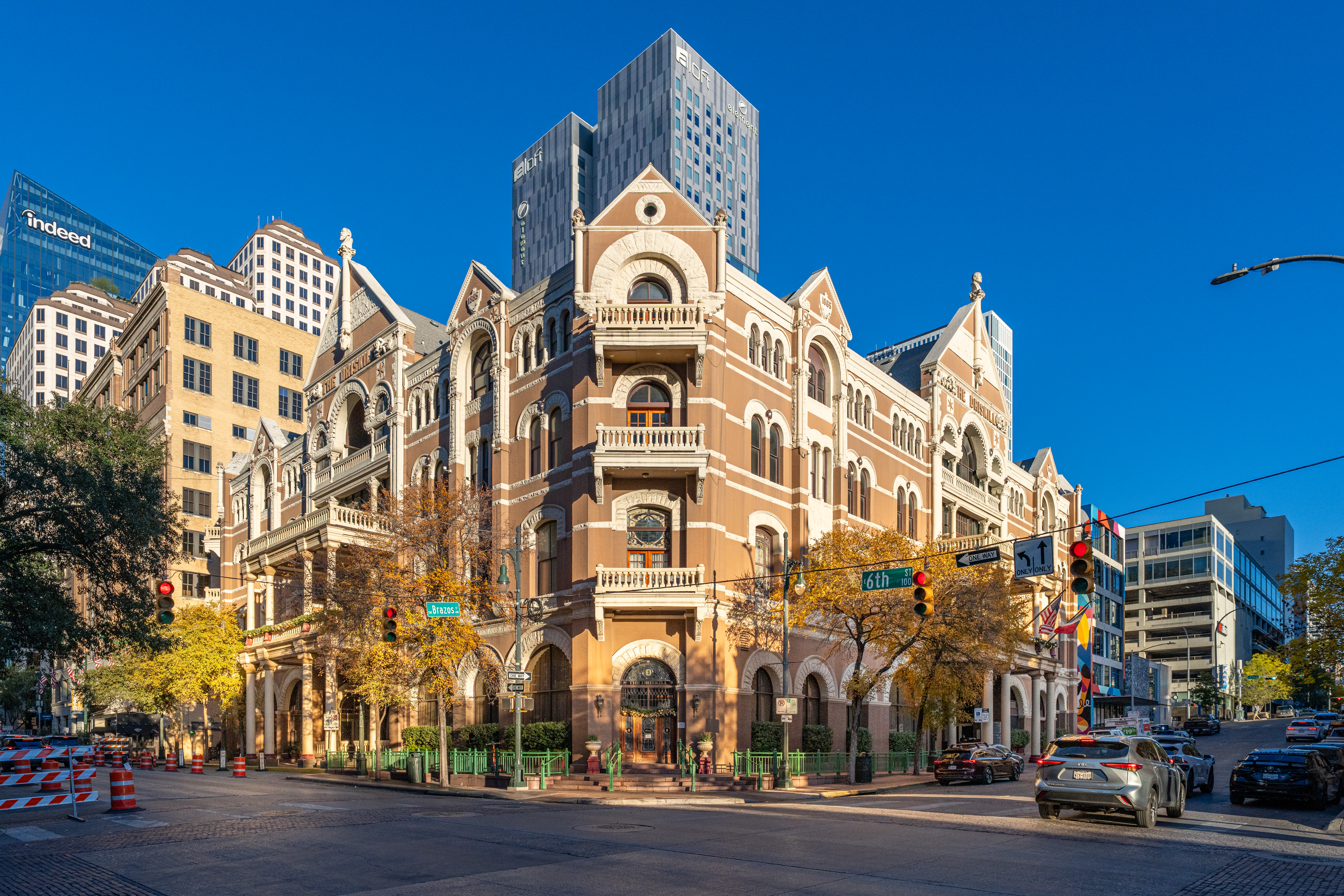
- The Driskill in 2025
- Interactive map of the Driskill Hotel area

General information
- Architectural style: Romanesque Revival, Richardsonian Romanesque, Eclectic
- Location: 604 Brazos Street, Austin, Travis County, Texas, United States
- Coordinates: 30°16′5″N 97°44′30″W
- Year built: 1886

Design and construction
- Architect: J. N. Preston & Son

Website
- driskillhotel.com

U.S. National Register of Historic Places
- Designated: November 25, 1969
- Reference no.: 69000212

Recorded Texas Historic Landmark
- Designated: 1966
- Reference no.: 13931

The Driskill, a Romanesque-style building completed in 1886, is the oldest operating hotel in Austin, Texas, United States, and one of the best-known hotels in Texas generally. The Driskill was conceived and built by Col. Jesse Driskill, a cattleman who spent his fortune constructing "the finest hotel south of St. Louis".

The Driskill has been operated by Hyatt Hotels Corporation since 2013. The hotel was listed in the National Register of Historic Places on November 25, 1969.

== Architecture and design ==
The Driskill is composed of two interconnected buildings; the original four-story Romanesque Revival building constructed in 1886, and a 13-story annex constructed in 1930.

The original building, designed by local Austin architects J. N. Preston & Son, was constructed with over six million pressed bricks and white limestone accents. The building contains two porticos on the southern and eastern facades, which contain large Richardsonian-style arches that were reputed to be the largest in Texas. The facade contains three limestone busts of Driskill and his sons; J.W. "Bud" Driskill facing Brazos Street, A. W. "Tobe" Driskill facing an alley on the west side, and Jesse Driskill facing Sixth Street, whose bust is surrounded by decorative carvings including longhorns on the gable ends.

The hotel opened with 60 rooms including 12 corner rooms with attached baths, a rare feature in hotels of the region at the time. At the center of the hotel was a four-story open rotunda capped by a domed skylight, which functioned as a flue to suck up the hot air and cool the building; the skylight was removed when air conditioning was installed on the roof in 1950. The building was designed for separate entrances for men and women. Two entrances, one on Sixth Street and another facing the alleyway on the west side the building, were reserved for men and were flanked by a saloon, billiard room, cigar shop, a newsstand and a barbershop featuring baths. The women's entrance on Brazos Street allowed female guests to proceed directly to their rooms, thereby avoiding the cigar smoke and rough talk of the cattlemen in the lobby. The second floor contained the main dining room and ballroom, separate parlors for men and women, a children's dining room, and bridal suites. Other embellishments included an electric bell system, marble bureaus, steam heating, and gas lighting.

The 13-story annex, designed by the El Paso architecture firm Trost & Trost, opened in 1930. The 180-room annex contains a bungalow penthouse that is only accessible from the building's roof. The bungalow contains two bedrooms with private baths, a living room, and a full kitchen. The bungalow was originally used as a private residence by superintendents of the Southern Pacific Railroad, but was later rented to high-profile guests including Jack Dempsey, Bob Hope, and President Lyndon Johnson. In 1979, the hotel manager restored the bungalow to use as his private residence.

== History ==
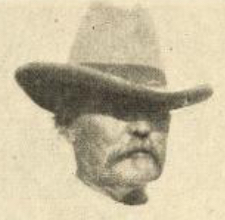
Jesse Driskill

Jesse Driskill, a successful cattle baron, had moved to Texas from Missouri in 1849. Flush with cash from his service to the Confederate Army, to which he supplied beef throughout the Civil War, he decided to diversify by constructing a grand hotel in Austin. In 1884, Driskill purchased land at the corner of 6th and Brazos for $7,500 and announced his plans for the hotel.

The hotel held a grand opening on December 20, 1886, and was featured in a special edition of the Austin Daily Statesman. On January 1, 1887, Governor Sul Ross held his inaugural ball in its ballroom, beginning a tradition for every Texas governor since. In May 1887, less than a year after it opened, Driskill was forced to close the hotel, as he could no longer afford to operate the hotel following a harsh winter and drought that killed his cattle inventory. In addition, S.E. McIlhenny, the hotel's general manager, and half of the staff were hired by the Beach Hotel in Galveston, which expedited the closure. Driskill sold the hotel in 1888 to his brother-in-law, Jim "Doc" Day, who reopened the hotel in January 1888.

Austin magnate George Littlefield, responsible for other Austin landmarks such as the Littlefield House, opened the Austin National Bank on the southeast corner of the building; the old bank vault still remains. Littlefield later purchased the hotel for $106,000 in 1895 and vowed that it would never close again. Littlefield invested over $60,000 in renovations, including ceiling frescoes, electric lighting, steam heating, and 28 additional lavatories, but still sold the hotel at a loss of $25,000 in 1903 to banking competitor, e.l. Wilmot. Under Wilmot's ownership, the hotel was managed by hotelier W.L. Stark, who added a barbershop and women's spa featuring Victorian-style Turkish baths, oversaw the construction of the annex, and adorned the former smoking room with eight antique Austrian gold leaf-framed mirrors previously owned by Maximilian and Carlota of Mexico.

In 1950, the hotel embarked on a renovation, which closed off the Sixth Street entrance and removed the rotunda's skylight to make way for air conditioning units on the roof. In 1952, the former Austin National Bank was transformed into a television studio for KTBC, the very first television station in Central Texas.

In 1969, The Driskill closed its guest rooms in anticipation of a renovation and new tower containing a modern glass facade, which never materialized. Most of its furnishings were sold, and an American-Statesman article declared, "Driskill Hotel's Fate 'Sealed'." The hotel was saved from the wrecking ball at almost the last minute, however, when a nonprofit organization called the Driskill Hotel Corporation raised $900,000.

Braniff International Hotels, Inc., a division of Braniff Airways, Inc., of Dallas, Texas, bought the hotel in 1972 and began a $350,000 restoration of the grand lobby of the historic facility. Braniff reopened the hotel to customers on January 15, 1973, to very strong bookings and conference business. Braniff threw an official grand reopening celebration on February 10, 1973. Over 1000 guests attended the gala event that included a parade of every Texas Governor and/or their descendants, since 1886. All proceeds from the event went to the Austin Heritage Society, who was strategically instrumental in the resurrection of the Hotel Driskill.

In 1995, The Driskill was purchased by Great American Life Insurance, who embarked on a $30 million renovation to restore the hotel to its original appearance, which had been heavily modified over the years. The hotel closed for four years for renovation work and was re-opened in a Millennium celebration on December 31, 1999.

In 2013, The Driskill was purchased by Hyatt Hotels Corporation for $85 million, who embarked on an $8 million renovation of the hotel. Hyatt sold the hotel to Dallas-based Woodbine Development in May 2022 for $125 million.

The hotel is said to be home to more than one ghost, including seven-year-old Samantha, who died after falling down the Grand Staircase chasing a ball.

== Noteworthy events at the Driskill Hotel ==
In 1908, the Daughters of the Republic of Texas met at the Driskill hotel to discuss the fate of the Alamo Mission in San Antonio. At the meeting, a divide between two factions of the group erupted over whether to demolish or preserve the structure.

On October 12, 1931, Louis Armstrong opened a three-day performance at the Driskill Hotel. In attendance was Charles Black, a freshman at University of Texas at Austin at the time, who cited the performance as inspiration for his interest in race and civil rights.

In 1934, future President Lyndon Johnson met his future wife, Claudia Taylor, for their first date at the Driskill dining room. It became his campaign headquarters during his congressional career, especially during his famous 1948 Senate race, and became a favorite place on return trips to Austin during his presidency. He watched the results of the 1964 Presidential Election from its presidential suite and addressed supporters from its ballroom after his victory.

President Bill Clinton stayed in the four-room Cattle Baron's suite when he visited Austin in 1999.

On September 11, 2001, Jenna Bush, daughter of President George W. Bush, was relocated to the hotel by the Secret Service in the wake of the terrorist attacks earlier that day.

On March 17, 2018, actor Bill Murray and cellist Jan Vogler recited the poem "Dog" by Lawrence Ferlinghetti from the front steps of the Driskill Hotel to promote the film Isle of Dogs during the 2018 South by Southwest festival.

== Gallery ==
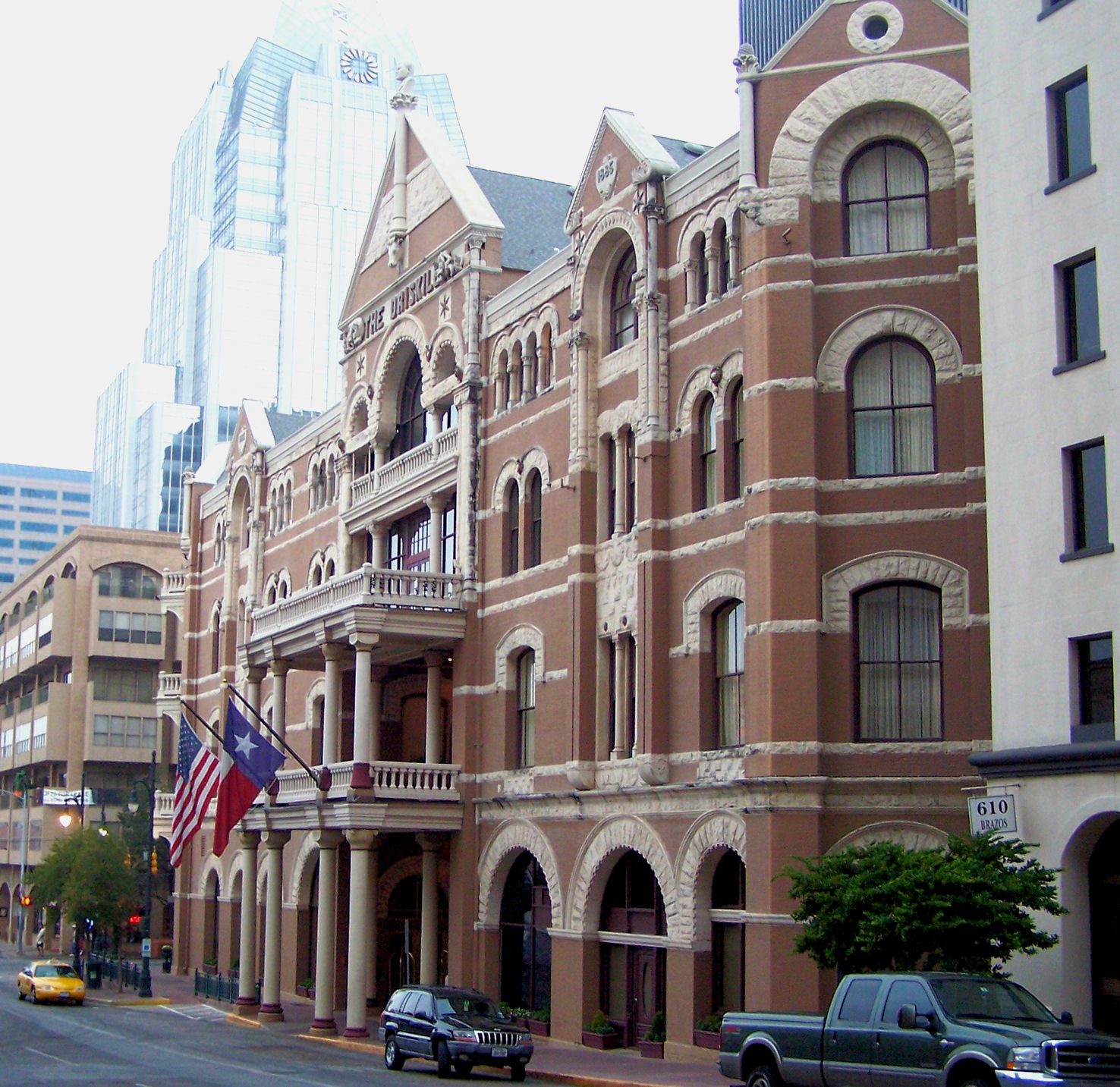
Driskill Hotel in 2006

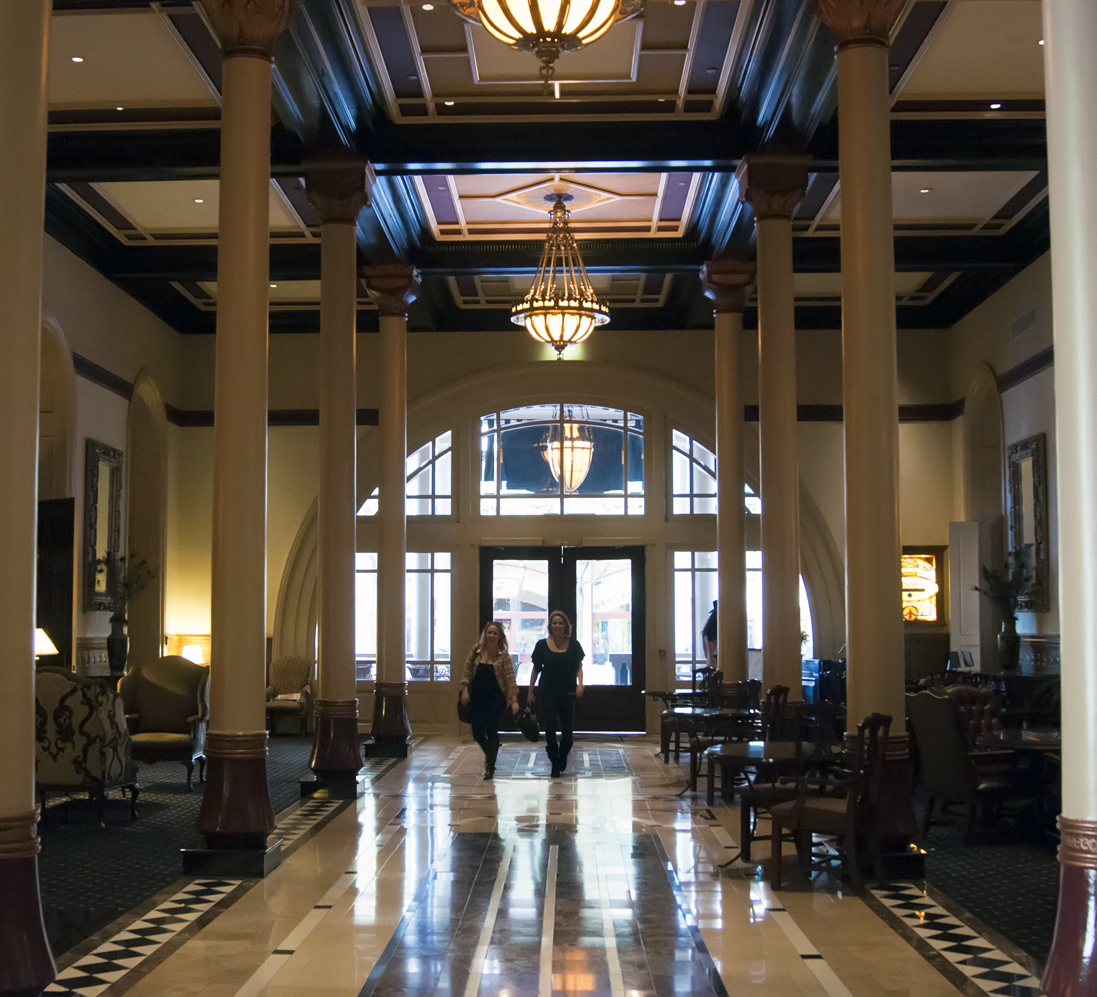
Driskill lobby facing the Sixth Street entrance

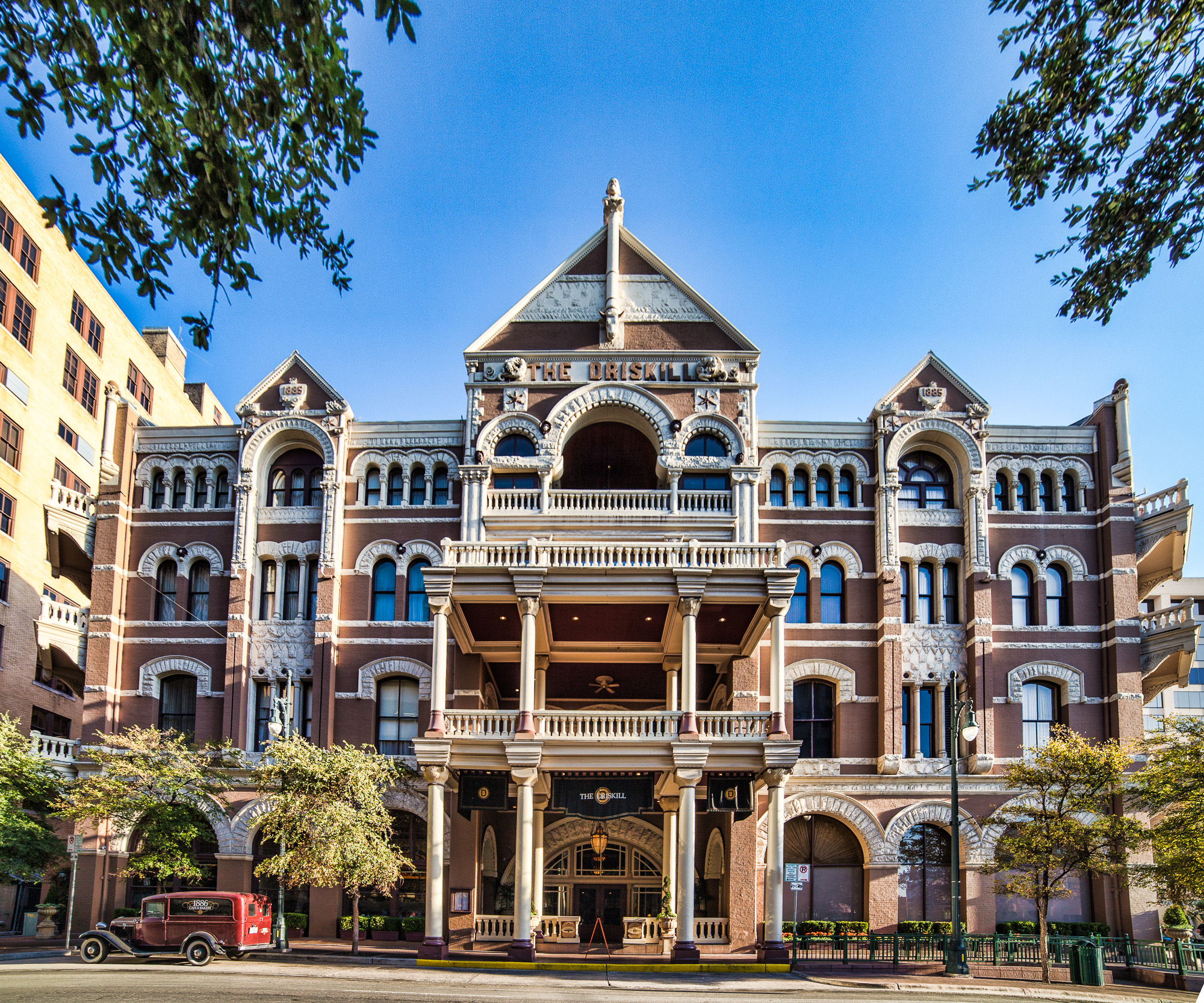
Driskill exterior in 2011

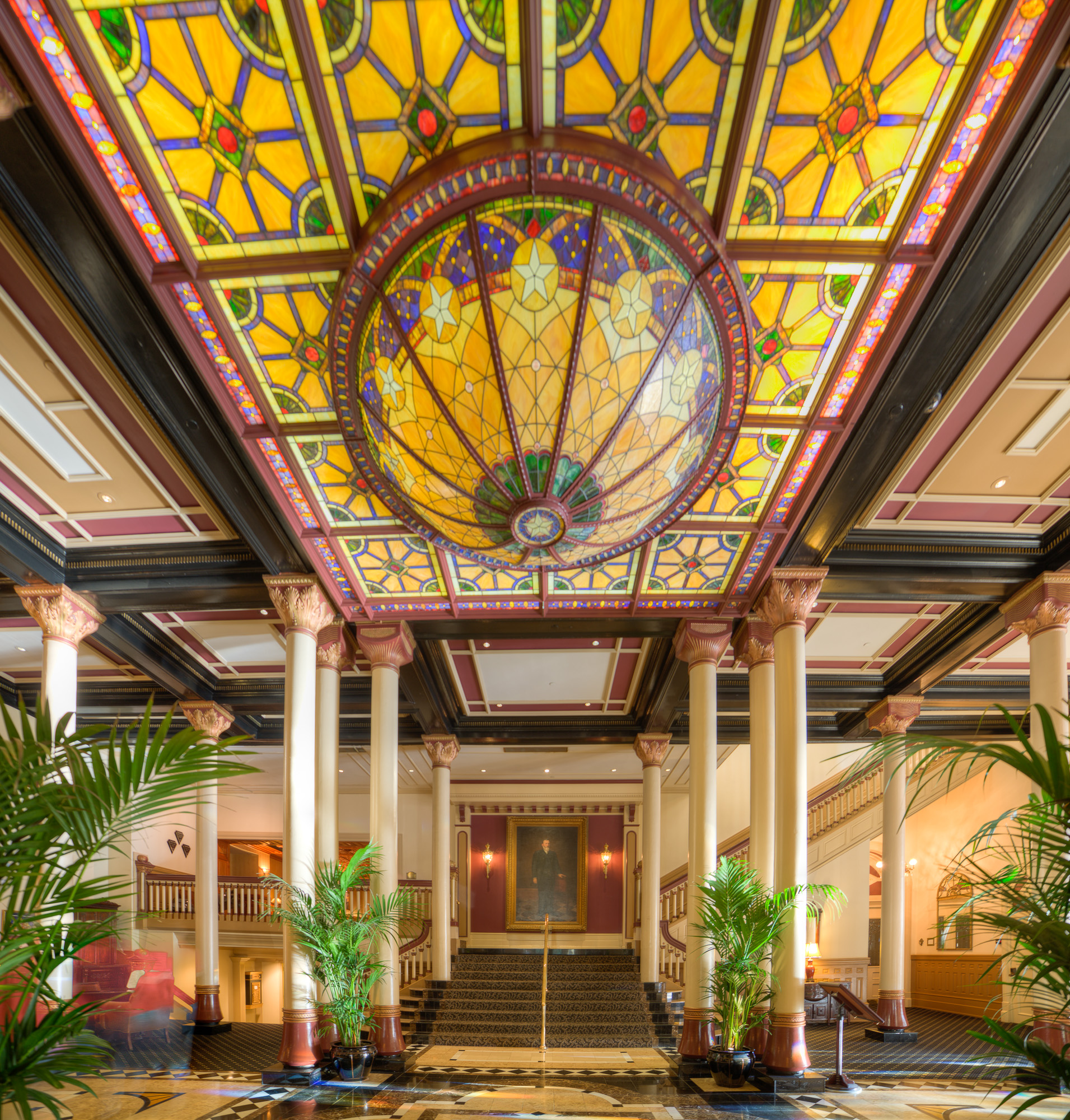
Driskill lobby in 2011

Exterior building detail

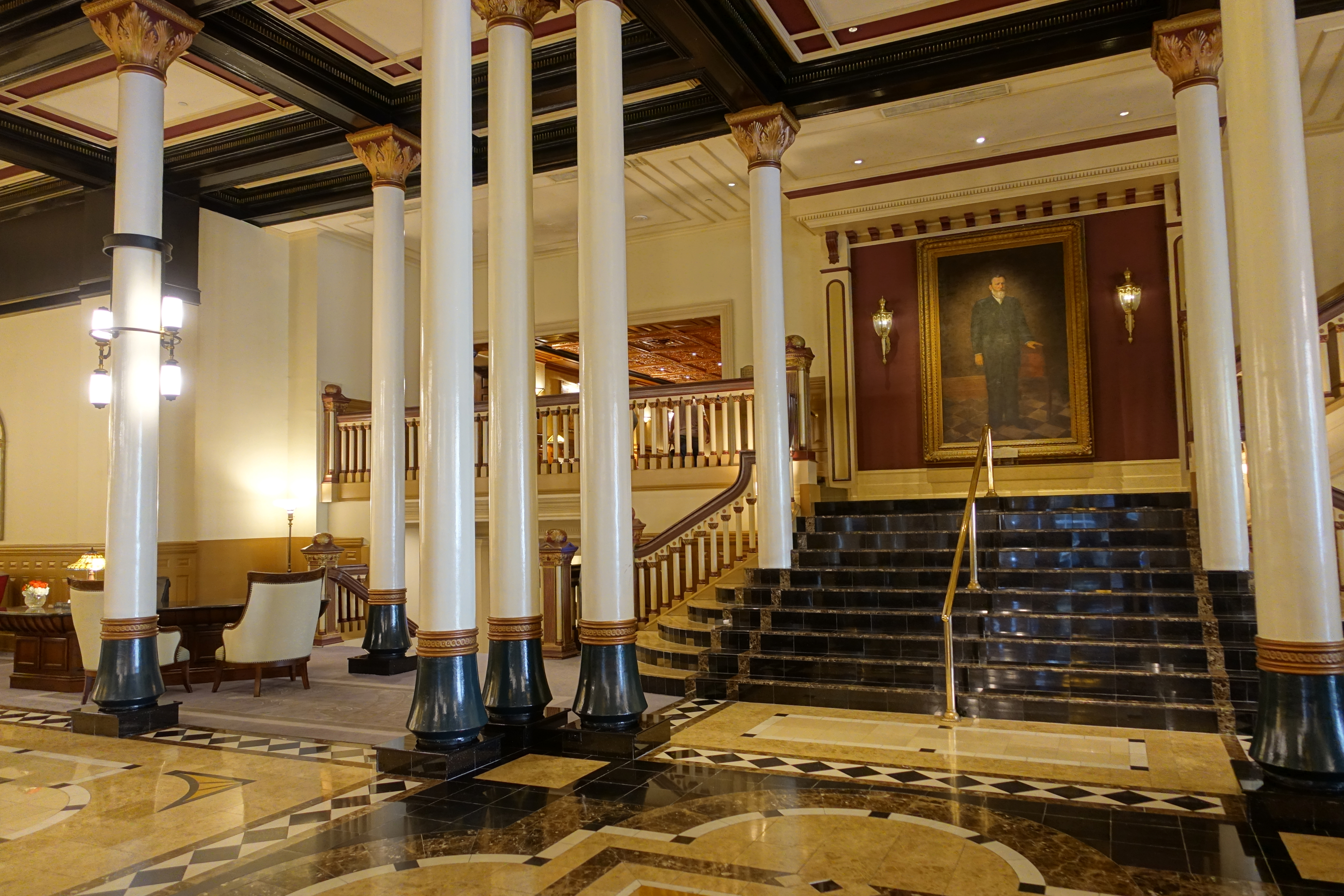
Driskill lobby in 2015

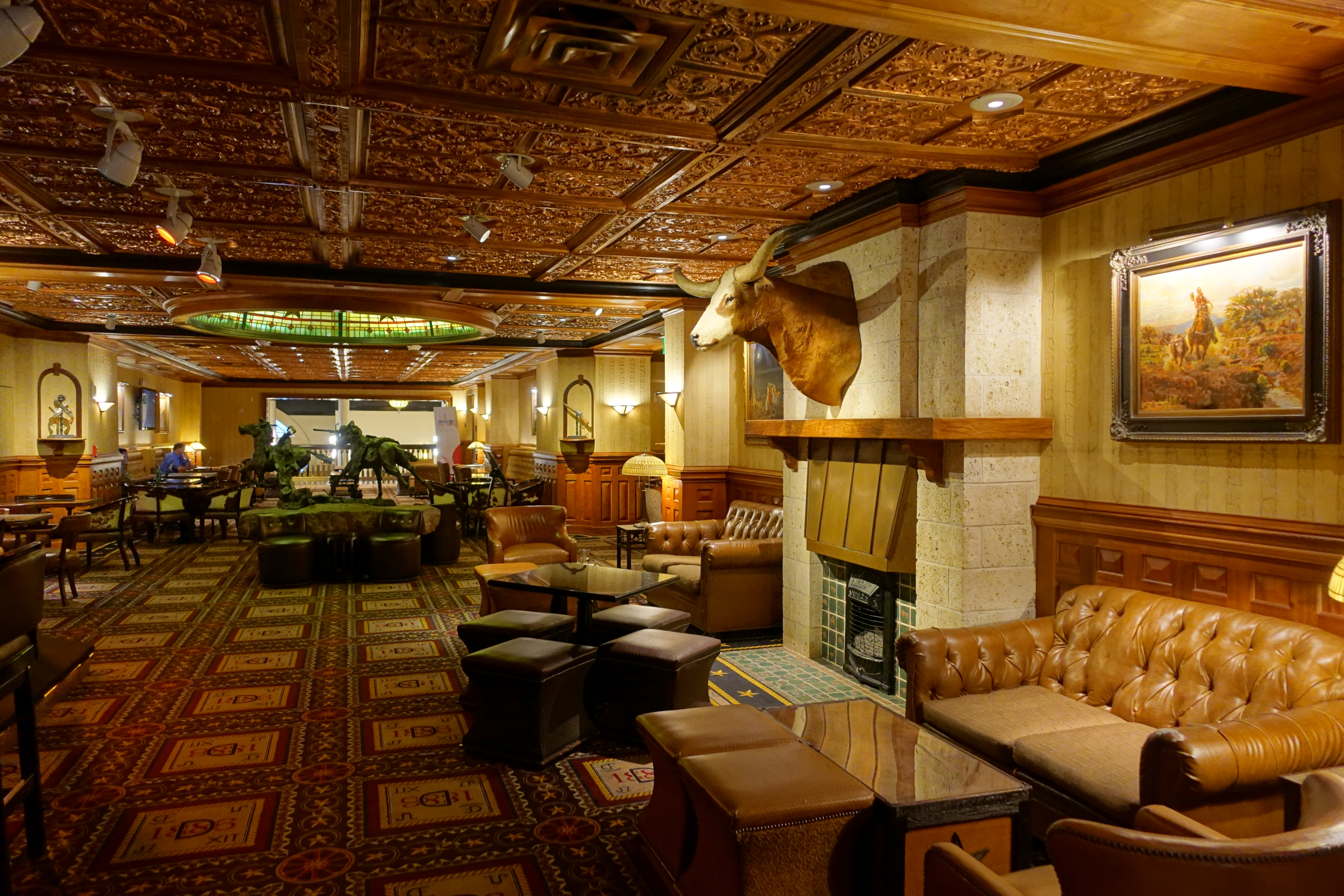
Driskill hotel lounge

== See also ==
- National Register of Historic Places listings in Travis County, Texas
- Recorded Texas Historic Landmarks in Travis County
