= List of Beta Sigma Phi chapters =

Beta Sigma Phi is an international noncollegiate sorority. It was established on April 30, 1931, in Abilene, Kansas. By 1975, it had established more than 10,000 chapters. Chapters are organized based on the sorority's membership classes: Ritual of Jewels (RJ), Exemplar (EX), Preceptor (XP), Laureate (PL), Master (MA), Torchbearer (TO), and Online (OL).

== Chapters ==
Following is an incomplete list of chapters, primarily based on a list of chapters that were active in 2026.

=== Ritual of Jewels chapters ===
Following are the active Ritual of Jewels chapters of Beta Sigma Phi as of 2026, along with known inactive chapters.

Number	Chapter	Charter date and range	Location	State or province	Status	Ref.
RJ 103	International Alpha		Kansas City, Missouri	MO	Active	
RJ 114	Alpha	April 30, 1931	Abilene, Kansas	KS	Active	
	Gamma	1934	Butte, Montana	MT	Inactive	
	Tau	June 1943	Butte, Montana	MT	Inactive	
	Chi	1944–1954, 1955	Butte, Montana	MT	Inactive	(Note: Became the Exemplar Xi Lambda chapter in 1954. Then, reestablished in 1955.)
RJ 125	Zeta		Lincoln, Nebraska	NE	Active	
RJ 173	Alpha		Sacramento, California	CA	Active	
RJ 217	Iota		Long Beach, California	CA	Active	
RJ 279	Epsilon		Richmond, Indiana	IN	Active	
RJ 294	Alpha		Niagara Falls, New York	NY	Active	
RJ 339	Rho		Ponca City, Oklahoma	OK	Active	
RJ 351	Gamma		Columbus, Ohio	OH	Active	
RJ 390	Alpha Pi		Taylorville, Illinois	IL	Active	
RJ 419	Alpha Theta		Chariton, Iowa	IA	Active	
RJ 513	Upsilon		Poplar Bluff, Missouri	MO	Active	
RJ 737	Alpha Omicron		Abilene, Texas	TX	Active	
RJ 809	Alpha Zeta		Moberly, Missouri	MO	Active	
RJ 892	Beta Pi		Du Quoin, Illinois	IL	Active	
RJ 899	Beta Sigma		Eldorado, Illinois	IL	Active	
RJ 964	Gamma Beta		Watseka, Illinois	IL	Active	
RJ 1008	Alpha Rho		Liberal, Kansas	KS	Active	
RJ 1208	Beta Beta		Bethany, Missouri	MO	Active	
RJ 1312	Iota		Bessemer, Alabama	AL	Active	
RJ 1320	Beta Pi		Dubuque, Iowa	IA	Active	
RJ 1322	Rho		Raleigh, North Carolina	NC	Active	
RJ 1328	Sigma		Kinston, North Carolina	NC	Active	
RJ 1398	Chi		Tacoma, Washington	WA	Active	
RJ 1400	Alpha Phi		Logansport, Indiana	IN	Active	
RJ 1453	Eta		Florence, South Carolina	SC	Active	
RJ 1892	Delta Omega		Alturas, California	CA	Active	
RJ 1903	Epsilon Alpha		Canton, Illinois	IL	Active	
RJ 1982	Sigma		Ottawa, Ontario, Canada	ON	Active	
RJ 2209	Delta Delta		Lafayette, Indiana	IN	Active	
RJ 2212	Delta Epsilon		New Albany, Indiana	IN	Active	
RJ 2252	Gamma Lambda		Mexico, Missouri	MO	Active	
RJ 2320	Gamma Pi		Wellsville, New York	NY	Active	
RJ 2328	Alpha Kappa		Albany, Georgia	GA	Active	
RJ 2368	Rho		Ely, Nevada	NV	Active	
RJ 2385	Alpha Alpha		Decatur, Alabama	AL	Active	
RJ 2407	Beta Rho		Manhattan, Kansas	KS	Active	
RJ 2431	Gamma Sigma		Mason City, Iowa	IA	Active	
RJ 2460	Zeta Iota		New Braunfels, Texas	TX	Active	
RJ 2465	Epsilon Psi		Litchfield, Illinois	IL	Active	
RJ 2500	Alpha Psi		Virginia, Minnesota	MN	Active	
RJ 2604	Eta Alpha		Quincy, California	CA	Active	
RJ 2613	Eta Gamma		South San Francisco, California	CA	Active	
RJ 2662	Alpha Gamma		Socorro, New Mexico	NM	Active	
RJ 2663	Zeta Zeta		Metropolis, Illinois	IL	Active	
RJ 2691	Eta Mu		Bay City, Texas	TX	Active	
RJ 2716	Delta Zeta		Atlantic, Iowa	IA	Active	
RJ 2752	Alpha Psi		Brunswick, Georgia	GA	Active	
RJ 2773	Eta Omega		Waxahachie, Texas	TX	Active	
RJ 2789	Alpha Xi		Hazard, Kentucky	KY	Active	
RJ 2825	Epsilon Eta		Muncy, Pennsylvania	PA	Active	
RJ 2851	Delta Nu		Belmond, Iowa	IA	Active	
RJ 2908	Delta Pi		Binghamton, New York	NY	Active	
RJ 2924	Alpha Omega		Nebraska City, Nebraska	NE	Active	
RJ 2996	Zeta Tau		Carterville, Illinois	IL	Active	
RJ 2999	Theta Phi		Temple, Texas	TX	Active	
RJ 3117	Theta Zeta		Cloverdale, California	CA	Active	
RJ 3191	Alpha Chi		Fayetteville, North Carolina	NC	Active	
RJ 3225	Delta Rho		Hayti, Missouri	MO	Active	
RJ 3333	Alpha Zeta		Los Alamos, New Mexico	NM	Active	
RJ 3341	Beta Eta		Hamlin, West Virginia	WV	Active	
RJ 3343	Alpha Chi		Natchitoches, Louisiana	LA	Active	
RJ 3348	Iota Theta		Antioch, California	CA	Active	
RJ 3356	Gamma Eta		Pompano Beach, Florida	FL	Active	
RJ 3444	Beta Xi		Burlington, Ontario, Canada	ON	Active	
RJ 3520	Beta Omega		Arvada, Colorado	CO	Active	
RJ 3703	Epsilon Eta		Hawarden, Iowa	IA	Active	
RJ 3778	Beta Omicron		Asheville, North Carolina	NC	Active	
RJ 3803	Epsilon Epsilon		Cape Girardeau, Missouri	MO	Active	
RJ 3833	Gamma Upsilon		Phillipsburg, Kansas	KS	Active	
RJ 3847	Lambda Phi		Lamesa, Texas	TX	Active	
RJ 3859	Beta Xi		Portsmouth, Virginia	VA	Active	
RJ 3867	Delta Delta		Tampa, Florida	FL	Active	
RJ 3932	Alpha Chi		Albuquerque, New Mexico	NM	Active	
RJ 3958	Lambda Iota		Orland, California	CA	Active	
RJ 3993	Gamma Psi		Durant, Oklahoma	OK	Active	
RJ 4053	Alpha		St. John's, Newfoundland and Labrador, Canada	NL	Active	
RJ 4059	Delta Kappa		Fort Myers, Florida	FL	Active	
RJ 4078	Delta Mu		Russell, Kansas	KS	Active	
RJ 4090	Gamma Theta		Cheney, Washington	WA	Active	
RJ 4215	Epsilon Phi		Farmington, Missouri	MO	Active	
RJ 4220	Gamma Xi		Yakima, Washington	WA	Active	
RJ 4264	Beta Theta		Arkadelphia, Arkansas	AR	Active	
RJ 4278	Omicron Gamma		Rusk, Texas	TX	Active	
RJ 4417	Delta Kappa		Tahlequah, Oklahoma	OK	Active	
RJ 4526	Pi Eta		Seguin, Texas	TX	Active	
RJ 4546	Delta Omega		Cocoa, Florida	FL	Active	
RJ 4570	Epsilon Epsilon		Brooksville, Florida	FL	Active	
RJ 4630	Pi Psi		Bryan, Texas	TX	Active	
RJ 4650	Epsilon Nu		Parsons, Kansas	KS	Active	
RJ 4672	Beta Lambda		Rochester, Minnesota	MN	Active	
RJ 4673	Pi Rho		Pleasanton, California	CA	Active	
RJ 4837	Rho Eta		Oroville, California	CA	Active	
RJ 4880	Eta Nu		Levittown, Pennsylvania	PA	Active	
RJ 4906	Alpha Nu		Spearfish, South Dakota	SD	Active	
RJ 5023	Zeta Gamma		Cherryvale, Kansas	KS	Active	
RJ 5041	Eta Theta		Nevada, Missouri	MO	Active	
RJ 5130	Tau Alpha		Orland, California	CA	Active	
RJ 5150	Gamma Xi		Claxton, Georgia	GA	Active	
RJ 5166	Tau Eta		Hemet, California	CA	Active	
RJ 5215	Beta Kappa		Whitesburg, Kentucky	KY	Active	
RJ 5222	Lambda Nu		Galva, Illinois	IL	Active	
RJ 5233	Tau Phi		San Clemente, California	CA	Active	
RJ 5309	Beta Rho		St. Martinville, Louisiana	LA	Active	
RJ 5320	Zeta Pi		Iowa City, Iowa	IA	Active	
RJ 5330	Epsilon Zeta		Broomfield, Colorado	CO	Active	
RJ 5337	Alpha Tau		Mount Airy, Maryland	MD	Active	
RJ 5356	Alpha Mu		Comox, British Columbia, Canada	BC	Active	
RJ 5363	Theta Alpha		Sayre, Pennsylvania	PA	Active	
RJ 5411	Zeta Mu		Russell, Kansas	KS	Active	
RJ 5413	Delta Upsilon		Othello, Washington	WA	Active	
RJ 5583	Gamma Psi		Fayetteville, North Carolina	NC	Active	
RJ 5609	Zeta Upsilon		Bradenton, Florida	FL	Active	
RJ 5649	Theta Eta		Florissant, Missouri	MO	Active	
RJ 5651	Alpha Omega		Springerville, Arizona	AZ	Active	
RJ 5662	Gamma Kappa		Rayne, Louisiana	LA	Active	
RJ 5681	Alpha Chi		Orofino, Idaho	ID	Active	
RJ 5695	Beta Delta		Eloy, Arizona	AZ	Active	
RJ 5787	Eta Nu		Punta Gorda, Florida	FL	Active	
RJ 5798	Mu Epsilon		Mount Vernon, Ohio	OH	Active	
RJ 5810	Gamma Lambda		Houma, Louisiana	LA	Active	
RJ 5861	Beta Mu		Page, Arizona	AZ	Active	
RJ 5989	Theta Zeta		Plant City, Florida	FL	Active	
RJ 6000	Psi Delta		Copperas Cove, Texas	TX	Active	
RJ 6005	Delta Pi		Burlington, Ontario, Canada	ON	Active	
RJ 6073	Delta Kappa		Albany, Georgia	GA	Active	
RJ 6136	Theta Theta		Goshen, Indiana	IN	Active	
RJ 6161	Eta Beta		Indianola, Iowa	IA	Active	
RJ 6178	Eta Epsilon		Clarinda, Iowa	IA	Active	
RJ 6240	Beta Alpha Beta		Winters, California	CA	Active	
RJ 6362	Iota Beta		Leesburg, Florida	FL	Active	
RJ 6421	Epsilon Beta		Kitchener, Ontario, Canada	ON	Active	
RJ 6433	Epsilon Delta		Cambridge, Ontario, Canada	ON	Active	
RJ 6451	Eta Lambda		Knoxville, Iowa	IA	Active	
RJ 6462	Epsilon Zeta		Sioux Lookout, Ontario, Canada	ON	Active	
RJ 6489	Alpha Omega		Waldorf, Maryland	MD	Active	
RJ 6619	Nu Mu		Centralia, Illinois	IL	Active	
RJ 6642	Zeta Eta		Englewood, Colorado	CO	Active	
RJ 6745	Alpha Tau		Reno, Nevada	NV	Active	
RJ 6775	Iota Lambda		Warfordsburg, Pennsylvania	PA	Active	
RJ 6860	Theta Chi		Edinburgh, Indiana	IN	Active	
RJ 6874	Eta Chi		Wichita, Kansas	KS	Active	
RJ 6898	Mu		Greenwood, Nova Scotia, Canada	NS	Active	
RJ 6907	Alpha Beta Chi		Lufkin, Texas	TX	Active	
RJ 6911	Zeta Psi		Guymon, Oklahoma	OK	Active	
RJ 6939	Sigma		Kodiak, Alaska	AK	Active	
RJ 6941	Omicron Delta		Nokomis, Illinois	IL	Active	
RJ 6984	Eta Delta		Ponca City, Oklahoma	OK	Active	
RJ 7040	Delta Beta Omicron		Arroyo Grande, California	CA	Active	
RJ 7071	Kappa Rho		DeLand, Florida	FL	Active	
RJ 7111	Delta Sigma		Corvallis, Oregon	OR	Active	
RJ 7187	Kappa Beta		Dowagiac, Michigan	MI	Active	
RJ 7210	Theta Beta		Sherman, New York	NY	Active	
RJ 7233	Kappa Mu		Mexico, Missouri	MO	Active	
RJ 7300	Upsilon		Camden, New Jersey	NJ	Active	
RJ 7425	Epsilon Delta		Savannah, Georgia	GA	Active	
RJ 7470	Omicron Omega		Moline, Illinois	IL	Active	
RJ 7471	Kappa Theta		South Haven, Michigan	MI	Active	
RJ 7495	Kappa Tau		Savannah, Missouri	MO	Active	
RJ 7520	Theta Theta		Coffeyville, Kansas	KS	Active	
RJ 7538	Gamma Kappa		Flemingsburg, Kentucky	KY	Active	
RJ 7613	Delta Kappa		North Little Rock, Arkansas	AR	Active	
RJ 7677	Alpha Zeta Epsilon		Albany, Texas	TX	Active	
RJ 7735	Gamma Lambda		Hindman, Kentucky	KY	Active	
RJ 7749	Alpha Lambda		Mobile, Alabama	AL	Active	
RJ 7751	Lambda Zeta		Bolivar, Missouri	MO	Active	
RJ 7758	Theta Iota		Owego, New York	NY	Active	
RJ 7762	Eta Sigma		Watonga, Oklahoma	OK	Active	
RJ 7782	Xi		Jackson, Mississippi	MS	Active	
RJ 7866	Epsilon Chi		Lafayette, Tennessee	TN	Active	
RJ 7869	Epsilon Sigma		Ville Platte, Louisiana	LA	Active	
RJ 7917	Theta Tau		Columbus, Kansas	KS	Active	
RJ 7953	Pi Omicron		West Chester, Ohio	OH	Active	
RJ 7954	Zeta Kappa		Harrow, Ontario, Canada	ON	Active	
RJ 7981	Delta Xi		Crossett, Arkansas	AR	Active	
RJ 8043	Kappa Xi		Lewistown, Pennsylvania	PA	Active	
RJ 8068	Zeta Pi		St. Catharines, Ontario, Canada	ON	Active	
RJ 8131	Beta Delta		Watertown, South Dakota	SD	Active	
RJ 8135	Gamma Psi		Hopkinton, Massachusetts	MA	Active	
RJ 8153	Epsilon Sigma		Hawkinsville, Georgia	GA	Active	
RJ 8156	Theta Rho		New Hampton, Iowa	IA	Active	
RJ 8157	Theta Sigma		Sumner, Iowa	IA	Active	
RJ 8224	Epsilon Xi		Hickory, North Carolina	NC	Active	
RJ 8228	Iota Beta		Medicine Lodge, Kansas	KS	Active	
RJ 8273	Theta Eta		Miami, Oklahoma	OK	Active	
RJ 8293	Epsilon Xi		Manassas, Virginia	VA	Active	
RJ 8347	Alpha Iota		Scranton, Pennsylvania	PA	Active	
RJ 8361	Gamma Mu		Kelowna, British Columbia, Canada	BC	Active	
RJ 8363	Beta Omega		Columbia, South Carolina	SC	Active	
RJ 8396	Alpha Tau		Lafayette, Indiana	IN	Active	
RJ 8407	Mu Psi		Dearborn, Missouri	MO	Active	
RJ 8411	Mu Omega		Sweet Springs, Missouri	MO	Active	
RJ 8424	Epsilon Psi		Ridgeway, Virginia	VA	Active	
RJ 8442	Iota Eta		Louisburg, Kansas	KS	Active	
RJ 8480	Eta Zeta		Simcoe, Ontario, Canada	ON	Active	
RJ 8489	Nu Zeta		Fredericktown, Missouri	MO	Active	
RJ 8516	Eta Chi		Orange, Texas	TX	Active	
RJ 8550	Gamma Omega		Kingman, Arizona	AZ	Active	
RJ 8554	Iota Iota		Parker, Kansas	KS	Active	
RJ 8605	Delta Iota		Gulf Shores, Alabama	AL	Active	
RJ 8664	Psi Chi		Palo Alto, California	CA	Active	
RJ 8678	Delta Epsilon Rho		Hilmar, California	CA	Active	
RJ 8700	Alpha Gamma Omega		San Angelo, Texas	TX	Active	
RJ 8711	Gamma Upsilon		Jenkins, Kentucky	KY	Active	
RJ 8716	Theta Pi		Canton, New York	NY	Active	
RJ 8761	Zeta Xi		Houma, Louisiana	LA	Active	
RJ 8788	Alpha Iota Rho		Brenham, Texas	TX	Active	
RJ 8879	Gamma Pi		Cleveland, Mississippi	MS	Active	
RJ 8889	Delta Mu		Fort Dodge, Iowa	IA	Active	
RJ 8916	Theta Psi		Grove, Oklahoma	OK	Active	
RJ 8972	Alpha Kappa Rho		Yoakum, Texas	TX	Active	
RJ 9011	Zeta Omicron		Union City, Tennessee	TN	Active	
RJ 9013	Nu Psi		Lexington, Missouri	MO	Active	
RJ 9054	Omicron Beta		Bosworth, Missouri	MO	Active	
RJ 9091	Eta Tau		Elgin, Ontario, Canada	ON	Active	
RJ 9176	Eta Tau		Fowler, Colorado	CO	Active	
RJ 9178	Omicron Epsilon		Lucerne, Missouri	MO	Active	
RJ 9225	Rho Phi		Kinmundy, Illinois	IL	Active	
RJ 9274	Omicron Theta		Memphis, Missouri	MO	Active	
RJ 9325	Iota Chi		Mulvane, Kansas	KS	Active	
RJ 9329	Alpha Mu Epsilon		Hallsville, Texas	TX	Active	
RJ 9425	Sigma Epsilon		Lawrenceville, Illinois	IL	Active	
RJ 9462	Eta Kappa		Crowley, Louisiana	LA	Active	
RJ 9468	Kappa Omega		Fort Branch, Indiana	IN	Active	
RJ 9478	Alpha Mu Chi		Madisonville, Texas	TX	Active	
RJ 9544	Alpha Nu Epsilon		Gilmer, Texas	TX	Active	
RJ 9567	Iota Nu		Chariton, Iowa	IA	Active	
RJ 9592	Sigma Eta		Mount Zion, Illinois	IL	Active	
RJ 9648	Alpha Mu		Preeceville, Saskatchewan, Canada	SK	Active	
RJ 9684	Zeta Psi		Manassas, Virginia	VA	Active	
RJ 9694	Kappa Kappa		Perry Lake, Kansas	KS	Active	
RJ 9695	Beta Rho		Hill City, South Dakota	SD	Active	
RJ 9721	Gamma Beta		Grangeville, Idaho	ID	Active	
RJ 9746	Lambda Nu		Mahanoy City, Pennsylvania	PA	Active	
RJ 9776	Eta Beta		Conyers, Georgia	GA	Active	
RJ 9779	Nu Alpha		Chesterland, Ohio	OH	Active	
RJ 9788	Delta Omega		Albuquerque, New Mexico	NM	Active	
RJ 9822	Eta Omicron		Ruston, Louisiana	LA	Active	
RJ 9847	Kappa Sigma		Nortonville, Kansas	KS	Active	
RJ 9860	Kappa Upsilon		Colby, Kansas	KS	Active	
RJ 9888	Pi Omicron		New Madrid, Missouri	MO	Active	
RJ 9900	Sigma Mu		Golconda, Illinois	IL	Active	
RJ 9940	Kappa Psi		Larned, Kansas	KS	Active	
RJ 9981	Pi Upsilon		Odessa, Missouri	MO	Active	
RJ 9994	Alpha Omicron Theta		Cleburne, Texas	TX	Active	
RJ 10001	Lambda Beta		Greeley, Kansas	KS	Active	
RJ 10066	Kappa Kappa		Lamoni, Iowa	IA	Active	
RJ 10077	Epsilon Upsilon		Ozark, Arkansas	AR	Active	
RJ 10163	Sigma Lambda		Inverness, Florida	FL	Active	
RJ 10190	Sigma Phi		Sesser, Illinois	IL	Active	
RJ 10202	Rho Mu		Boonville, Missouri	MO	Active	
RJ 10244	Alpha Omega		Knoxville, Tennessee	TN	Active	
RJ 10246	Eta Omicron		Washington, Georgia	GA	Active	
RJ 10252	Beta Eta		Helena, Montana	MT	Active	
RJ 10278	Zeta Nu		Sherman, Texas	TX	Active	
RJ 10317	Sigma Omega		Tavernier, Florida	FL	Active	
RJ 10324	Theta Chi		Strathroy, Ontario, Canada	ON	Active	
RJ 10335	Delta Theta Lambda		El Dorado Hills, California	CA	Active	
RJ 10346	Zeta Alpha		Sheridan, Arkansas	AR	Active	
RJ 10373	Eta Lambda		Emporia, Virginia	VA	Active	
RJ 10397	Eta Mu		Portsmouth, Virginia	VA	Active	
RJ 10422	Lambda Psi		Clearwater, Kansas	KS	Active	
RJ 10452	Delta Omicron		Janesville, Wisconsin	WI	Active	
RJ 10456	Delta Sigma		Paintsville, Kentucky	KY	Active	
RJ 10496	Alpha Rho Theta		Friendswood, Texas	TX	Active	
RJ 10501	Alpha Rho Lambda		Farwell, Texas	TX	Active	
RJ 10529	Tau Mu		Cape Coral, Florida	FL	Active	
RJ 10555	Zeta Alpha		Sutherlin, Oregon	OR	Active	
RJ 10594	Lambda Phi		Monroe City, Indiana	IN	Active	
RJ 10664	Delta Kappa		Ellisville, Mississippi	MS	Active	
RJ 10710	Lambda Chi		Fairland, Indiana	IN	Active	
RJ 10714	Sigma Xi		Doniphan, Missouri	MO	Active	
RJ 10738	Beta Psi		Volga, South Dakota	SD	Active	
RJ 10751	Kappa Mu		Miami, Oklahoma	OK	Active	
RJ 10761	Gamma Phi		Wisconsin Rapids, Wisconsin	WI	Active	
RJ 10795	Lambda Eta		Manning, Iowa	IA	Active	
RJ 10833	Mu Kappa		Ellinwood, Kansas	KS	Active	
RJ 10881	Eta Chi		Woodstock, Virginia	VA	Active	
RJ 10905	Tau Alpha		Cameron, Missouri	MO	Active	
RJ 10930	Epsilon Upsilon		Kelowna, British Columbia, Canada	BC	Active	
RJ 10935	Kappa Sigma		Duncan, Oklahoma	OK	Active	
RJ 10936	Kappa Tau		Edmond, Oklahoma	OK	Active	
RJ 10967	Zeta Omicron		Salem, Arkansas	AR	Active	
RJ 10989	Mu Gamma		Tell City, Indiana	IN	Active	
RJ 10991	Theta Mu		Forest City, North Carolina	NC	Active	
RJ 11003	Tau Pi		Sterling, Illinois	IL	Active	
RJ 11032	Theta Gamma		Virginia Beach, Virginia	VA	Active	
RJ 11043	Theta Theta		Peachtree City, Georgia	GA	Active	
RJ 11066	Lambda Beta		Prague, Oklahoma	OK	Active	
RJ 11167	Iota Omicron		Elliot Lake, Ontario, Canada	ON	Active	
RJ 11176	Omega		Waterloo, Iowa	IA	Active	
RJ 11187	Delta Omega		Danville, Kentucky	KY	Active	
RJ 11206	Mu Tau		Augusta, Kansas	KS	Active	
RJ 11249	Alpha Upsilon Phi		Ballinger, Texas	TX	Active	
RJ 11253	Zeta Beta		Hueytown, Alabama	AL	Active	
RJ 11294	Lambda Phi		Walcott, Iowa	IA	Active	
RJ 11319	Alpha Phi Kappa		Palestine, Texas	TX	Active	
RJ 11367	Iota Phi		Port Elgin, Ontario, Canada	ON	Active	
RJ 11398	Eta Lambda		Elgin, Illinois	IL	Active	
RJ 11435	Alpha Chi Epsilon		Rio Grande City, Texas	TX	Active	
RJ 11455	Zeta Alpha		Alma, Nebraska	NE	Active	
RJ 11503	Chi		Shoal Lake, Manitoba, Canada	MB	Active	
RJ 11514	Theta Kappa		Williamsburg, Virginia	VA	Active	
RJ 11572	Theta Mu		Dowagiac, Michigan	MI	Active	
RJ 11626	Theta Sigma		Snellville, Georgia	GA	Active	
RJ 11634	Alpha Psi Beta		Lockhart, Texas	TX	Active	
RJ 11651	Alpha Theta		Douglas, Georgia	GA	Active	
RJ 11747	Nu Eta		Pittsburg, Kansas	KS	Active	
RJ 11760	Lambda Psi		Guymon, Oklahoma	OK	Active	
RJ 11813	Upsilon Mu		La Plata, Missouri	MO	Active	
RJ 11837	Upsilon Nu		Versailles, Missouri	MO	Active	
RJ 11840	Nu Mu		Salina, Kansas	KS	Active	
RJ 11863	Gamma Sigma		Green Valley, Arizona	AZ	Active	
RJ 11890	Alpha Omega Rho		San Isidro, Texas	TX	Active	
RJ 11947	Delta		Seattle, Washington	WA	Active	
RJ 12003	Alpha Pi		Natchitoches Parish, Louisiana	LA	Active	
RJ 12007	Zeta Kappa		Red Oak, Iowa	IA	Active	
RJ 12027	Mu Tau		Huxley, Iowa	IA	Active	
RJ 12032	Chi Sigma		Tavernier, Florida	FL	Active	
RJ 12060	Eta Mu		De Queen, Arkansas	AR	Active	
RJ 12125	Theta Delta		McKenzie, Tennessee	TN	Active	
RJ 12132	Alpha		Springfield, Missouri	MO	Active	
RJ 12155	Eta Delta		Mackenzie, British Columbia, Canada	BC	Active	
RJ 12163	Delta Iota Omega		Ripon, California	CA	Active	
RJ 12234	Chi Psi		Orange Park, Florida	FL	Active	
RJ 12354	Eta Rho		Clarksville, Arkansas	AR	Active	
RJ 12383	Delta Kappa Iota		Live Oak, California	CA	Active	
RJ 12454	Upsilon Sigma		St. Elmo, Illinois	IL	Active	
RJ 12460	Alpha Alpha		Ocean View, Delaware	DE	Active	
RJ 12499	Alpha Rho		Havana, Illinois	IL	Active	
RJ 12505	Chi Nu		Pleasant Hill, Missouri	MO	Active	
RJ 12546	Nu Beta		State Center, Iowa	IA	Active	
RJ 12609	Iota Iota		Blairsville, Georgia	GA	Active	
RJ 12739	Chi Omega		Buckner, Missouri	MO	Active	
RJ 12753	Gamma Theta		Fitchburg, Massachusetts	MA	Active	
RJ 12777	Mu Upsilon		Muskegon, Michigan	MI	Active	
RJ 12797	Psi Theta		Polo, Missouri	MO	Active	
RJ 12871	Nu Zeta		Walcott, Iowa	IA	Active	
RJ 12902	Beta Delta Rho		Abilene, Texas	TX	Active	
RJ 12910	Beta Delta Sigma		Sunray, Texas	TX	Active	
RJ 12913	Kappa Alpha		Blairsville, Georgia	GA	Active	
RJ 12928	Iota Omega		Natchitoches, Louisiana	LA	Active	
RJ 12966	Gamma Tau		Bowie, Maryland	MD	Active	
RJ 12976	Nu Theta		Marshalltown, Iowa	IA	Active	
RJ 12980	Zeta Alpha		Marion, Kentucky	KY	Active	
RJ 12985	Omega Upsilon		Appleton City, Missouri	MO	Active	
RJ 12988	Chi Zeta		Carbondale, Illinois	IL	Active	
RJ 13001	Beta Phi		Westlock, Alberta, Canada	AB	Active	
RJ 13015	Alpha		Old Town, Maine	ME	Active	
RJ 13035	Theta Psi		Cookeville, Tennessee	TN	Active	
RJ 13053	Alpha Psi		Puyallup, Washington	WA	Active	
RJ 13064	Beta		Des Moines, Iowa	IA	Active	
RJ 13093	Chi Theta		Paris, Illinois	IL	Active	
RJ 13118	Beta Epsilon Lambda		Claude, Texas	TX	Active	
RJ 13130	Epsilon Phi		Hobbs, New Mexico	NM	Active	
RJ 13152	Delta Nu		Barnstable, Massachusetts	MA	Active	
RJ 13165	Beta Omega		Scottsbluff, Nebraska	NE	Active	
RJ 13170	Alpha Alpha Chi		Richmond, Missouri	MO	Active	
RJ 13258	Mu Omega		Tahlequah, Oklahoma	OK	Active	
RJ 13281	Omicron Chi		Liberal, Kansas	KS	Active	
RJ 13345	Iota Rho		Huntersville, North Carolina	NC	Active	
RJ 13377	Pi Zeta		Olathe, Kansas	KS	Active	
RJ 13389	Beta Zeta Omicron		Rio Grande City, Texas	TX	Active	
RJ 13444	Zeta Zeta		Farmington, New Mexico	NM	Active	
RJ 13473	Epsilon Gamma		Woodruff, Wisconsin	WI	Active	
RJ 13498	Kappa Nu		Luling, Louisiana	LA	Active	
RJ 13512	Beta Eta Iota		Kempner, Texas	TX	Active	
RJ 13520	Gamma Zeta		Camrose, Alberta, Canada	AB	Active	
RJ 13528	Eta Lambda		Springfield, Colorado	CO	Active	
RJ 13541	Rho Iota		Hiawatha, Kansas	KS	Active	
RJ 13549	Alpha Delta Xi		Centralia, Missouri	MO	Active	
RJ 13553	Gamma Chi		Rockville, Maryland	MD	Active	
RJ 13604	Delta Lambda Omicron		Santa Clarita, California	CA	Active	
RJ 13611	Omicron Zeta		Atlantic, Iowa	IA	Active	
RJ 13626	Zeta Xi		Omaha, Nebraska	NE	Active	
RJ 13651	Gamma Upsilon		Ocean Pines, Maryland	MD	Active	
RJ 13700	Zeta Phi		Monroeville, Alabama	AL	Active	
RJ 13701	Beta Eta Tau		Rio Grande City, Texas	TX	Active	
RJ 13757	Beta Theta Iota		Rio Grande City, Texas	TX	Active	
RJ 13770	Beta Theta Lambda		Rio Grande City, Texas	TX	Active	
RJ 13796	Tau Omega		Parma, Ohio	OH	Active	
RJ 13811	Alpha Delta Rho		Chillicothe, Missouri	MO	Active	
RJ 13824	Zeta Theta		Hobbs, New Mexico	NM	Active	
RJ 13833	Gamma Beta		Oak Grove, Missouri	MO	Active	
RJ 13866	Beta Theta Omega		El Campo, Texas	TX	Active	
RJ 13871	Gamma Mu		Lusby, Maryland	MD	Active	
RJ 13874	Eta Delta		Newport, Oregon	OR	Active	
RJ 13883	Mu Zeta		Tillsonburg, Ontario, Canada	ON	Active	
RJ 13901	Delta Mu Epsilon		Vacaville, California	CA	Active	
RJ 13930	Alpha Epsilon Beta		Lexington, Missouri	MO	Active	
RJ 13982	Theta Pi		Kelowna, British Columbia, Canada	BC	Active	
RJ 13985	Kappa Kappa		Baytown, Texas	TX	Active	
RJ 13997	Psi Eta		Metropolis, Illinois	IL	Active	
RJ 14025	Beta Iota Pi		Pasadena, Texas	TX	Active	
RJ 14043	Epsilon Zeta		Madison, Wisconsin	WI	Active	
RJ 14076	Alpha		Cheyenne, Wyoming	WY	Active	
RJ 14089	Theta Omicron		Clarksville, Arkansas	AR	Active	
RJ 14091	Alpha Gamma		Grantham, New Hampshire	NH	Active	
RJ 14100	Delta Omicron		Winchendon, Massachusetts	MA	Active	
RJ 14109	Upsilon Iota		Mount Vernon, Ohio	OH	Active	
RJ 14129	Sigma Alpha		Liberal, Kansas	KS	Active	
RJ 14160	Theta Pi		Hot Springs National Park, Arkansas	AR	Active	
RJ 14175	Beta Kappa Delta		Baytown, Texas	TX	Active	
RJ 14178	Nu Alpha		Gainesville, Florida	FL	Active	
RJ 14183	Eta Nu		Mobile, Alabama	AL	Active	
RJ 14196	Alpha Delta		Portland, Oregon	OR	Active	
RJ 14239	Alpha Epsilon Psi		Linn, Missouri	MO	Active	
RJ 14314	Alpha Rho		Virginia Beach, Virginia	VA	Active	
RJ 14323	Lambda		Kingston, Ontario, Canada	ON	Active	
RJ 14358	Zeta		Bucerias, Nayarit, Mexico	Nayarit	Active	
RJ 14368	Beta Kappa Sigma		Hilltop Lakes, Texas	TX	Active	
RJ 14392	Gamma Epsilon		St. George, Utah	UT	Active	
RJ 14401	Pi Lambda		Blue Springs, Missouri	MO	Active	
RJ 14403	Beta Kappa Upsilon		San Marcos, Texas	TX	Active	
RJ 14429	Delta Gamma		Littleton, Colorado	CO	Active	
RJ 14434	Alpha Gamma Gamma		Clermont, Florida	FL	Active	
RJ 14443	Iota Rho		Nashville, Tennessee	TN	Active	
RJ 14447	Upsilon Omicron		Chillicothe, Ohio	OH	Active	
RJ 14458	Alpha Gamma Delta		North Fort Myers, Florida	FL	Active	
RJ 14465	Iota Sigma		Athens, Tennessee	TN	Active	
RJ 14490	Sigma Nu		Liberal, Kansas	KS	Active	
RJ 14528	Delta Nu Omega		Shingle Springs, California	CA	Active	
RJ 14539	Alpha		Sandpoint, Idaho	ID	Active	
RJ 14541	Sigma Xi		Arroyo Grande, California	CA	Active	
RJ 14548	Beta Sigma		Lexington, Kentucky	KY	Active	
RJ 14550	Alpha Mu		Winslow, Maine	ME	Active	
RJ 14570	Alpha Gamma Nu		North Fort Myers, Florida	FL	Active	
RJ 14590	Kappa Omicron		Fayetteville, North Carolina	NC	Active	
RJ 14595	Delta Omicron		Weiser, Idaho	ID	Active	
RJ 14610	Beta Lambda Kappa		Baytown, Texas	TX	Active	
RJ 14614	Alpha		Sparks, Nevada	NV	Active	
RJ 14622	Beta Lambda Lambda		Humble, Texas	TX	Active	
RJ 14625	Alpha Gamma Chi		The Villages, Florida	FL	Active	
RJ 14631	Alpha		Columbia, South Carolina	SC	Active	
RJ 14634	Theta Gamma		Baytown, Texas	TX	Active	
RJ 14635	Delta Epsilon		Sykesville, Maryland	MD	Active	
RJ 14637	Sigma Upsilon		Ottawa, Kansas	KS	Active	
RJ 14651	Epsilon Mu		Greenwood Village, Colorado	CO	Active	
RJ 14654	Beta Omicron		Regina, Saskatchewan, Canada	SK	Active	
RJ 14658	Alpha Delta Alpha		North Fort Myers, Florida	FL	Active	
RJ 14669	Epsilon Eta		Saint Paul, Minnesota	MN	Active	
RJ 14674	Lambda Alpha		Newnan, Georgia	GA	Active	
RJ 14675	Lambda Beta		Newnan, Georgia	GA	Active	
RJ 14704	Alpha Xi		Columbia, South Carolina	SC	Active	
RJ 14710	Alpha Pi		Kamloops, British Columbia, Canada	BC	Active	
RJ 14711	Epsilon		Winchester, Virginia	VA	Active	
RJ 14713	Alpha Psi		Devils Lake, North Dakota	ND	Active	
RJ 14716	Alpha Omicron		Seneca, South Carolina	SC	Active	
RJ 14719	Zeta Lambda		Elwood, Indiana	IN	Active	
RJ 14744	Gamma Omega		Beaverton, Oregon	OR	Active	
RJ 14748	Lambda Theta		Belle Chasse, Louisiana	LA	Active	
RJ 14749	Alpha Delta Lambda		The Villages, Florida	FL	Active	
RJ 14755	Alpha Delta Mu		North Fort Myers, Florida	FL	Active	
RJ 14766	Delta Omicron		Lake Havasu City, Arizona	AZ	Active	
RJ 14767	Eta Zeta		Muskegon, Michigan	MI	Active	
RJ 14782	Alpha		ʻEwa Beach, Hawaii	HI	Active	
RJ 14783	Lambda Kappa		Breaux Bridge, Louisiana	LA	Active	
RJ 14786	Alpha Omega		Albuquerque, New Mexico	NM	Active	
RJ 14792	Delta Xi Zeta		Valley Springs, California	CA	Active	
RJ 14807	Theta Omega		Turlock, California	CA	Active	
RJ 14817	Epsilon Xi		Starkville, Mississippi	MS	Active	
RJ 14818	Epsilon Theta		Rock Hill, South Carolina	SC	Active	
RJ 14831	Lambda Lambda		Lafayette, Louisiana	LA	Active	
RJ 14833	Mu		Juneau, Alaska	AK	Active	
RJ 14836	Epsilon Kappa		Travelers Rest, South Carolina	SC	Active	
RJ 14838	Alpha Upsilon		Waiʻanae, Hawaii	HI	Active	
RJ 14842	Psi Upsilon		Litchfield, Illinois	IL	Active	
RJ 14849	Alpha		Sioux Falls, South Dakota	SD	Active	
RJ 14851	Delta Zeta		Odenton, Maryland	MD	Active	
RJ 14864	Kappa Rho		Spencerport, New York	NY	Active	
RJ 14873	Alpha Gamma		Fort Saskatchewan, Alberta, Canada	AB	Active	
RJ 14883	Kappa Zeta		Virginia Beach, Virginia	VA	Active	
RJ 14891	Alpha Eta Kappa		Cameron, Missouri	MO	Active	
RJ 14892	Beta Mu Theta		Baytown, Texas	TX	Active	
RJ 14899	Kappa Tau		Gastonia, North Carolina	NC	Active	
RJ 14907	Kappa Rho		Elizabeth, Colorado	CO	Active	
RJ 14913	Theta		Nuevo Vallarta, Nayarit, Mexico	Nayrit	Active	
RJ 14917	Lambda Pi		Covington, Louisiana	LA	Active	
RJ 14924	Delta Xi Iota		Beaumont, California	CA	Active	
RJ 14926	Alpha Omega		Devils Lake, North Dakota	ND	Active	
RJ 14929	Zeta Kappa		Paris, Kentucky	KY	Active	
RJ 14933	Epsilon Lambda		Orangeburg, South Carolina	SC	Active	
RJ 14934	Eta Kappa		Socorro, New Mexico	NM	Active	
RJ 14935	Zeta Iota		Elizabethtown, Kentucky	KY	Active	
RJ 14939	Gamma Xi		Hill City, South Dakota	SD	Active	
RJ 14943	Alpha Eta Omicron		Blue Springs, Missouri	MO	Active	
RJ 14950	Delta Zeta		Lawrenceville, Georgia	GA	Active	
RJ 14957	Epsilon Kappa		Virginia, Minnesota	MN	Active	
RJ 14959	Alpha Eta Sigma		Blue Springs, Missouri	MO	Active	
RJ 14960	Alpha Delta Psi		Cape Coral, Florida	FL	Active	
RJ 14962	Theta Tau		Sequim, Washington	WA	Active	
RJ 14970	Alpha Eta Tau		Lake Winnebago, Missouri	MO	Active	
RJ 14973	Theta Omega		Olympia, Washington	WA	Active	
RJ 14974	Beta		Casper, Wyoming	WY	Active	
RJ 14976	Alpha Epsilon Alpha		Ocala, Florida	FL	Active	
RJ 14980	Sigma Alpha		Philadelphia, Pennsylvania	PA	Active	
RJ 14981	Theta Pi		Marietta, Georgia	GA	Active	
RJ 14982	Delta Xi Lambda		Plumas Lake, California	CA	Active	
RJ 14999	Omicron Omicron		Coyle, Oklahoma	OK	Active	
RJ 15000	Alpha Delta Theta		Katy, Texas	TX	Active	
RJ 15003	Beta Mu Iota		Abilene, Texas	TX	Active	
RJ 15004	Omega Alpha		Surrey, British Columbia, Canada	BC	Active	
RJ 15005	Alpha Epsilon Zeta		Ruskin, Florida	FL	Active	
RJ 15006	Gamma Delta Xi		Boerne, Texas	TX	Active	
RJ 15008	Theta Zeta		Mobile, Alabama	AL	Active	
RJ 15009	Omega Beta		Chilliwack, British Columbia, Canada	BC	Active	
RJ 15010	Epsilon Lambda		St. Cloud, Minnesota	MN	Active	
RJ 15011	Beta Beta		Ocean View, Delaware	DE	Active	
RJ 15012	Epsilon Sigma		Charleston, South Carolina	SC	Active	
RJ 15013	Alpha Omega		Greers Ferry, Arkansas	AR	Active	
RJ 15015	Delta Gamma		Lake Winnebago, Missouri	MO	Active	
RJ 15016	Nu Mu		Windsor, Ontario, Canada	ON	Active	
RJ 15017	Kappa Phi		Oneonta, New York	NY	Active	
RJ 15018	Epsilon Xi		Eastover, South Carolina	SC	Active	
RJ 15020	Eta Pi		Yorktown, Virginia	VA	Active	
RJ 15021	Beta Kappa Gamma		Boerne, Texas	TX	Active	
RJ 15022	Eta Nu		Socorro, New Mexico	NM	Active	
RJ 15023	Alpha Omega		Portland, Oregon	OR	Active	
RJ 15024	Gamma Psi		St. Petersburg, Florida	FL	Active	
RJ 15025	Alpha Tau		Charleston, South Carolina	SC	Active	
RJ 97000	Honorary Members		Kansas City, Missouri	MO	Active	
RJ 98000	International Honorary Members		Kansas City, Missouri	MO	Active	
RJ 99901	Members Without Chapter		Kansas City, Missouri	MO	Active	

=== Exemplar chapters ===
The exemplar degree is awarded to members who have spent four years completing the Ritual of Jewels Manual. Following are the active Exemplar chapters of Beta Sigma Phi as of 2026.

Number	Chapter	Charter date and range	Location	State or province	Status	Ref.
EX 100	Xi Alpha	1944	Danville, Illinois	IL	Active	
EX 104	Xi Alpha		Albuquerque, New Mexico	NM	Active	
EX 105	Xi Beta		Boone, Iowa	IA	Active	
EX 122	Xi Beta		Wichita, Kansas	KS	Active	
EX 124	Xi Alpha		Oklahoma City, Oklahoma	OK	Active	
EX 125	Xi Alpha		La Junta, Colorado	CO	Active	
EX 126	Xi Eta		Salem, Illinois	IL	Active	
EX 141	Xi Alpha		Fargo, North Dakota	ND	Active	
EX 149	Xi Beta		Houston, Texas	TX	Active	
EX 154	Xi Gamma		Pierre, South Dakota	SD	Active	
EX 156	Xi Eta		Sioux City, Iowa	IA	Active	
EX 183	Xi Beta		Yakima, Washington	WA	Active	
EX 185	Xi Alpha		Winnipeg, Manitoba, Canada	MB	Active	
EX 194	Xi Alpha		Portland, Oregon	OR	Active	
EX 202	Xi Zeta		Austin, Texas	TX	Active	
EX 216	Xi Delta		Vincennes, Indiana	IN	Active	
EX 217	Xi Gamma		St. Joseph, Missouri	MO	Active	
EX 219	Xi Phi		Champaign, Illinois	IL	Active	
EX 223	Xi Zeta		Denver, Colorado	CO	Active	
EX 226	Xi Delta		Detroit, Michigan	MI	Active	
EX 228	Xi Beta		Syracuse, New York	NY	Active	
EX 233	Xi Alpha		Pocatello, Idaho	ID	Active	
EX 241	Xi Beta		Boise, Idaho	ID	Active	
EX 246	Xi Delta		Morgantown, West Virginia	WV	Active	
EX 248	Xi Epsilon		Warsaw, Indiana	IN	Active	
EX 253	Xi Alpha		Little Rock, Arkansas	AR	Active	
EX 254	Xi Chi		Harrisburg, Illinois	IL	Active	
EX 269	Xi Kappa		Dayton, Ohio	OH	Active	
EX 276	Xi Alpha Alpha		Havana, Illinois	IL	Active	
EX 281	Xi Theta		New Albany, Indiana	IN	Active	
EX 289	Xi Alpha		Globe, Arizona	AZ	Active	
EX 290	Xi Beta		Winchester, Virginia	VA	Active	
EX 303	Xi Iota		Indianapolis, Indiana	IN	Active	
EX 326	Xi Zeta		Boulder City, Nevada	NV	Active	
EX 335	Xi Iota		Poughkeepsie, New York	NY	Active	
EX 338	Xi Theta		Tonopah, Nevada	NV	Active	
EX 341	Xi Alpha Zeta		Ottawa, Illinois	IL	Active	
EX 346	Xi Beta		Phoenix, Arizona	AZ	Active	
EX 361	Xi Alpha Iota		Clinton, Illinois	IL	Active	
EX 366	Xi Mu		Buena Vista, Colorado	CO	Active	
EX 389	Xi Gamma		Worcester, Massachusetts	MA	Active	
EX 391	Xi Nu		Evansville, Indiana	IN	Active	
EX 392	Xi Gamma		New Westminster, British Columbia, Canada	BC	Active	
EX 395	Xi Gamma		Baton Rouge, Louisiana	LA	Active	
EX 425	Xi Omega		Cleveland, Ohio	OH	Active	
EX 427	Xi Beta		Bath, Maine	ME	Active	
EX 441	Xi Alpha		Montreal, Quebec, Canada	QC	Active	
EX 457	Xi Alpha Xi		Du Quoin, Illinois	IL	Active	
EX 478	Xi Alpha Sigma		Watseka, Illinois	IL	Active	
EX 494	Xi Iota		Port Angeles, Washington	WA	Active	
EX 496	Xi Beta		Columbus, Georgia	GA	Active	
EX 497	Xi Sigma		Glenwood Springs, Colorado	CO	Active	
EX 500	Xi Beta		Springdale, Arkansas	AR	Active	
EX 501	Xi Alpha Alpha		Bakersfield, California	CA	Active	
EX 516	Xi Delta		Ponca City, Oklahoma	OK	Active	
EX 518	Xi Zeta		The Dalles, Oregon	OR	Active	
EX 541	Xi Iota		Keyser, West Virginia	WV	Active	
EX 547	Xi Sigma		Knoxville, Iowa	IA	Active	
EX 549	Xi Xi		Salina, Kansas	KS	Active	
EX 554	Xi Eta		La Grande, Oregon	OR	Active	
EX 569	Xi Gamma		Hagerstown, Maryland	MD	Active	
EX 578	Xi Gamma		Winnipeg, Manitoba, Canada	MB	Active	
EX 591	Xi Alpha Lambda		Mansfield, Ohio	OH	Active	
EX 594	Xi Rho		Buffalo, New York	NY	Active	
EX 622	Xi Pi		Pittsburg, Kansas	KS	Active	
EX 626	Xi Phi		Council Bluffs, Iowa	IA	Active	
EX 641	Xi Zeta		Yuma, Arizona	AZ	Active	
EX 709	Xi Alpha Sigma		Ashland, Ohio	OH	Active	
EX 712	Xi Alpha Eta		New Braunfels, Texas	TX	Active	
EX 723	Xi Alpha Theta		Harlingen, Texas	TX	Active	
EX 737	Xi Alpha		Jackson, Mississippi	MS	Active	
EX 740	Xi Iota		Sidney, Nebraska	NE	Active	
EX 744	Xi Nu		Las Vegas, Nevada	NV	Active	
EX 749	Xi Xi		St. Catharines, Ontario, Canada	ON	Active	
EX 752	Xi Beta Alpha		Santa Ana, California	CA	Active	
EX 757	Xi Upsilon		Springfield, Missouri	MO	Active	
EX 782	Xi Theta		Bartlesville, Oklahoma	OK	Active	
EX 783	Xi Chi		Jefferson City, Missouri	MO	Active	
EX 792	Xi Iota		Cushing, Oklahoma	OK	Active	
EX 794	Xi Alpha Iota		Lancaster, Pennsylvania	PA	Active	
EX 798	Xi Theta		Staunton, Virginia	VA	Active	
EX 799	Xi Lambda		Salem, Oregon	OR	Active	
EX 810	Xi Alpha Alpha		Binghamton, New York	NY	Active	
EX 813	Xi Eta		Sandpoint, Idaho	ID	Active	
EX 818	Xi Theta		Socorro, New Mexico	NM	Active	
EX 820	Xi Alpha Epsilon		Jeffersonville, Indiana	IN	Active	
EX 825	Xi Theta		Salt Lake City, Utah	UT	Active	
EX 833	Xi Alpha Nu		San Angelo, Texas	TX	Active	
EX 834	Xi Alpha Xi		San Marcos, Texas	TX	Active	
EX 837	Xi Kappa		Roswell, New Mexico	NM	Active	
EX 845	Xi Delta		Portage la Prairie, Manitoba, Canada	MB	Active	
EX 849	Xi Zeta		Torrington, Connecticut	CT	Active	
EX 850	Xi Lambda		Portales, New Mexico	NM	Active	
EX 857	Xi Alpha Sigma		Amarillo, Texas	TX	Active	
EX 862	Xi Omega		Cedar Falls, Iowa	IA	Active	
EX 876	Xi Beta Xi		San Diego, California	CA	Active	
EX 880	Xi Beta Beta		Lorain, Ohio	OH	Active	
EX 911	Xi Iota		Lewiston, Idaho	ID	Active	
EX 917	Xi Alpha Omega		Austin, Texas	TX	Active	
EX 931	Xi Eta		Tucson, Arizona	AZ	Active	
EX 932	Xi Alpha Zeta		Dunkirk, New York	NY	Active	
EX 946	Xi Xi		Fairbury, Nebraska	NE	Active	
EX 948	Xi Beta		Jackson, Mississippi	MS	Active	
EX 949	Xi Alpha Epsilon		Charles City, Iowa	IA	Active	
EX 953	Xi Theta		Greenville, South Carolina	SC	Active	
EX 963	Xi Pi		Las Vegas, Nevada	NV	Active	
EX 970	Xi Alpha Delta		Excelsior Springs, Missouri	MO	Active	
EX 990	Xi Beta Theta		Greenville, Texas	TX	Active	
EX 997	Xi Beta Kappa		Houston, Texas	TX	Active	
EX 999	Xi Xi		Tallahassee, Florida	FL	Active	
EX 1031	Xi Epsilon		Sheridan, Wyoming	WY	Active	
EX 1034	Xi Alpha Zeta		Wichita, Kansas	KS	Active	
EX 1060	Xi Alpha Psi		Sunbury, Pennsylvania	PA	Active	
EX 1064	Xi Pi		North Platte, Nebraska	NE	Active	
EX 1065	Xi Iota	1942	Butte, Montana	MT	Active	
	Xi Lambda	1954	Butte, Montana	MT	Inactive	
EX 1066	Xi Alpha Lambda		Peru, Indiana	IN	Active	
EX 1074	Xi Alpha Zeta		Sterling, Colorado	CO	Active	
EX 1085	Xi Alpha Mu		Terre Haute, Indiana	IN	Active	
EX 1091	Xi Upsilon		Pensacola Beach, Florida	FL	Active	
EX 1092	Xi Sigma		Blackwell, Oklahoma	OK	Active	
EX 1109	Xi Alpha Omicron		Elkhart, Indiana	IN	Active	
EX 1116	Xi Alpha Pi		Evansville, Indiana	IN	Active	
EX 1126	Xi Tau		Fort Frances, Ontario, Canada	ON	Active	
EX 1129	Xi Chi		Aberdeen, Washington	WA	Active	
EX 1130	Xi Sigma		Arlington, Virginia	VA	Active	
EX 1136	Xi Alpha Kappa		Watertown, New York	NY	Active	
EX 1138	Xi Tau		Radford, Virginia	VA	Active	
EX 1150	Xi Nu		Los Alamos, New Mexico	NM	Active	
EX 1168	Xi Phi		Richmond, Virginia	VA	Active	
EX 1173	Xi Upsilon		Thunder Bay, Ontario, Canada	ON	Active	
EX 1184	Xi Chi		Sophia, West Virginia	WV	Active	
EX 1192	Xi Beta Epsilon		Pottsville, Pennsylvania	PA	Active	
EX 1197	Xi Pi		Tooele, Utah	UT	Active	
EX 1206	Xi Gamma Kappa		Carterville, Illinois	IL	Active	
EX 1209	Xi Alpha Xi		Boone, Iowa	IA	Active	
EX 1211	Xi Chi		Ottawa, Ontario, Canada	ON	Active	
EX 1217	Xi Psi		Chester, Virginia	VA	Active	
EX 1220	Xi Lambda		Rogers, Arkansas	AR	Active	
EX 1227	Xi Theta		Annapolis, Maryland	MD	Active	
EX 1237	Xi Gamma Beta		Beaumont, Texas	TX	Active	
EX 1245	Xi Gamma Delta		Findlay, Ohio	OH	Active	
EX 1259	Xi Alpha Omicron		Wellsville, New York	NY	Active	
EX 1266	Xi Alpha Kappa		Chillicothe, Missouri	MO	Active	
EX 1295	Xi Alpha Delta		Lake Wales, Florida	FL	Active	
EX 1324	Xi Alpha Beta		Burlington, Ontario, Canada	ON	Active	
EX 1326	Xi Beta Lambda		Chambersburg, Pennsylvania	PA	Active	
EX 1335	Xi Psi		Potter, Nebraska	NE	Active	
EX 1346	Xi Eta		McComb, Mississippi	MS	Active	
EX 1355	Xi Gamma Nu		Richardson, Texas	TX	Active	
EX 1383	Xi Alpha Zeta		North Bay, Ontario, Canada	ON	Active	
EX 1384	Xi Iota		Lafayette, Louisiana	LA	Active	
EX 1387	Xi Alpha Theta		Sudbury, Ontario, Canada	ON	Active	
EX 1393	Xi Alpha Omicron		Ann Arbor, Michigan	MI	Active	
EX 1406	Xi Delta Lambda		Susanville, California	CA	Active	
EX 1412	Xi Delta Mu		Riverside, California	CA	Active	
EX 1419	Xi Pi		Moscow, Idaho	ID	Active	
EX 1420	Xi Nu		Victoria, British Columbia, Canada	BC	Active	
EX 1423	Xi Alpha Zeta		Seattle, Washington	WA	Active	
EX 1430	Xi Gamma Rho		Alice, Texas	TX	Active	
EX 1441	Xi Gamma Kappa		Bowling Green, Ohio	OH	Active	
EX 1453	Xi Pi		Roswell, New Mexico	NM	Active	
EX 1468	Xi Gamma Chi		Baytown, Texas	TX	Active	
EX 1473	Xi Alpha Tau		Alamosa, Colorado	CO	Active	
EX 1479	Xi Alpha Rho		Winfield, Kansas	KS	Active	
EX 1480	Xi Gamma Omicron		Park Forest, Illinois	IL	Active	
EX 1481	Xi Delta Beta		McAllen, Texas	TX	Active	
EX 1522	Xi Eta		Saskatoon, Saskatchewan, Canada	SK	Active	
EX 1524	Xi Chi		Fallon, Nevada	NV	Active	
EX 1531	Xi Omicron		Whitefish, Montana	MT	Active	
EX 1540	Xi Alpha Chi		Eldon, Missouri	MO	Active	
EX 1546	Xi Alpha Tau		Knoxville, Iowa	IA	Active	
EX 1551	Xi Alpha Upsilon		Garner, Iowa	IA	Active	
EX 1556	Xi Iota		Lethbridge, Alberta, Canada	AB	Active	
EX 1561	Xi Gamma Omicron		Troy, Ohio	OH	Active	
EX 1589	Xi Alpha Gamma		Beckley, West Virginia	WV	Active	
EX 1629	Xi Mu		Walterboro, South Carolina	SC	Active	
EX 1661	Xi Alpha Chi		Fort Lauderdale, Florida	FL	Active	
EX 1680	Xi Mu		Shreveport, Louisiana	LA	Active	
EX 1683	Xi Theta		Moose Jaw, Saskatchewan, Canada	SK	Active	
EX 1695	Xi Alpha Lambda		Spokane, Washington	WA	Active	
EX 1705	Xi Zeta		Brandon, Manitoba, Canada	MB	Active	
EX 1711	Xi Zeta Alpha		Ukiah, California	CA	Active	
EX 1724	Xi Alpha Delta		Lincoln, Nebraska	NE	Active	
EX 1729	Xi Epsilon Alpha		Hereford, Texas	TX	Active	
EX 1730	Xi Beta Sigma		Middleburg, Pennsylvania	PA	Active	
EX 1735	Xi Beta Eta		Greencastle, Indiana	IN	Active	
EX 1737	Xi Epsilon Beta		Abilene, Texas	TX	Active	
EX 1750	Xi Delta Alpha		Mounds, Illinois	IL	Active	
EX 1775	Xi Zeta Kappa		Alturas, California	CA	Active	
EX 1777	Xi Zeta Lambda		Torrance, California	CA	Active	
EX 1787	Xi Epsilon Eta		Weslaco, Texas	TX	Active	
EX 1790	Xi Alpha Eta		Princeton, West Virginia	WV	Active	
EX 1795	Xi Alpha Alpha		Greensboro, North Carolina	NC	Active	
EX 1800	Xi Epsilon Theta		Odessa, Texas	TX	Active	
EX 1809	Xi Beta Phi		Corry, Pennsylvania	PA	Active	
EX 1813	Xi Alpha Epsilon		Atlanta, Georgia	GA	Active	
EX 1817	Xi Beta Zeta		Bradenton, Florida	FL	Active	
EX 1838	Xi Alpha Rho		Wenatchee, Washington	WA	Active	
EX 1850	Xi Delta Nu		Mount Vernon, Ohio	OH	Active	
EX 1855	Xi Alpha Zeta		Decatur, Georgia	GA	Active	
EX 1865	Xi Alpha Sigma		Vancouver, Washington	WA	Active	
EX 1871	Xi Delta Theta		Taylorville, Illinois	IL	Active	
EX 1881	Xi Beta Eta		Emporia, Kansas	KS	Active	
EX 1890	Xi Kappa		Rawlins, Wyoming	WY	Active	
EX 1894	Xi Alpha Xi		Brantford, Ontario, Canada	ON	Active	
EX 1896	Xi Beta Gamma		Clare, Michigan	MI	Active	
EX 1917	Xi Alpha Upsilon		Olympia, Washington	WA	Active	
EX 1923	Xi Sigma		Fort Smith, Arkansas	AR	Active	
EX 1927	Xi Epsilon Omega		Seguin, Texas	TX	Active	
EX 1930	Xi Phi		Lewiston, Idaho	ID	Active	
EX 1935	Xi Beta Mu		Butler, Missouri	MO	Active	
EX 1941	Xi Xi		Alexander City, Alabama	AL	Active	
EX 1942	Xi Beta Nu		Naples, Florida	FL	Active	
EX 1944	Xi Alpha Eta		Aztec, New Mexico	NM	Active	
EX 1950	Xi Beta Iota		Leavenworth, Kansas	KS	Active	
EX 1953	Xi Alpha Iota		Okmulgee, Oklahoma	OK	Active	
EX 1978	Xi Beta Xi		Ocala, Florida	FL	Active	
EX 1987	Xi Delta Nu		Litchfield, Illinois	IL	Active	
EX 1996	Xi Beta Xi		Paris, Missouri	MO	Active	
EX 1997	Xi Beta Lambda		Derby, Kansas	KS	Active	
EX 2014	Xi Eta Mu		Sunnyvale, California	CA	Active	
EX 2024	Xi Beta Pi		Niceville, Florida	FL	Active	
EX 2031	Xi Gamma Alpha		Franklin, Pennsylvania	PA	Active	
EX 2041	Xi Alpha Chi		Kent, Washington	WA	Active	
EX 2043	Xi Zeta Lambda		Fort Stockton, Texas	TX	Active	
EX 2047	Xi Zeta Mu		Borger, Texas	TX	Active	
EX 2049	Xi Eta Sigma		San Diego, California	CA	Active	
EX 2051	Xi Beta Tau		Pahokee, Florida	FL	Active	
EX 2057	Xi Alpha Kappa		Guymon, Oklahoma	OK	Active	
EX 2070	Xi Beta Upsilon		Madison, Indiana	IN	Active	
EX 2071	Xi Zeta Xi		La Porte, Texas	TX	Active	
EX 2094	Xi Beta Nu		Des Moines, Iowa	IA	Active	
EX 2104	Xi Alpha Rho		Kitchener, Ontario, Canada	ON	Active	
EX 2120	Xi Beta Beta		Englewood, Colorado	CO	Active	
EX 2163	Xi Omega		Burley, Idaho	ID	Active	
EX 2164	Xi Rho		Kenosha, Wisconsin	WI	Active	
EX 2166	Xi Beta Chi		Terre Haute, Indiana	IN	Active	
EX 2183	Xi Alpha Xi		Las Cruces, New Mexico	NM	Active	
EX 2198	Xi Alpha Beta		Smith, Nevada	NV	Active	
EX 2202	Xi Delta Psi		Kankakee, Illinois	IL	Active	
EX 2204	Xi Chi		Scottsdale, Arizona	AZ	Active	
EX 2213	Xi Beta Upsilon		Sedalia, Missouri	MO	Active	
EX 2214	Xi Tau		Tuscaloosa, Alabama	AL	Active	
EX 2237	Xi Eta Nu		Bryan, Texas	TX	Active	
EX 2251	Xi Alpha Rho		Oak Hill, West Virginia	WV	Active	
EX 2258	Xi Eta Pi		Fort Worth, Texas	TX	Active	
EX 2261	Xi Theta		Dover, Delaware	DE	Active	
EX 2270	Xi Beta Zeta		Spokane, Washington	WA	Active	
EX 2275	Xi Epsilon Pi		Dayton, Ohio	OH	Active	
EX 2278	Xi Nu		Cody, Wyoming	WY	Active	
EX 2289	Xi Beta Eta		Glen Head, New York	NY	Active	
EX 2295	Xi Alpha Beta		Woodstown, New Jersey	NJ	Active	
EX 2315	Xi Theta Psi		Anaheim, California	CA	Active	
EX 2327	Xi Alpha Delta		Salisbury, North Carolina	NC	Active	
EX 2337	Xi Gamma Gamma		Richmond, Indiana	IN	Active	
EX 2344	Xi Iota Zeta		San Jose, California	CA	Active	
EX 2346	Xi Beta Gamma		Woodstock, Ontario, Canada	ON	Active	
EX 2367	Xi Beta Delta		Chatham, Ontario, Canada	ON	Active	
EX 2370	Xi Iota Mu		Crescent City, California	CA	Active	
EX 2382	Xi Tau		Lafayette, Louisiana	LA	Active	
EX 2387	Xi Theta Delta		Sherman, Texas	TX	Active	
EX 2389	Xi Alpha Zeta		Wilson, North Carolina	NC	Active	
EX 2404	Xi Beta Zeta		Belleville, Ontario, Canada	ON	Active	
EX 2410	Xi Alpha Phi		Yorktown, Virginia	VA	Active	
EX 2419	Xi Alpha Zeta		Shelbyville, Tennessee	TN	Active	
EX 2455	Xi Psi		Douglas, Arizona	AZ	Active	
EX 2456	Xi Sigma		Helena, Montana	MT	Active	
EX 2458	Xi Omega		Yuma, Arizona	AZ	Active	
EX 2502	Xi Theta Pi		Levelland, Texas	TX	Active	
EX 2504	Xi Alpha Epsilon		Elmer, New Jersey	NJ	Active	
EX 2510	Xi Delta		St. John's, Newfoundland and Labrador, Canada	NL	Active	
EX 2513	Xi Gamma Mu		Indianapolis, Indiana	IN	Active	
EX 2516	Xi Psi		North Vancouver, British Columbia, Canada	BC	Active	
EX 2534	Xi Upsilon		La Crosse, Wisconsin	WI	Active	
EX 2540	Xi Delta Delta		Tampa, Florida	FL	Active	
EX 2553	Xi Gamma Xi		Logansport, Indiana	IN	Active	
EX 2565	Xi Gamma Zeta		Stanberry, Missouri	MO	Active	
EX 2574	Xi Pi		Riverton, Wyoming	WY	Active	
EX 2575	Xi Xi		Tioga, North Dakota	ND	Active	
EX 2578	Xi Sigma		Andover, Massachusetts	MA	Active	
EX 2581	Xi Beta Mu		Buffalo, New York	NY	Active	
EX 2589	Xi Beta Nu		Joseph, Oregon	OR	Active	
EX 2594	Xi Beta Upsilon		Belmond, Iowa	IA	Active	
EX 2602	Xi Beta Mu		Trenton, Ontario, Canada	ON	Active	
EX 2603	Xi Alpha Chi		Alamogordo, New Mexico	NM	Active	
EX 2607	Xi Alpha Psi		Mullens, West Virginia	WV	Active	
EX 2610	Xi Beta Xi		Waldport, Oregon	OR	Active	
EX 2615	Xi Gamma Sigma		Sayre, Pennsylvania	PA	Active	
EX 2621	Xi Beta Xi		Othello, Washington	WA	Active	
EX 2627	Xi Beta Phi		Atlantic, Iowa	IA	Active	
EX 2628	Xi Gamma Zeta		Higginsville, Missouri	MO	Active	
EX 2632	Xi Alpha Chi		Frederick, Oklahoma	OK	Active	
EX 2649	Xi Alpha Omega		Alexandria, Virginia	VA	Active	
EX 2657	Xi Kappa Pi		Vacaville, California	CA	Active	
EX 2661	Xi Iota Alpha		Lubbock, Texas	TX	Active	
EX 2662	Xi Beta Sigma		Redmond, Oregon	OR	Active	
EX 2671	Xi Zeta Alpha		Berea, Ohio	OH	Active	
EX 2681	Xi Epsilon Tau		Savanna, Illinois	IL	Active	
EX 2689	Xi Delta Mu		Titusville, Florida	FL	Active	
EX 2695	Xi Zeta Gamma		Findlay, Ohio	OH	Active	
EX 2704	Xi Iota Delta		Denver City, Texas	TX	Active	
EX 2713	Xi Beta Omega		Denison, Iowa	IA	Active	
EX 2727	Xi Gamma Epsilon		Herington, Kansas	KS	Active	
EX 2764	Xi Lambda Kappa		South Lake Tahoe, California	CA	Active	
EX 2775	Xi Gamma Theta		Augusta, Kansas	KS	Active	
EX 2800	Xi Beta Beta		Oklahoma City, Oklahoma	OK	Active	
EX 2801	Xi Delta Rho		Miami, Florida	FL	Active	
EX 2809	Xi Lambda Pi		Turlock, California	CA	Active	
EX 2810	Xi Gamma Alpha		Dubuque, Iowa	IA	Active	
EX 2829	Xi Gamma Gamma		Kalamazoo, Michigan	MI	Active	
EX 2850	Xi Beta Epsilon		Vinita, Oklahoma	OK	Active	
EX 2862	Xi Gamma Rho		Paris, Missouri	MO	Active	
EX 2877	Xi Iota Pi		Amarillo, Texas	TX	Active	
EX 2889	Xi Alpha Epsilon		Comox, British Columbia, Canada	BC	Active	
EX 2903	Xi Alpha Zeta		Orofino, Idaho	ID	Active	
EX 2911	Xi Gamma Alpha		Sunnyside, Washington	WA	Active	
EX 2926	Xi Alpha Tau		Marietta, Georgia	GA	Active	
EX 2931	Xi Gamma Chi		Kansas City, Missouri	MO	Active	
EX 2934	Xi Beta Iota		Elk City, Oklahoma	OK	Active	
EX 2942	Xi Lambda		Columbus, Mississippi	MS	Active	
EX 2978	Xi Beta Tau		London, Ontario, Canada	ON	Active	
EX 2985	Xi Alpha Mu		Fayetteville, North Carolina	NC	Active	
EX 2987	Xi Gamma Omega		Anderson, Indiana	IN	Active	
EX 2988	Xi Zeta Nu		Edwardsville, Illinois	IL	Active	
EX 2993	Xi Gamma Theta		Lansing, Michigan	MI	Active	
EX 3013	Xi Mu Chi		Corning, California	CA	Active	
EX 3033	Xi Phi		Bowie, Maryland	MD	Active	
EX 3040	Xi Mu		Holly Springs, Mississippi	MS	Active	
EX 3041	Xi Delta Delta		Montoursville, Pennsylvania	PA	Active	
EX 3044	Xi Nu Gamma		Hemet, California	CA	Active	
EX 3068	Xi Nu Zeta		Newhall, California	CA	Active	
EX 3075	Xi Alpha Theta		Baton Rouge, Louisiana	LA	Active	
EX 3088	Xi Alpha Xi		Lenoir, North Carolina	NC	Active	
EX 3102	Xi Tau		Havre, Montana	MT	Active	
EX 3107	Xi Zeta Sigma		Herrin, Illinois	IL	Active	
EX 3108	Xi Zeta Omicron		Crooksville, Ohio	OH	Active	
EX 3109	Xi Epsilon Xi		Daytona Beach, Florida	FL	Active	
EX 3135	Xi Epsilon Rho		Fort Pierce, Florida	FL	Active	
EX 3136	Xi Beta Epsilon		Pineville, West Virginia	WV	Active	
EX 3139	Xi Kappa Xi		El Paso, Texas	TX	Active	
EX 3151	Xi Beta Omega		Amherstburg, Ontario, Canada	ON	Active	
EX 3169	Xi Nu Psi		San Diego, California	CA	Active	
EX 3170	Xi Eta Alpha		Litchfield, Illinois	IL	Active	
EX 3187	Xi Beta Tau		Salamanca, New York	NY	Active	
EX 3196	Xi Alpha Pi		Mount Airy, North Carolina	NC	Active	
EX 3198	Xi Kappa Chi		Refugio, Texas	TX	Active	
EX 3214	Xi Alpha Rho		Greensboro, North Carolina	NC	Active	
EX 3244	Xi Epsilon Chi		Inverness, Florida	FL	Active	
EX 3245	Xi Gamma Phi		Grand Rapids, Michigan	MI	Active	
EX 3248	Xi Eta Gamma		Du Quoin, Illinois	IL	Active	
EX 3277	Xi Zeta Alpha		St. Augustine, Florida	FL	Active	
EX 3294	Xi Lambda Lambda		Winnie, Texas	TX	Active	
EX 3304	Xi Alpha Sigma		Franklin, Tennessee	TN	Active	
EX 3310	Xi Beta Rho		Norman, Oklahoma	OK	Active	
EX 3317	Xi Alpha Xi		Scottsbluff, Nebraska	NE	Active	
EX 3342	Xi Delta Omicron		Park Hills, Missouri	MO	Active	
EX 3353	Xi Lambda Rho		Friendswood, Texas	TX	Active	
EX 3359	Xi Phi		Hot Springs, South Dakota	SD	Active	
EX 3367	Xi Chi		Louisville, Kentucky	KY	Active	
EX 3381	Xi Psi		Sioux Falls, South Dakota	SD	Active	
EX 3382	Xi Xi Psi		Pleasanton, California	CA	Active	
EX 3384	Xi Alpha Sigma		North Platte, Nebraska	NE	Active	
EX 3409	Xi Beta Upsilon		Edmond, Oklahoma	OK	Active	
EX 3410	Xi Gamma Lambda		Broomfield, Colorado	CO	Active	
EX 3427	Xi Eta Omicron		Rantoul, Illinois	IL	Active	
EX 3434	Xi Gamma Lambda		Port Orchard, Washington	WA	Active	
EX 3450	Xi Alpha Epsilon		White Bear Lake, Minnesota	MN	Active	
EX 3452	Xi Delta Epsilon		Kendallville, Indiana	IN	Active	
EX 3478	Xi Gamma Epsilon		Corvallis, Oregon	OR	Active	
EX 3479	Xi Alpha Tau		Lodgepole, Nebraska	NE	Active	
EX 3487	Xi Eta Epsilon		Circleville, Ohio	OH	Active	
EX 3502	Xi Alpha Omega		Jacksonville, North Carolina	NC	Active	
EX 3505	Xi Omicron Mu		China Lake, California	CA	Active	
EX 3512	Xi Eta Iota		Harrison, Ohio	OH	Active	
EX 3541	Xi Gamma Omega		Lawrence, Kansas	KS	Active	
EX 3545	Xi Alpha Omega		Murfreesboro, Tennessee	TN	Active	
EX 3549	Xi Omicron		Greenville, Mississippi	MS	Active	
EX 3558	Xi Delta Beta		Wichita, Kansas	KS	Active	
EX 3566	Xi Beta Rho		Manassas, Virginia	VA	Active	
EX 3568	Xi Gamma Psi		Ankeny, Iowa	IA	Active	
EX 3599	Xi Omicron Chi		Pleasant Hill, California	CA	Active	
EX 3601	Xi Alpha Sigma		Ajo, Arizona	AZ	Active	
EX 3620	Xi Beta Gamma		Knoxville, Tennessee	TN	Active	
EX 3641	Xi Delta Gamma		Dubuque, Iowa	IA	Active	
EX 3644	Xi Alpha Theta		Salt Lake City, Utah	UT	Active	
EX 3646	Xi Delta Omega		Tamaqua, Pennsylvania	PA	Active	
EX 3663	Xi Delta Delta		Indianola, Iowa	IA	Active	
EX 3666	Xi Mu Pi		San Angelo, Texas	TX	Active	
EX 3668	Xi Epsilon Gamma		Cameron, Missouri	MO	Active	
EX 3686	Xi Alpha Kappa		Lewiston, Idaho	ID	Active	
EX 3693	Xi Delta Epsilon		Fort Dodge, Iowa	IA	Active	
EX 3696	Xi Epsilon Epsilon		Clinton, Missouri	MO	Active	
EX 3704	Xi Alpha Mu		Bonners Ferry, Idaho	ID	Active	
EX 3705	Xi Beta Iota		Atlanta, Georgia	GA	Active	
EX 3713	Xi Pi Delta		Burlingame, California	CA	Active	
EX 3724	Xi Alpha Nu		Merrill, Wisconsin	WI	Active	
EX 3725	Xi Gamma Xi		Colorado Springs, Colorado	CO	Active	
EX 3732	Xi Alpha Sigma		Kelowna, British Columbia, Canada	BC	Active	
EX 3793	Xi Beta Lambda		Albany, Georgia	GA	Active	
EX 3803	Xi Pi Nu		Chico, California	CA	Active	
EX 3804	Xi Epsilon Lambda		Caruthersville, Missouri	MO	Active	
EX 3805	Xi Gamma Pi		Newmarket, Ontario, Canada	ON	Active	
EX 3808	Xi Gamma Rho		London, Ontario, Canada	ON	Active	
EX 3814	Xi Alpha Phi		Campbell River, British Columbia, Canada	BC	Active	
EX 3815	Xi Theta Epsilon		Dayton, Ohio	OH	Active	
EX 3821	Xi Gamma Mu		Ontario, Oregon	OR	Active	
EX 3828	Xi Epsilon Nu		Cape Girardeau, Missouri	MO	Active	
EX 3829	Xi Alpha Nu		Pierce, Idaho	ID	Active	
EX 3833	Xi Nu Beta		Palestine, Texas	TX	Active	
EX 3844	Xi Alpha Psi		Delta, British Columbia, Canada	BC	Active	
EX 3855	Xi Alpha Nu		St. Cloud, Minnesota	MN	Active	
EX 3859	Xi Alpha Xi		Boise, Idaho	ID	Active	
EX 3860	Xi Pi Rho		Napa, California	CA	Active	
EX 3867	Xi Alpha Zeta		Laurel, Maryland	MD	Active	
EX 3870	Xi Epsilon Zeta		Williamsport, Pennsylvania	PA	Active	
EX 3875	Xi Alpha Pi		Ozark, Arkansas	AR	Active	
EX 3885	Xi Gamma Sigma		Rocky Ford, Colorado	CO	Active	
EX 3886	Xi Alpha Beta		Woodland, Maine	ME	Active	
EX 3888	Xi Alpha Omega		Surrey, British Columbia, Canada	BC	Active	
EX 3889	Xi Beta Alpha		Coquitlam, British Columbia, Canada	BC	Active	
EX 3891	Xi Nu Theta		League City, Texas	TX	Active	
EX 3898	Xi Delta Theta		Battle Creek, Michigan	MI	Active	
EX 3904	Xi Gamma Iota		Old Forge, New York	NY	Active	
EX 3907	Xi Nu Nu		Littlefield, Texas	TX	Active	
EX 3912	Xi Psi		Rutland, Massachusetts	MA	Active	
EX 3933	Xi Nu Pi		Tyler, Texas	TX	Active	
EX 3947	Xi Nu Sigma		Vernon, Texas	TX	Active	
EX 3954	Xi Delta Gamma		Elgin, Illinois	IL	Active	
EX 3961	Xi Delta Iota		Hays, Kansas	KS	Active	
EX 3973	Xi Beta Epsilon		Charlotte, North Carolina	NC	Active	
EX 3978	Xi Nu Phi		Cuero, Texas	TX	Active	
EX 3979	Xi Eta Xi		Cocoa, Florida	FL	Active	
EX 3984	Xi Zeta		Grand Falls, Newfoundland and Labrador, Canada	NL	Active	
EX 3989	Xi Gamma Chi		Windsor, Ontario, Canada	ON	Active	
EX 3992	Xi Epsilon Upsilon		Odessa, Missouri	MO	Active	
EX 3996	Xi Rho Iota		Redding, California	CA	Active	
EX 3997	Xi Gamma Xi		Corvallis, Oregon	OR	Active	
EX 3998	Xi Alpha Chi		Phoenix, Arizona	AZ	Active	
EX 4009	Xi Alpha Iota		Birmingham, Alabama	AL	Active	
EX 4011	Xi Beta Delta		Lake Charles, Louisiana	LA	Active	
EX 4012	Xi Nu Omega		Azle, Texas	TX	Active	
EX 4029	Xi Epsilon Chi		Fulton, Missouri	MO	Active	
EX 4037	Xi Alpha Delta		Gaffney, South Carolina	SC	Active	
EX 4052	Xi Delta Omicron		Muscatine, Iowa	IA	Active	
EX 4060	Xi Xi Kappa		Plano, Texas	TX	Active	
EX 4062	Xi Gamma Omega		Guelph, Ontario, Canada	ON	Active	
EX 4070	Xi Gamma Pi		Albany, Oregon	OR	Active	
EX 4071	Xi Alpha Xi		Appleton, Wisconsin	WI	Active	
EX 4081	Xi Delta Mu		Dowagiac, Michigan	MI	Active	
EX 4082	Xi Beta Xi		Carthage, Tennessee	TN	Active	
EX 4117	Xi Xi Sigma		Copperas Cove, Texas	TX	Active	
EX 4123	Xi Xi Tau		Lubbock, Texas	TX	Active	
EX 4127	Xi Beta Zeta		Succasunna, New Jersey	NJ	Active	
EX 4130	Xi Xi Upsilon		Dumas, Texas	TX	Active	
EX 4134	Xi Beta Eta		Toms River, New Jersey	NJ	Active	
EX 4141	Xi Alpha Sigma		Arkadelphia, Arkansas	AR	Active	
EX 4147	Xi Lambda		Honolulu, Hawaii	HI	Active	
EX 4154	Xi Rho Chi		West Sacramento, California	CA	Active	
EX 4166	Xi Xi Psi		Fort Worth, Texas	TX	Active	
EX 4168	Xi Delta Omicron		South Haven, Michigan	MI	Active	
EX 4170	Xi Beta Delta		Kamloops, British Columbia, Canada	BC	Active	
EX 4173	Xi Delta Nu		Shawnee, Kansas	KS	Active	
EX 4192	Xi Rho Omega		Pleasanton, California	CA	Active	
EX 4193	Xi Alpha Omicron		Necedah, Wisconsin	WI	Active	
EX 4223	Xi Beta Theta		Surrey, British Columbia, Canada	BC	Active	
EX 4225	Xi Delta Zeta		Mississauga, Ontario, Canada	ON	Active	
EX 4236	Xi Zeta Beta		Kansas City, Missouri	MO	Active	
EX 4246	Xi Omicron Lambda		Del Rio, Texas	TX	Active	
EX 4251	Xi Delta Theta		Burlington, Ontario, Canada	ON	Active	
EX 4262	Xi Theta Zeta		Panama City, Florida	FL	Active	
EX 4265	Xi Omicron Xi		Muleshoe, Texas	TX	Active	
EX 4269	Xi Gamma Nu		Alva, Oklahoma	OK	Active	
EX 4273	Xi Epsilon Tau		South Williamsport, Pennsylvania	PA	Active	
EX 4280	Xi Zeta Delta		Bethany, Missouri	MO	Active	
EX 4292	Xi Alpha Rho		Saint Paul, Minnesota	MN	Active	
EX 4295	Xi Theta Tau		Harrisburg, Illinois	IL	Active	
EX 4299	Xi Delta Sigma		Atchison, Kansas	KS	Active	
EX 4306	Xi Theta Chi		Parma, Ohio	OH	Active	
EX 4323	Xi Zeta Epsilon		Savannah, Missouri	MO	Active	
EX 4324	Xi Beta Phi		Huntington, West Virginia	WV	Active	
EX 4326	Xi Omicron Phi		Harlingen, Texas	TX	Active	
EX 4335	Xi Delta Lambda		LaSalle, Ontario, Canada	ON	Active	
EX 4339	Xi Rho Psi		Lucerne, California	CA	Active	
EX 4345	Xi Theta Phi		Geneseo, Illinois	IL	Active	
EX 4346	Xi Alpha Chi		Boise, Idaho	ID	Active	
EX 4352	Xi Tau		Fort Saskatchewan, Alberta, Canada	AB	Active	
EX 4361	Xi Theta Chi		Robinson, Illinois	IL	Active	
EX 4374	Xi Beta Phi		Decatur, Georgia	GA	Active	
EX 4396	Xi Beta Lambda		Kelowna, British Columbia, Canada	BC	Active	
EX 4405	Xi Delta Upsilon		Great Bend, Kansas	KS	Active	
EX 4407	Xi Pi Iota		Trophy Club, Texas	TX	Active	
EX 4414	Xi Gamma Sigma		Ponca City, Oklahoma	OK	Active	
EX 4419	Xi Zeta Iota		Richmond, Missouri	MO	Active	
EX 4421	Xi Pi Mu		Kilgore, Texas	TX	Active	
EX 4424	Xi Alpha Theta		Frankfort, Kentucky	KY	Active	
EX 4430	Xi Beta Theta		Concord, North Carolina	NC	Active	
EX 4445	Xi Alpha Nu		Battle Mountain, Nevada	NV	Active	
EX 4451	Xi Delta Rho		St. Catharines, Ontario, Canada	ON	Active	
EX 4453	Xi Beta Mu		Terrace, British Columbia, Canada	BC	Active	
EX 4454	Xi Iota Zeta		Springfield, Ohio	OH	Active	
EX 4461	Xi Gamma Psi		Shelton, Washington	WA	Active	
EX 4465	Xi Beta Theta		Eunice, Louisiana	LA	Active	
EX 4466	Xi Iota Eta		Castalia, Ohio	OH	Active	
EX 4469	Xi Iota Delta		Steeleville, Illinois	IL	Active	
EX 4473	Xi Theta Upsilon		Temple Terrace, Florida	FL	Active	
EX 4492	Xi Beta Kappa		Greensboro, North Carolina	NC	Active	
EX 4493	Xi Alpha Delta		Danbury, Connecticut	CT	Active	
EX 4498	Xi Iota Epsilon		Du Quoin, Illinois	IL	Active	
EX 4506	Xi Sigma Omicron		Yuba City, California	CA	Active	
EX 4527	Xi Alpha Xi		Sykesville, Maryland	MD	Active	
EX 4541	Xi Iota Alpha		Belle Glade, Florida	FL	Active	
EX 4545	Xi Beta Mu		DeRidder, Louisiana	LA	Active	
EX 4556	Xi Beta Lambda		Apache Junction, Arizona	AZ	Active	
EX 4566	Xi Epsilon Beta		Novi, Michigan	MI	Active	
EX 4567	Xi Delta Upsilon		Simcoe, Ontario, Canada	ON	Active	
EX 4569	Xi Gamma Pi		Winchester, Virginia	VA	Active	
EX 4570	Xi Gamma Rho		Colonial Heights, Virginia	VA	Active	
EX 4579	Xi Sigma Rho		Crescent City, California	CA	Active	
EX 4586	Xi Alpha Nu		Ozark, Alabama	AL	Active	
EX 4587	Xi Mu		Honolulu, Hawaii	HI	Active	
EX 4591	Xi Delta Psi		Erie, Kansas	KS	Active	
EX 4604	Xi Delta Chi		Thornhill, Ontario, Canada	ON	Active	
EX 4608	Xi Alpha Theta		Watertown, South Dakota	SD	Active	
EX 4609	Xi Tau		Devils Lake, North Dakota	ND	Active	
EX 4612	Xi Pi Psi		Eagle Lake, Texas	TX	Active	
EX 4616	Xi Alpha Xi		Bessemer, Alabama	AL	Active	
EX 4630	Xi Iota Omicron		Fairborn, Ohio	OH	Active	
EX 4635	Xi Rho Gamma		Vernon, Texas	TX	Active	
EX 4647	Xi Delta Beta		Lawton, Oklahoma	OK	Active	
EX 4651	Xi Delta Gamma		Ada, Oklahoma	OK	Active	
EX 4654	Xi Iota Lambda		Olney, Illinois	IL	Active	
EX 4674	Xi Epsilon Gamma		Charlevoix, Michigan	MI	Active	
EX 4699	Xi Eta		Fredericton, New Brunswick, Canada	NB	Active	
EX 4700	Xi Alpha Alpha		Amory, Mississippi	MS	Active	
EX 4701	Xi Zeta Upsilon		Platte City, Missouri	MO	Active	
EX 4705	Xi Beta Delta		Monticello, Arkansas	AR	Active	
EX 4713	Xi Delta Theta		Altus, Oklahoma	OK	Active	
EX 4714	Xi Beta Sigma		Natchitoches, Louisiana	LA	Active	
EX 4715	Xi Rho Theta		Ennis, Texas	TX	Active	
EX 4720	Xi Rho Lambda		Amarillo, Texas	TX	Active	
EX 4728	Xi Zeta Chi		Carthage, Missouri	MO	Active	
EX 4729	Xi Beta Xi		York, Nebraska	NE	Active	
EX 4734	Xi Epsilon Xi		New Hampton, Iowa	IA	Active	
EX 4735	Xi Rho Xi		Huntsville, Texas	TX	Active	
EX 4741	Xi Alpha Omicron		Huntsville, Alabama	AL	Active	
EX 4742	Xi Tau Delta		Vacaville, California	CA	Active	
EX 4757	Xi Mu		Sackville, Nova Scotia, Canada	NS	Active	
EX 4761	Xi Beta Upsilon		Kinston, North Carolina	NC	Active	
EX 4782	Xi Rho Psi		Port Arthur, Texas	TX	Active	
EX 4786	Xi Sigma Alpha		El Paso, Texas	TX	Active	
EX 4793	Xi Alpha Pi		Gadsden, Alabama	AL	Active	
EX 4805	Xi Gamma Phi		Woodbridge, Virginia	VA	Active	
EX 4819	Xi Sigma Delta		Houston, Texas	TX	Active	
EX 4827	Xi Tau Theta		Oakdale, California	CA	Active	
EX 4832	Xi Eta Epsilon		Sweet Springs, Missouri	MO	Active	
EX 4853	Xi Beta Phi		Kelowna, British Columbia, Canada	BC	Active	
EX 4856	Xi Alpha Xi		Henderson, Nevada	NV	Active	
EX 4860	Xi Zeta Omicron		Huntingdon, Pennsylvania	PA	Active	
EX 4866	Xi Epsilon Eta		Independence, Kansas	KS	Active	
EX 4881	Xi Epsilon Lambda		Coffeyville, Kansas	KS	Active	
EX 4884	Xi Zeta Pi		Lock Haven, Pennsylvania	PA	Active	
EX 4889	Xi Epsilon Mu		Junction City, Kansas	KS	Active	
EX 4897	Xi Kappa Gamma		Dayton, Ohio	OH	Active	
EX 4904	Xi Alpha Gamma		Hattiesburg, Mississippi	MS	Active	
EX 4912	Xi Beta Omega		New Iberia, Louisiana	LA	Active	
EX 4924	Xi Alpha Eta		Torrington, Wyoming	WY	Active	
EX 4925	Xi Alpha Lambda		Sioux Falls, South Dakota	SD	Active	
EX 4940	Xi Gamma Alpha		Greensboro, North Carolina	NC	Active	
EX 4954	Xi Zeta Rho		Hughesville, Pennsylvania	PA	Active	
EX 4976	Xi Beta Sigma		Lake Havasu City, Arizona	AZ	Active	
EX 4982	Xi Tau Alpha		Electra, Texas	TX	Active	
EX 4994	Xi Iota Phi		West Frankfort, Illinois	IL	Active	
EX 5006	Xi Delta Gamma		Manassas, Virginia	VA	Active	
EX 5009	Xi Alpha Gamma		Polson, Montana	MT	Active	
EX 5023	Xi Gamma Zeta		Vernon, British Columbia, Canada	BC	Active	
EX 5040	Xi Delta Delta		Suffolk, Virginia	VA	Active	
EX 5046	Xi Epsilon Chi		Carroll, Iowa	IA	Active	
EX 5048	Xi Zeta Tau		Bethel Park, Pennsylvania	PA	Active	
EX 5056	Xi Gamma Eta		Fernie, British Columbia, Canada	BC	Active	
EX 5060	Xi Alpha Sigma		Gulf Shores, Alabama	AL	Active	
EX 5061	Xi Tau Iota		Katy, Texas	TX	Active	
EX 5065	Xi Tau Tau		Santa Clarita, California	CA	Active	
EX 5071	Xi Tau Mu		Henderson, Texas	TX	Active	
EX 5078	Xi Delta Pi		Yale, Oklahoma	OK	Active	
EX 5082	Xi Gamma Omicron		Augusta, Georgia	GA	Active	
EX 5083	Xi Gamma Zeta		Brevard, North Carolina	NC	Active	
EX 5089	Xi Delta Eta		Delta, Colorado	CO	Active	
EX 5092	Xi Tau Omicron		Galveston, Texas	TX	Active	
EX 5111	Xi Tau Sigma		Farmers Branch, Texas	TX	Active	
EX 5113	Xi Tau Tau		Brazoria, Texas	TX	Active	
EX 5132	Xi Gamma Theta		Merritt, British Columbia, Canada	BC	Active	
EX 5133	Xi Gamma Iota		Qualicum Beach, British Columbia, Canada	BC	Active	
EX 5136	Xi Kappa Kappa		Homestead, Florida	FL	Active	
EX 5138	Xi Epsilon Zeta		Timmins, Ontario, Canada	ON	Active	
EX 5151	Xi Chi		Wichita, Kansas	KS	Active	
EX 5152	Xi Beta Sigma		Clovis, New Mexico	NM	Active	
EX 5155	Xi Gamma Kappa		Lake Cowichan, British Columbia, Canada	BC	Active	
EX 5160	Xi Kappa Gamma		Galva, Illinois	IL	Active	
EX 5163	Xi Gamma Omega		Gretna, Louisiana	LA	Active	
EX 5170	Xi Epsilon Eta		Oakville, Ontario, Canada	ON	Active	
EX 5182	Xi Delta Iota		Springfield, Colorado	CO	Active	
EX 5189	Xi Gamma Lambda		Chilliwack, British Columbia, Canada	BC	Active	
EX 5190	Xi Theta Beta		Oak Grove, Missouri	MO	Active	
EX 5202	Xi Upsilon		Minot, North Dakota	ND	Active	
EX 5211	Xi Gamma Kappa		Belton, Missouri	MO	Active	
EX 5236	Xi Alpha Eta		Cleveland, Mississippi	MS	Active	
EX 5239	Xi Upsilon Kappa		San Marcos, Texas	TX	Active	
EX 5243	Xi Gamma Nu		Grand Forks, British Columbia, Canada	BC	Active	
EX 5254	Xi Kappa Lambda		Mount Vernon, Ohio	OH	Active	
EX 5259	Xi Zeta Epsilon		Dallas Center, Iowa	IA	Active	
EX 5262	Xi Delta Upsilon		Dumas, Texas	TX	Active	
EX 5287	Xi Alpha Tau		Ellicott City, Maryland	MD	Active	
EX 5290	Xi Gamma Delta		White Sulphur Springs, West Virginia	WV	Active	
EX 5291	Xi Delta Kappa		Hampton, Virginia	VA	Active	
EX 5292	Xi Delta Kappa		Littleton, Colorado	CO	Active	
EX 5293	Xi Zeta Eta		St. John, Kansas	KS	Active	
EX 5295	Xi Delta Lambda		Gig Harbor, Washington	WA	Active	
EX 5301	Xi Delta Beta		Astoria, Oregon	OR	Active	
EX 5313	Xi Zeta Zeta		Colby, Kansas	KS	Active	
EX 5315	Xi Eta Beta		Meadville, Pennsylvania	PA	Active	
EX 5325	Xi Upsilon Psi		Yoakum, Texas	TX	Active	
EX 5331	Xi Zeta Iota		Nevada, Iowa	IA	Active	
EX 5332	Xi Delta Gamma		Burns, Oregon	OR	Active	
EX 5336	Xi Zeta Kappa		Rock Rapids, Iowa	IA	Active	
EX 5340	Xi Alpha Pi		Rapid City, South Dakota	SD	Active	
EX 5350	Xi Beta Iota		Potlatch, Idaho	ID	Active	
EX 5359	Xi Epsilon Mu		Harrow, Ontario, Canada	ON	Active	
EX 5366	Xi Zeta Lambda		Osceola, Iowa	IA	Active	
EX 5369	Xi Beta Pi		Cape May, New Jersey	NJ	Active	
EX 5371	Xi Gamma Tau		Kingston, Tennessee	TN	Active	
EX 5376	Xi Gamma Pi		Delta, British Columbia, Canada	BC	Active	
EX 5378	Xi Alpha Omicron		Layton, Utah	UT	Active	
EX 5379	Xi Kappa Rho		Miami, Florida	FL	Active	
EX 5380	Xi Kappa Sigma		Spring Hill, Florida	FL	Active	
EX 5383	Xi Theta Mu		Versailles, Missouri	MO	Active	
EX 5400	Xi Beta Psi		Bellevue, Nebraska	NE	Active	
EX 5411	Xi Delta Omicron		Sunnyside, Washington	WA	Active	
EX 5413	Xi Theta Pi		Hillsboro, Missouri	MO	Active	
EX 5415	Xi Gamma Iota		Baton Rouge, Louisiana	LA	Active	
EX 5417	Xi Beta Omega		Valentine, Nebraska	NE	Active	
EX 5426	Xi Epsilon Pi		Richmond, Ontario, Canada	ON	Active	
EX 5436	Xi Beta Rho		Sparta, New Jersey	NJ	Active	
EX 5437	Xi Theta Tau		Memphis, Missouri	MO	Active	
EX 5442	Xi Lambda		Quispamsis, New Brunswick, Canada	NB	Active	
EX 5443	Xi Theta Upsilon		Laredo, Missouri	MO	Active	
EX 5455	Xi Kappa Omicron		Crooksville, Ohio	OH	Active	
EX 5474	Xi Kappa Nu		Carterville, Illinois	IL	Active	
EX 5480	Xi Beta Delta		Fort Atkinson, Wisconsin	WI	Active	
EX 5486	Xi Epsilon Upsilon		Uxbridge, Ontario, Canada	ON	Active	
EX 5491	Xi Epsilon Phi		Oakville, Ontario, Canada	ON	Active	
EX 5492	Xi Lambda Delta		New Port Richey, Florida	FL	Active	
EX 5495	Xi Eta Theta		Jersey Shore, Pennsylvania	PA	Active	
EX 5501	Xi Gamma Alpha		Norfolk, Nebraska	NE	Active	
EX 5509	Xi Zeta Omicron		Osborne, Kansas	KS	Active	
EX 5519	Xi Kappa Rho		McLeansboro, Illinois	IL	Active	
EX 5527	Xi Beta Phi		Silver City, New Mexico	NM	Active	
EX 5537	Xi Delta Rho		Fowler, Colorado	CO	Active	
EX 5545	Xi Phi Sigma		Texarkana, Texas	TX	Active	
EX 5552	Xi Delta Epsilon		Beaverton, Oregon	OR	Active	
EX 5555	Xi Gamma Lambda		Slidell, Louisiana	LA	Active	
EX 5561	Xi Alpha Phi		Bowie, Maryland	MD	Active	
EX 5562	Xi Zeta Sigma		Ackley, Iowa	IA	Active	
EX 5565	Xi Kappa Sigma		Youngstown, Ohio	OH	Active	
EX 5573	Xi Gamma Chi		Penticton, British Columbia, Canada	BC	Active	
EX 5585	Xi Beta Lambda		Soda Springs, Idaho	ID	Active	
EX 5597	Xi Beta Beta		Birmingham, Alabama	AL	Active	
EX 5602	Xi Alpha Upsilon		Columbia, South Carolina	SC	Active	
EX 5610	Xi Gamma Epsilon		Bullhead City, Arizona	AZ	Active	
EX 5617	Xi Alpha Theta		Moss Point, Mississippi	MS	Active	
EX 5620	Xi Iota Gamma		Pleasant Hill, Missouri	MO	Active	
EX 5627	Xi Zeta Gamma		Kincardine, Ontario, Canada	ON	Active	
EX 5643	Xi Epsilon Iota		Bristow, Oklahoma	OK	Active	
EX 5658	Xi Chi Theta		Yoakum, Texas	TX	Active	
EX 5660	Xi Gamma Epsilon		La Vista, Nebraska	NE	Active	
EX 5662	Xi Gamma Zeta		Martinsburg, West Virginia	WV	Active	
EX 5676	Xi Gamma Zeta		Tucson, Arizona	AZ	Active	
EX 5735	Xi Chi Pi		Albany, Texas	TX	Active	
EX 5752	Xi Beta Alpha		Waldorf, Maryland	MD	Active	
EX 5758	Xi Gamma Eta		Kingman, Arizona	AZ	Active	
EX 5776	Xi Xi		Sussex, New Brunswick, Canada	NB	Active	
EX 5788	Xi Delta Psi		Smithfield, Virginia	VA	Active	
EX 5795	Xi Eta Kappa		Danville, Pennsylvania	PA	Active	
EX 5798	Xi Psi Alpha		Childress, Texas	TX	Active	
EX 5818	Xi Iota Lambda		Shelbina, Missouri	MO	Active	
EX 5820	Xi Alpha Chi		Surfside Beach, South Carolina	SC	Active	
EX 5824	Xi Delta Iota		Oneonta, New York	NY	Active	
EX 5827	Xi Alpha Omicron		Wright, Wyoming	WY	Active	
EX 5835	Xi Upsilon Chi		Weed, California	CA	Active	
EX 5837	Xi Beta Kappa		Sun Prairie, Wisconsin	WI	Active	
EX 5863	Xi Delta Theta		Reidsville, Georgia	GA	Active	
EX 5864	Xi Eta Epsilon		Neodesha, Kansas	KS	Active	
EX 5875	Xi Psi Xi		Friendswood, Texas	TX	Active	
EX 5878	Xi Epsilon Beta		Woodstock, Virginia	VA	Active	
EX 5884	Xi Gamma Lambda		Ogallala, Nebraska	NE	Active	
EX 5887	Xi Beta Upsilon		Princeton, New Jersey	NJ	Active	
EX 5888	Xi Gamma Mu		Aurora, Nebraska	NE	Active	
EX 5889	Xi Lambda		Conception Bay South, Newfoundland and Labrador, Canada	NL	Active	
EX 5892	Xi Epsilon Rho		Perry, Oklahoma	OK	Active	
EX 5904	Xi Psi Tau		Victoria, Texas	TX	Active	
EX 5906	Xi Eta Theta		Wamego, Kansas	KS	Active	
EX 5911	Xi Delta Beta		Erath, Louisiana	LA	Active	
EX 5913	Xi Delta Iota		Cranbrook, British Columbia, Canada	BC	Active	
EX 5929	Xi Psi Chi		Gilmer, Texas	TX	Active	
EX 5934	Xi Lambda Upsilon		Monticello, Florida	FL	Active	
EX 5962	Xi Epsilon Alpha		Paonia, Colorado	CO	Active	
EX 5965	Xi Zeta Lambda		Bowmanville, Ontario, Canada	ON	Active	
EX 5968	Xi Alpha Theta		Medicine Hat, Alberta, Canada	AB	Active	
EX 5974	Xi Omega Zeta		Sunray, Texas	TX	Active	
EX 5981	Xi Eta Lambda		McConnellsburg, Pennsylvania	PA	Active	
EX 5985	Xi Alpha Omega		Charleston, South Carolina	SC	Active	
EX 5990	Xi Alpha Beta		Rose Valley, Saskatchewan, Canada	SK	Active	
EX 5999	Xi Epsilon Upsilon		Allen, Oklahoma	OK	Active	
EX 6007	Xi Alpha Lambda		Lewistown, Montana	MT	Active	
EX 6008	Xi Iota Phi		Blue Springs, Missouri	MO	Active	
EX 6011	Xi Alpha Nu		Baker, Montana	MT	Active	
EX 6019	Xi Beta Delta		Maple Grove, Minnesota	MN	Active	
EX 6020	Xi Gamma Rho		Lenoir, North Carolina	NC	Active	
EX 6027	Xi Eta Xi		Edinboro, Pennsylvania	PA	Active	
EX 6032	Xi Upsilon		Anchor Point, Alaska	AK	Active	
EX 6055	Xi Gamma Pi		Ajo, Arizona	AZ	Active	
EX 6057	Xi Phi Theta		Turlock, California	CA	Active	
EX 6064	Xi Omega Xi		Ingleside, Texas	TX	Active	
EX 6069	Xi Phi Iota		Victorville, California	CA	Active	
EX 6073	Xi Delta Pi		Parksville, British Columbia, Canada	BC	Active	
EX 6081	Xi Beta Epsilon		Marshall, Minnesota	MN	Active	
EX 6085	Xi Delta Pi		Brocton, New York	NY	Active	
EX 6089	Xi Alpha Iota		Calgary, Alberta, Canada	AB	Active	
EX 6093	Xi Omega Sigma		McGregor, Texas	TX	Active	
EX 6096	Xi Beta Gamma		North Augusta, South Carolina	SC	Active	
EX 6104	Xi Eta Omicron		Pottstown, Pennsylvania	PA	Active	
EX 6106	Xi Lambda Mu		Streamwood, Illinois	IL	Active	
EX 6108	Xi Omega Upsilon		Greenville, Texas	TX	Active	
EX 6119	Xi Delta Kappa		Burns, Oregon	OR	Active	
EX 6120	Xi Pi		Sydney, Nova Scotia, Canada	NS	Active	
EX 6127	Xi Nu		Deer Lake, Newfoundland and Labrador, Canada	NL	Active	
EX 6129	Xi Gamma Sigma		Scottsdale, Arizona	AZ	Active	
EX 6132	Xi Lambda Nu		Altamont, Illinois	IL	Active	
EX 6136	Xi Alpha Sigma		Thermopolis, Wyoming	WY	Active	
EX 6141	Xi Mu Beta		Stuart, Florida	FL	Active	
EX 6143	Xi Alpha Alpha Beta		Plano, Texas	TX	Active	
EX 6145	Xi Delta Sigma		Vancouver, British Columbia, Canada	BC	Active	
EX 6148	Xi Gamma Upsilon		Alma, Nebraska	NE	Active	
EX 6149	Xi Eta Rho		Murray, Iowa	IA	Active	
EX 6151	Xi Eta Sigma		Gowrie, Iowa	IA	Active	
EX 6157	Xi Gamma Phi		Blair, Nebraska	NE	Active	
EX 6171	Xi Alpha Tau		Kemmerer, Wyoming	WY	Active	
EX 6172	Xi Zeta Sigma		North Bay, Ontario, Canada	ON	Active	
EX 6173	Xi Alpha Alpha Eta		Fort Worth, Texas	TX	Active	
EX 6177	Xi Kappa Delta		La Plata, Missouri	MO	Active	
EX 6186	Xi Beta Iota		Opelika, Alabama	AL	Active	
EX 6187	Xi Epsilon Delta		Salida, Colorado	CO	Active	
EX 6206	Xi Delta Mu		Madras, Oregon	OR	Active	
EX 6211	Xi Delta Rho		Le Roy, New York	NY	Active	
EX 6212	Xi Alpha Alpha Kappa		Sweetwater, Texas	TX	Active	
EX 6214	Xi Zeta Gamma		Mustang, Oklahoma	OK	Active	
EX 6223	Xi Eta Mu		Lansing, Kansas	KS	Active	
EX 6227	Xi Beta Kappa		Prattville, Alabama	AL	Active	
EX 6229	Xi Alpha Alpha Nu		Lampasas, Texas	TX	Active	
EX 6243	Xi Zeta Delta		Elk City, Oklahoma	OK	Active	
EX 6256	Xi Zeta Upsilon		Milton, Ontario, Canada	ON	Active	
EX 6257	Xi Mu		Londonderry, New Hampshire	NH	Active	
EX 6264	Xi Eta Psi		Grundy Center, Iowa	IA	Active	
EX 6265	Xi Zeta Omega		Petersburg, Indiana	IN	Active	
EX 6267	Xi Zeta Phi		Tweed, Ontario, Canada	ON	Active	
EX 6270	Xi Kappa Nu		Hale, Missouri	MO	Active	
EX 6273	Xi Delta Upsilon		Golden, British Columbia, Canada	BC	Active	
EX 6275	Xi Zeta Theta		Tulsa, Oklahoma	OK	Active	
EX 6290	Xi Delta Kappa		Florence, Kentucky	KY	Active	
EX 6294	Xi Eta Omicron		Great Bend, Kansas	KS	Active	
EX 6300	Xi Phi Phi		Oroville, California	CA	Active	
EX 6302	Xi Eta Rho		Spring Hill, Kansas	KS	Active	
EX 6305	Xi Eta Sigma		Topeka, Kansas	KS	Active	
EX 6307	Xi Alpha Omicron		St. Albert, Alberta, Canada	AB	Active	
EX 6314	Xi Eta Alpha		Aurora, Ontario, Canada	ON	Active	
EX 6320	Xi Theta Alpha		Russell, Iowa	IA	Active	
EX 6321	Xi Eta Tau		Harper, Kansas	KS	Active	
EX 6322	Xi Mu Rho		Navarre, Florida	FL	Active	
EX 6327	Xi Delta Chi		Creston, British Columbia, Canada	BC	Active	
EX 6352	Xi Rho		Kentville, Nova Scotia, Canada	NS	Active	
EX 6354	Xi Kappa Omicron		Kimberling City, Missouri	MO	Active	
EX 6357	Xi Alpha Beta Beta		Wimberley, Texas	TX	Active	
EX 6365	Xi Alpha Beta Gamma		Canyon, Texas	TX	Active	
EX 6369	Xi Kappa Rho		Savannah, Missouri	MO	Active	
EX 6375	Xi Zeta Lambda		Ponca City, Oklahoma	OK	Active	
EX 6377	Xi Delta Mu		Sulphur, Louisiana	LA	Active	
EX 6378	Xi Theta Gamma		Mount Pleasant, Iowa	IA	Active	
EX 6385	Xi Alpha Beta Zeta		Waco, Texas	TX	Active	
EX 6392	Xi Alpha Beta Eta		Seminole, Texas	TX	Active	
EX 6394	Xi Epsilon Mu		Chesapeake, Virginia	VA	Active	
EX 6402	Xi Alpha Beta Iota		Conroe, Texas	TX	Active	
EX 6408	Xi Gamma Omicron		Clarksville, Arkansas	AR	Active	
EX 6410	Xi Lambda Lambda		Canton, Ohio	OH	Active	
EX 6418	Xi Beta Zeta		Florence, South Carolina	SC	Active	
EX 6429	Xi Alpha Beta		Jamestown, North Dakota	ND	Active	
EX 6441	Xi Alpha Chi		Hill City, South Dakota	SD	Active	
EX 6453	Xi Delta Gamma		Winston-Salem, North Carolina	NC	Active	
EX 6454	Xi Delta Iota		Athens, Tennessee	TN	Active	
EX 6455	Xi Gamma Pi		Pocahontas, Arkansas	AR	Active	
EX 6472	Xi Delta Chi		Tybee Island, Georgia	GA	Active	
EX 6477	Xi Mu Gamma		Lincoln, Illinois	IL	Active	
EX 6479	Xi Delta Psi		Sequim, Washington	WA	Active	
EX 6480	Xi Gamma Sigma		Fort Smith, Arkansas	AR	Active	
EX 6488	Xi Delta Psi		Swainsboro, Georgia	GA	Active	
EX 6489	Xi Lambda Beta		Fairfax, Missouri	MO	Active	
EX 6493	Xi Lambda Delta		Hillsboro, Missouri	MO	Active	
EX 6497	Xi Lambda Epsilon		Lexington, Missouri	MO	Active	
EX 6503	Xi Lambda Zeta		Mount Vernon, Missouri	MO	Active	
EX 6506	Xi Epsilon Eta		Clearwater, British Columbia, Canada	BC	Active	
EX 6510	Xi Nu Gamma		Fort Pierce, Florida	FL	Active	
EX 6512	Xi Mu Epsilon		Princeton, Illinois	IL	Active	
EX 6516	Xi Epsilon Theta		Sidney, British Columbia, Canada	BC	Active	
EX 6517	Xi Delta Xi		Oakridge, Oregon	OR	Active	
EX 6520	Xi Lambda Eta		Dexter, Missouri	MO	Active	
EX 6521	Xi Eta Psi		Junction City, Kansas	KS	Active	
EX 6526	Xi Xi		Odessa, Texas	TX	Active	
EX 6529	Xi Beta Xi		McCalla, Alabama	AL	Active	
EX 6531	Xi Mu Zeta		Chatham, Illinois	IL	Active	
EX 6533	Xi Zeta Pi		Pryor, Oklahoma	OK	Active	
EX 6535	Xi Rho		Dauphin, Manitoba, Canada	MB	Active	
EX 6536	Xi Eta Phi		Pittsburgh, Pennsylvania	PA	Active	
EX 6545	Xi Alpha Xi		Columbus, Mississippi	MS	Active	
EX 6547	Xi Alpha Gamma		Valley City, North Dakota	ND	Active	
EX 6554	Xi Theta Kappa		Clear Lake, Iowa	IA	Active	
EX 6560	Xi Alpha Gamma Beta		Waxahachie, Texas	TX	Active	
EX 6561	Xi Epsilon Beta		Dublin, Georgia	GA	Active	
EX 6571	Xi Alpha Omega		Custer, South Dakota	SD	Active	
EX 6574	Xi Alpha Gamma Gamma		Huntsville, Texas	TX	Active	
EX 6576	Xi Epsilon Epsilon		Peachtree City, Georgia	GA	Active	
EX 6577	Xi Delta Eta		Carolina Beach, North Carolina	NC	Active	
EX 6581	Xi Delta Kappa		Memphis, Tennessee	TN	Active	
EX 6583	Xi Epsilon Theta		Pueblo, Colorado	CO	Active	
EX 6594	Xi Lambda Pi		Middletown, Ohio	OH	Active	
EX 6599	Xi Chi Eta		Turlock, California	CA	Active	
EX 6601	Xi Alpha Gamma Zeta		Baytown, Texas	TX	Active	
EX 6602	Xi Delta Omega		Everett, Washington	WA	Active	
EX 6608	Xi Lambda Pi		Creve Coeur, Missouri	MO	Active	
EX 6611	Xi Delta Lambda		Rocky Mount, North Carolina	NC	Active	
EX 6621	Xi Epsilon Alpha		Spokane, Washington	WA	Active	
EX 6626	Xi Alpha Gamma Lambda		Palestine, Texas	TX	Active	
EX 6636	Xi Mu Kappa		Shelbyville, Illinois	IL	Active	
EX 6637	Xi Epsilon Kappa		Chetwynd, British Columbia, Canada	BC	Active	
EX 6638	Xi Zeta Gamma		Coldwater, Michigan	MI	Active	
EX 6645	Xi Nu Kappa		Keystone Heights, Florida	FL	Active	
EX 6647	Xi Mu Lambda		Dongola, Illinois	IL	Active	
EX 6648	Xi Epsilon Mu		Maple Ridge, British Columbia, Canada	BC	Active	
EX 6662	Xi Epsilon Iota		Marietta, Georgia	GA	Active	
EX 6663	Xi Phi		Wrangell, Alaska	AK	Active	
EX 6664	Xi Theta Xi		Spirit Lake, Iowa	IA	Active	
EX 6675	Xi Alpha Gamma Omicron		The Colony, Texas	TX	Active	
EX 6679	Xi Alpha Omicron		Moss Point, Mississippi	MS	Active	
EX 6680	Xi Epsilon Kappa		Douglasville, Georgia	GA	Active	
EX 6682	Xi Beta Omicron		Decatur, Alabama	AL	Active	
EX 6695	Xi Eta Zeta		Terre Haute, Indiana	IN	Active	
EX 6703	Xi Nu Sigma		Avon Park, Florida	FL	Active	
EX 6705	Xi Delta Nu		Lexington, Kentucky	KY	Active	
EX 6709	Xi Theta Epsilon		Downs, Kansas	KS	Active	
EX 6710	Xi Nu Tau		Key West, Florida	FL	Active	
EX 6711	Xi Lambda Chi		Sweet Springs, Missouri	MO	Active	
EX 6715	Xi Mu Pi		Edwardsville, Illinois	IL	Active	
EX 6716	Xi Chi Lambda		El Centro, California	CA	Active	
EX 6718	Xi Beta Xi		Mountain Home, Idaho	ID	Active	
EX 6721	Xi Nu Upsilon		Inverness, Florida	FL	Active	
EX 6722	Xi Beta Alpha		Sherwood Park, Alberta, Canada	AB	Active	
EX 6723	Xi Beta Tau		DeForest, Wisconsin	WI	Active	
EX 6727	Xi Theta Eta		Mission, Kansas	KS	Active	
EX 6732	Xi Lambda Upsilon		Chillicothe, Ohio	OH	Active	
EX 6735	Xi Delta Rho		Asheville, North Carolina	NC	Active	
EX 6739	Xi Lambda Psi		Dexter, Missouri	MO	Active	
EX 6745	Xi Theta Theta		Leoti, Kansas	KS	Active	
EX 6755	Xi Theta Tau		Ireton, Iowa	IA	Active	
EX 6763	Xi Gamma Sigma		Hamlin, West Virginia	WV	Active	
EX 6767	Xi Chi Mu		San Jose, California	CA	Active	
EX 6768	Xi Mu Beta		Lawson, Missouri	MO	Active	
EX 6771	Xi Eta Theta		Indianapolis, Indiana	IN	Active	
EX 6777	Xi Gamma Omega		Boerne, Texas	TX	Active	
EX 6791	Xi Sigma		Lewes, Delaware	DE	Active	
EX 6797	Xi Beta Omicron		Bonners Ferry, Idaho	ID	Active	
EX 6799	Xi Alpha Delta Delta		Edna, Texas	TX	Active	
EX 6800	Xi Zeta Chi		McAlester, Oklahoma	OK	Active	
EX 6801	Xi Gamma Tau		Keyser, West Virginia	WV	Active	
EX 6804	Xi Nu Omega		Okeechobee, Florida	FL	Active	
EX 6807	Xi Epsilon Omicron		Colquitt, Georgia	GA	Active	
EX 6808	Xi Mu Epsilon		Cape Girardeau, Missouri	MO	Active	
EX 6814	Xi Mu Zeta		St. Peters, Missouri	MO	Active	
EX 6819	Xi Mu Upsilon		Libertyville, Illinois	IL	Active	
EX 6827	Xi Epsilon Lambda		Greeley, Colorado	CO	Active	
EX 6831	Xi Alpha Delta Lambda		Baytown, Texas	TX	Active	
EX 6832	Xi Mu Theta		Maysville, Missouri	MO	Active	
EX 6839	Xi Mu Kappa		Stanberry, Missouri	MO	Active	
EX 6841	Xi Mu Phi		Canton, Illinois	IL	Active	
EX 6857	Xi Nu Theta		Washington, Missouri	MO	Active	
EX 6863	Xi Mu Xi		Bonne Terre, Missouri	MO	Active	
EX 6866	Xi Epsilon Rho		Carrollton, Georgia	GA	Active	
EX 6874	Xi Mu Psi		Moline, Illinois	IL	Active	
EX 6879	Xi Nu Alpha		Lena, Illinois	IL	Active	
EX 6884	Xi Eta Kappa		Fort Wayne, Indiana	IN	Active	
EX 6889	Xi Delta Sigma		Gold Beach, Oregon	OR	Active	
EX 6895	Xi Theta Lambda		Cawker City, Kansas	KS	Active	
EX 6900	Xi Gamma Delta		Farmington, New Mexico	NM	Active	
EX 6905	Xi Delta Zeta		Tempe, Arizona	AZ	Active	
EX 6908	Xi Beta Omega		Vineland, New Jersey	NJ	Active	
EX 6914	Xi Epsilon Tau		Yorktown, Virginia	VA	Active	
EX 6922	Xi Mu Gamma		Manitou Beach, Michigan	MI	Active	
EX 6923	Xi Eta Pi		Gravenhurst, Ontario, Canada	ON	Active	
EX 6925	Xi Eta Delta		Savannah, Georgia	GA	Active	
EX 6926	Xi Tau		Wilmington, Delaware	DE	Active	
EX 6927	Xi Beta Alpha		Augusta, Maine	ME	Active	
EX 6928	Xi Theta Omicron		Galena, Kansas	KS	Active	
EX 6929	Xi Theta Alpha		Uniontown, Pennsylvania	PA	Active	
EX 6962	Xi Theta Psi		Mission, Kansas	KS	Active	
EX 6964	Xi Epsilon Psi		Chesapeake, Virginia	VA	Active	
EX 6966	Xi Nu Gamma		Carbondale, Illinois	IL	Active	
EX 6973	Xi Alpha Delta Omega		Kilgore, Texas	TX	Active	
EX 6985	Xi Lambda Psi		Bellevue, Ohio	OH	Active	
EX 6986	Xi Chi Rho		Manteca, California	CA	Active	
EX 6996	Xi Gamma		Essex Junction, Vermont	VT	Active	
EX 6998	Xi Beta Eta		Olney, Maryland	MD	Active	
EX 6999	Xi Lambda Omega		Toledo, Ohio	OH	Active	
EX 7004	Xi Epsilon Nu		Monument, Colorado	CO	Active	
EX 7020	Xi Eta Nu		Lebanon, Indiana	IN	Active	
EX 7022	Xi Iota Beta		Hays, Kansas	KS	Active	
EX 7029	Xi Xi Iota		Sebring, Florida	FL	Active	
EX 7046	Xi Theta Zeta		Hanover, Pennsylvania	PA	Active	
EX 7053	Xi Delta Beta		Pine Bluff, Arkansas	AR	Active	
EX 7055	Xi Delta Omega		Forest City, North Carolina	NC	Active	
EX 7059	Xi Alpha Upsilon		Stansbury Park, Utah	UT	Active	
EX 7063	Xi Nu Tau		Laurie, Missouri	MO	Active	
EX 7065	Xi Eta Xi		Rushville, Indiana	IN	Active	
EX 7067	Xi Beta Lambda		Leesville, South Carolina	SC	Active	
EX 7074	Xi Epsilon Epsilon		Kent, Washington	WA	Active	
EX 7077	Xi Eta Psi		Grimsby, Ontario, Canada	ON	Active	
EX 7090	Xi Nu Phi		Cape Girardeau, Missouri	MO	Active	
EX 7092	Xi Theta Chi		Chesapeake, Virginia	VA	Active	
EX 7096	Xi Chi Chi		Murrieta, California	CA	Active	
EX 7098	Xi Zeta Beta		Yorktown, Virginia	VA	Active	
EX 7102	Xi Epsilon Xi		Parker, Colorado	CO	Active	
EX 7103	Xi Lambda Psi		Englewood, Florida	FL	Active	
EX 7108	Xi Beta Nu		Apple Valley, Minnesota	MN	Active	
EX 7113	Xi Alpha Epsilon Pi		Houston, Texas	TX	Active	
EX 7116	Xi Zeta Iota		Williamsburg, Virginia	VA	Active	
EX 7117	Xi Beta Mu		Myrtle Beach, South Carolina	SC	Active	
EX 7128	Xi Xi Nu		Pensacola, Florida	FL	Active	
EX 7130	Xi Iota Epsilon		McPherson, Kansas	KS	Active	
EX 7132	Xi Eta Alpha		Welch, Oklahoma	OK	Active	
EX 7139	Xi Epsilon Omega		Warner Robins, Georgia	GA	Active	
EX 7141	Xi Epsilon Zeta		Puyallup, Washington	WA	Active	
EX 7143	Xi Theta Beta		Bobcaygeon, Ontario, Canada	ON	Active	
EX 7146	Xi Xi Gamma		Albany, Missouri	MO	Active	
EX 7152	Xi Alpha Epsilon Sigma		Liberty, Texas	TX	Active	
EX 7154	Xi Iota Zeta		Mission, Kansas	KS	Active	
EX 7169	Xi Delta Upsilon		Delhi, Louisiana	LA	Active	
EX 7173	Xi Delta Pi		Gilbert, Arizona	AZ	Active	
EX 7175	Xi Theta Delta		Oshawa, Ontario, Canada	ON	Active	
EX 7185	Xi Epsilon Alpha		Thomasville, North Carolina	NC	Active	
EX 7186	Xi Iota Lambda		Medicine Lodge, Kansas	KS	Active	
EX 7189	Xi Zeta Delta		Virginia Beach, Virginia	VA	Active	
EX 7194	Xi Eta Rho		Fort Wayne, Indiana	IN	Active	
EX 7206	Xi Xi Mu		Cameron, Missouri	MO	Active	
EX 7209	Xi Zeta Delta		Washington, Georgia	GA	Active	
EX 7211	Xi Theta Epsilon		Cobourg, Ontario, Canada	ON	Active	
EX 7212	Xi Psi Alpha		Pioneer, California	CA	Active	
EX 7218	Xi Beta Epsilon		Saratoga, Wyoming	WY	Active	
EX 7219	Xi Gamma Chi		Ona, West Virginia	WV	Active	
EX 7227	Xi Theta Zeta		Paris, Ontario, Canada	ON	Active	
EX 7230	Xi Delta Upsilon		Madras, Oregon	OR	Active	
EX 7237	Xi Nu Kappa		Morris, Illinois	IL	Active	
EX 7249	Xi Gamma Psi		Parkersburg, West Virginia	WV	Active	
EX 7255	Xi Delta Sigma		Surprise, Arizona	AZ	Active	
EX 7256	Xi Nu Lambda		Geneseo, Illinois	IL	Active	
EX 7259	Xi Epsilon Eta		Yakima, Washington	WA	Active	
EX 7262	Xi Iota Eta		Marion, Iowa	IA	Active	
EX 7264	Xi Alpha Epsilon Tau		Corpus Christi, Texas	TX	Active	
EX 7267	Xi Psi Beta		Windsor, California	CA	Active	
EX 7268	Xi Delta Epsilon		Fayetteville, Arkansas	AR	Active	
EX 7269	Xi Delta Chi		Baton Rouge, Louisiana	LA	Active	
EX 7270	Xi Zeta Omicron		Yorktown, Virginia	VA	Active	
EX 7272	Xi Delta Tau		Tucson, Arizona	AZ	Active	
EX 7280	Xi Beta Theta		Pasadena, Maryland	MD	Active	
EX 7281	Xi Alpha Epsilon Phi		Canyon, Texas	TX	Active	
EX 7283	Xi Xi Psi		The Villages, Florida	FL	Active	
EX 7284	Xi Nu Mu		Chester, Illinois	IL	Active	
EX 7285	Xi Alpha Epsilon Omega		Katy, Texas	TX	Active	
EX 7286	Xi Zeta Rho		Roanoke, Virginia	VA	Active	

=== Preceptor chapters ===
Following are the active Preceptor chapters of Beta Sigma Phi as of 2026.

Number	Chapter	Charter date and range	Location	State, province, or region	Status	Ref.
XP 100	Preceptor Alpha		Pocatello, Idaho	ID	Active	
XP 101	Preceptor Alpha		Waynesboro, Pennsylvania	PA	Active	
XP 102	Preceptor Alpha		Carson City, Nevada	NV	Active	
XP 104	Preceptor Alpha		Watertown, New York	NY	Active	
XP 107	Preceptor Alpha		Peoria, Illinois	IL	Active	
XP 111	Preceptor Gamma		Boulder City, Nevada	NV	Active	
XP 113	Preceptor Alpha		Little Rock, Arkansas	AR	Active	
XP 115	Preceptor Alpha		Charleston, West Virginia	WV	Active	
XP 117	Preceptor Beta		Marshall, Missouri	MO	Active	
XP 118	Preceptor Alpha		Spokane, Washington	WA	Active	
XP 121	Preceptor Alpha		Chesterland, Ohio	OH	Active	
XP 124	Preceptor Gamma		Lawrence, Kansas	KS	Active	
XP 128	Preceptor Gamma		Hannibal, Missouri	MO	Active	
XP 131	Preceptor Beta		Fairmont, West Virginia	WV	Active	
XP 133	Preceptor Alpha		Manchester, New Hampshire	NH	Active	
XP 137	Preceptor Gamma		Longview, Washington	WA	Active	
XP 141	Preceptor Beta		Bismarck, North Dakota	ND	Active	
XP 142	Preceptor Beta		Portland, Oregon	OR	Active	
XP 144	Preceptor Gamma		Oakland, California	CA	Active	
XP 152	Preceptor Delta		Tacoma, Washington	WA	Active	
XP 153	Preceptor Alpha		Medicine Hat, Alberta, Canada	AB	Active	
XP 155	Preceptor Alpha		Albuquerque, New Mexico	NM	Active	
XP 156	Preceptor Beta		Hopewell, Virginia	VA	Active	
XP 159	Preceptor Gamma		Baytown, Texas	TX	Active	
XP 161	Preceptor Delta		Bethlehem, Pennsylvania	PA	Active	
XP 170	Preceptor Alpha		Cheyenne, Wyoming	WY	Active	
XP 171	Preceptor Alpha		Milford, Delaware	DE	Active	
XP 195	Preceptor Delta		Big Spring, Texas	TX	Active	
XP 196	Preceptor Alpha		Trenton, New Jersey	NJ	Active	
XP 197	Preceptor Beta		Butte, Montana	MT	Active	
XP 199	Preceptor Delta		Lafayette, Indiana	IN	Active	
XP 203	Preceptor Gamma		Council Bluffs, Iowa	IA	Active	
XP 206	Preceptor Eta		Kent, Washington	WA	Active	
XP 211	Preceptor Gamma		Key West, Florida	FL	Active	
XP 215	Preceptor Delta		Des Moines, Iowa	IA	Active	
XP 223	Preceptor Epsilon		Fort Lauderdale, Florida	FL	Active	
XP 225	Preceptor Zeta		Lakeland, Florida	FL	Active	
XP 226	Preceptor Zeta		Beaumont, Texas	TX	Active	
XP 227	Preceptor Delta		Centralia, Illinois	IL	Active	
XP 229	Preceptor Xi		Long Beach, California	CA	Active	
XP 232	Preceptor Gamma		Salt Lake City, Utah	UT	Active	
XP 237	Preceptor Epsilon		Sedan, Kansas	KS	Active	
XP 238	Preceptor Gamma		Billings, Montana	MT	Active	
XP 239	Preceptor Zeta		Carthage, Missouri	MO	Active	
XP 240	Preceptor Eta		Carrollton, Missouri	MO	Active	
XP 242	Preceptor Beta		Macon, Georgia	GA	Active	
XP 245	Preceptor Zeta		Marysville, Kansas	KS	Active	
XP 254	Preceptor Zeta		Roseburg, Oregon	OR	Active	
XP 256	Preceptor Epsilon		Decatur, Illinois	IL	Active	
XP 258	Preceptor Theta		Jefferson City, Missouri	MO	Active	
XP 261	Preceptor Zeta		Pottsville, Pennsylvania	PA	Active	
XP 263	Preceptor Beta		Kearney, Nebraska	NE	Active	
XP 266	Preceptor Sigma		San Jose, California	CA	Active	
XP 268	Preceptor Eta		Leadville, Colorado	CO	Active	
XP 282	Preceptor Beta		New Orleans, Louisiana	LA	Active	
XP 285	Preceptor Nu		Trenton, Missouri	MO	Active	
XP 287	Preceptor Delta		Montgomery, Alabama	AL	Active	
XP 299	Preceptor Eta		Medford, Oregon	OR	Active	
XP 300	Preceptor Delta		Belle Fourche, South Dakota	SD	Active	
XP 305	Preceptor Gamma		Vancouver, British Columbia, Canada	BC	Active	
XP 308	Preceptor Delta		Kamloops, British Columbia, Canada	BC	Active	
XP 309	Preceptor Delta		Lewiston, Idaho	ID	Active	
XP 315	Preceptor Beta		Moose Jaw, Saskatchewan, Canada	SK	Active	
XP 318	Preceptor Epsilon		Carlsbad, New Mexico	NM	Active	
XP 323	Preceptor Theta		Litchfield, Illinois	IL	Active	
XP 324	Preceptor Gamma		Edmonton, Alberta, Canada	AB	Active	
XP 327	Preceptor Epsilon		Spencer, Iowa	IA	Active	
XP 330	Preceptor Epsilon		Spearfish, South Dakota	SD	Active	
XP 332	Preceptor Kappa		Montrose, Colorado	CO	Active	
XP 347	Preceptor Kappa		Pratt, Kansas	KS	Active	
XP 351	Preceptor Nu		Houston, Texas	TX	Active	
XP 354	Preceptor Pi		Columbia, Missouri	MO	Active	
XP 357	Preceptor Beta		Vineland, New Jersey	NJ	Active	
XP 361	Preceptor Gamma		Swift Current, Saskatchewan, Canada	SK	Active	
XP 364	Preceptor Kappa		Ludington, Michigan	MI	Active	
XP 365	Preceptor Delta		Lincoln, Nebraska	NE	Active	
XP 368	Preceptor Iota		Tampa, Florida	FL	Active	
XP 371	Preceptor Delta		Springfield, Virginia	VA	Active	
XP 379	Preceptor Epsilon		Alexander City, Alabama	AL	Active	
XP 382	Preceptor Theta		Hood River, Oregon	OR	Active	
XP 385	Preceptor Gamma		Tulsa, Oklahoma	OK	Active	
XP 387	Preceptor Nu		Salina, Kansas	KS	Active	
XP 388	Preceptor Rho		Richland, Washington	WA	Active	
XP 390	Preceptor Epsilon		Edmonton, Alberta, Canada	AB	Active	
XP 393	Preceptor Rho		New Braunfels, Texas	TX	Active	
XP 396	Preceptor Alpha		Halifax, Nova Scotia, Canada	NS	Active	
XP 403	Preceptor Gamma		Manchester, Connecticut	CT	Active	
XP 407	Preceptor Alpha		Presque Isle, Maine	ME	Active	
XP 409	Preceptor Gamma		Casper, Wyoming	WY	Active	
XP 410	Preceptor Xi		Baxter Springs, Kansas	KS	Active	
XP 411	Preceptor Alpha Gamma		Paso Robles, California	CA	Active	
XP 413	Preceptor Iota		Eugene, Oregon	OR	Active	
XP 415	Preceptor Omicron		Littleton, Colorado	CO	Active	
XP 420	Preceptor Gamma		Juneau, Alaska	AK	Active	
XP 421	Preceptor Sigma		Excelsior Springs, Missouri	MO	Active	
XP 422	Preceptor Nu		Lima, Ohio	OH	Active	
XP 444	Preceptor Mu		Lewistown, Pennsylvania	PA	Active	
XP 459	Preceptor Nu		Pontiac, Michigan	MI	Active	
XP 461	Preceptor Epsilon		Kalispell, Montana	MT	Active	
XP 466	Preceptor Kappa		North Vancouver, British Columbia, Canada	BC	Active	
XP 469	Preceptor Lambda		Kitchener, Ontario, Canada	ON	Active	
XP 477	Preceptor Delta		Madison, Wisconsin	WI	Active	
XP 479	Preceptor Upsilon		Center, Texas	TX	Active	
XP 484	Preceptor Phi		San Antonio, Texas	TX	Active	
XP 486	Preceptor Nu		Hobbs, New Mexico	NM	Active	
XP 487	Preceptor Chi		Pampa, Texas	TX	Active	
XP 503	Preceptor Sigma		Bryan, Ohio	OH	Active	
XP 508	Preceptor Zeta		Great Falls, Montana	MT	Active	
XP 509	Preceptor Beta		Winnipeg, Manitoba, Canada	MB	Active	
XP 512	Preceptor Pi		Great Bend, Kansas	KS	Active	
XP 516	Preceptor Tau		Cocoa, Florida	FL	Active	
XP 518	Preceptor Alpha Alpha		Hereford, Texas	TX	Active	
XP 528	Preceptor Alpha Beta		Dallas, Texas	TX	Active	
XP 532	Preceptor Gamma		Halifax, Nova Scotia, Canada	NS	Active	
XP 534	Preceptor Beta		Shelbyville, Tennessee	TN	Active	
XP 541	Preceptor Psi		Nevada, Missouri	MO	Active	
XP 545	Preceptor Alpha Rho		Santa Maria, California	CA	Active	
XP 547	Preceptor Pi		Portland, Oregon	OR	Active	
XP 550	Preceptor Zeta		Winchester, Virginia	VA	Active	
XP 553	Preceptor Alpha Zeta		Arlington, Texas	TX	Active	
XP 554	Preceptor Alpha Eta		La Porte, Texas	TX	Active	
XP 557	Preceptor Omicron		Thunder Bay, Ontario, Canada	ON	Active	
XP 562	Preceptor Alpha Iota		Texas City, Texas	TX	Active	
XP 565	Preceptor Theta		Eagle Grove, Iowa	IA	Active	
XP 577	Preceptor Tau		Norwalk, Ohio	OH	Active	
XP 596	Preceptor Alpha Alpha		Seattle, Washington	WA	Active	
XP 603	Preceptor Psi		Aurora, Colorado	CO	Active	
XP 604	Preceptor Psi		Wilmington, Ohio	OH	Active	
XP 606	Preceptor Beta Alpha		Escondido, California	CA	Active	
XP 608	Preceptor Beta Beta		Lakewood, California	CA	Active	
XP 609	Preceptor Zeta		Warner Robins, Georgia	GA	Active	
XP 612	Preceptor Omega		Lorain, Ohio	OH	Active	
XP 626	Preceptor Iota		Globe, Arizona	AZ	Active	
XP 627	Preceptor Omega		Denver, Colorado	CO	Active	
XP 628	Preceptor Alpha Gamma		Van Wert, Ohio	OH	Active	
XP 629	Preceptor Alpha Beta		Mount Vernon, Ohio	OH	Active	
XP 630	Preceptor Zeta		Fallon, Nevada	NV	Active	
XP 632	Preceptor Phi		Lawrence, Kansas	KS	Active	
XP 633	Preceptor Epsilon		Lawton, Oklahoma	OK	Active	
XP 637	Preceptor Sigma		Rockford, Illinois	IL	Active	
XP 638	Preceptor Alpha Beta		Colorado Springs, Colorado	CO	Active	
XP 639	Preceptor Alpha Beta		Renton, Washington	WA	Active	
XP 650	Preceptor Upsilon		Springfield, Illinois	IL	Active	
XP 652	Preceptor Theta		Buhl, Idaho	ID	Active	
XP 659	Preceptor Alpha Delta		Macon, Missouri	MO	Active	
XP 664	Preceptor Psi		Rochester, Michigan	MI	Active	
XP 666	Preceptor Chi		Mount Vernon, Illinois	IL	Active	
XP 673	Preceptor Omega		Pontiac, Michigan	MI	Active	
XP 679	Preceptor Alpha Epsilon		Lake Winnebago, Missouri	MO	Active	
XP 691	Preceptor Beta Kappa		Alhambra, California	CA	Active	
XP 695	Preceptor Omega		Alton, Illinois	IL	Active	
XP 696	Preceptor Alpha Zeta		Grand Junction, Colorado	CO	Active	
XP 703	Preceptor Xi		Lafayette, Indiana	IN	Active	
XP 709	Preceptor Gamma		Memphis, Tennessee	TN	Active	
XP 716	Preceptor Beta Xi		San Diego, California	CA	Active	
XP 724	Preceptor Beta Rho		Lancaster, California	CA	Active	
XP 725	Preceptor Chi		Tallahassee, Florida	FL	Active	
XP 726	Preceptor Alpha Theta		Cortez, Colorado	CO	Active	
XP 732	Preceptor Psi		Ottawa, Kansas	KS	Active	
XP 734	Preceptor Alpha Epsilon		Longview, Washington	WA	Active	
XP 739	Preceptor Lambda		Cedar Rapids, Iowa	IA	Active	
XP 741	Preceptor Alpha Iota		Englewood, Colorado	CO	Active	
XP 744	Preceptor Kappa		Mullens, West Virginia	WV	Active	
XP 753	Preceptor Mu		Knoxville, Iowa	IA	Active	
XP 754	Preceptor Gamma Beta		Modesto, California	CA	Active	
XP 768	Preceptor Kappa		Charlottesville, Virginia	VA	Active	
XP 772	Preceptor Chi		Sarnia, Ontario, Canada	ON	Active	
XP 774	Preceptor Chi		Coquille, Oregon	OR	Active	
XP 778	Preceptor Alpha Kappa		Fort Collins, Colorado	CO	Active	
XP 781	Preceptor Omega		Mississauga, Ontario, Canada	ON	Active	
XP 785	Preceptor Alpha Upsilon		Amarillo, Texas	TX	Active	
XP 795	Preceptor Alpha Gamma		Harrisburg, Illinois	IL	Active	
XP 796	Preceptor Alpha		Charlottetown, Prince Edward Island, Canada	PE	Active	
XP 798	Preceptor Gamma		Souris, Manitoba, Canada	MB	Active	
XP 799	Preceptor Kappa		Nampa, Idaho	ID	Active	
XP 812	Preceptor Lambda		Parkersburg, West Virginia	WV	Active	
XP 844	Preceptor Theta		Edmonton, Alberta, Canada	AB	Active	
XP 852	Preceptor Alpha Alpha		Wichita, Kansas	KS	Active	
XP 859	Preceptor Alpha Epsilon		Carbondale, Illinois	IL	Active	
XP 863	Preceptor Alpha Zeta		Brantford, Ontario, Canada	ON	Active	
XP 866	Preceptor Gamma Sigma		San Fernando, California	CA	Active	
XP 867	Preceptor Alpha Eta		Ottawa, Ontario, Canada	ON	Active	
XP 873	Preceptor Tau		Silver City, New Mexico	NM	Active	
XP 875	Preceptor Alpha Eta		Du Quoin, Illinois	IL	Active	
XP 878	Preceptor Alpha Gamma		Wichita, Kansas	KS	Active	
XP 882	Preceptor Alpha Nu		Shelby, Ohio	OH	Active	
XP 886	Preceptor Beta Epsilon		Seguin, Texas	TX	Active	
XP 891	Preceptor Alpha Theta		Sarasota, Florida	FL	Active	
XP 893	Preceptor Epsilon		Nashville, Tennessee	TN	Active	
XP 894	Preceptor Gamma Psi		Vacaville, California	CA	Active	
XP 897	Preceptor Mu		Emmett, Idaho	ID	Active	
XP 909	Preceptor Alpha Epsilon		The Dalles, Oregon	OR	Active	
XP 916	Preceptor Eta		Menomonie, Wisconsin	WI	Active	
XP 919	Preceptor Beta Lambda		McAllen, Texas	TX	Active	
XP 928	Preceptor Alpha Delta		Muskegon, Michigan	MI	Active	
XP 931	Preceptor Delta Gamma		Oxnard, California	CA	Active	
XP 933	Preceptor Delta Epsilon		Riverside, California	CA	Active	
XP 936	Preceptor Alpha Zeta		Toledo, Oregon	OR	Active	
XP 939	Preceptor Alpha Kappa		Freeport, Illinois	IL	Active	
XP 940	Preceptor Upsilon		Lovington, New Mexico	NM	Active	
XP 945	Preceptor Kappa		Grand Island, Nebraska	NE	Active	
XP 949	Preceptor Delta Theta		Torrance, California	CA	Active	
XP 957	Preceptor Beta Nu		Center, Texas	TX	Active	
XP 962	Preceptor Alpha Pi		Sandusky, Ohio	OH	Active	
XP 973	Preceptor Alpha Eta		Coos Bay, Oregon	OR	Active	
XP 980	Preceptor Iota		Vinita, Oklahoma	OK	Active	
XP 981	Preceptor Kappa		Broken Arrow, Oklahoma	OK	Active	
XP 982	Preceptor Rho		Waterloo, Iowa	IA	Active	
XP 993	Preceptor Gamma		St. John's, Newfoundland and Labrador, Canada	NL	Active	
XP 995	Preceptor Eta		Lake Charles, Louisiana	LA	Active	
XP 998	Preceptor Alpha Xi		Carmi, Illinois	IL	Active	
XP 1001	Preceptor Alpha Omicron		Pekin, Illinois	IL	Active	
XP 1004	Preceptor Lambda		Fremont, Nebraska	NE	Active	
XP 1017	Preceptor Epsilon		Brandon, Manitoba, Canada	MB	Active	
XP 1022	Preceptor Alpha Tau		Independence, Missouri	MO	Active	
XP 1039	Preceptor Delta Phi		Sonora, California	CA	Active	
XP 1042	Preceptor Alpha Xi		Oviedo, Florida	FL	Active	
XP 1048	Preceptor Alpha Iota		Olathe, Kansas	KS	Active	
XP 1051	Preceptor Upsilon		New Westminster, British Columbia, Canada	BC	Active	
XP 1058	Preceptor Omicron		Roanoke, Virginia	VA	Active	
XP 1059	Preceptor Alpha Phi		Paris, Missouri	MO	Active	
XP 1064	Preceptor Alpha Kappa		Junction City, Kansas	KS	Active	
XP 1065	Preceptor Alpha Psi		Stanberry, Missouri	MO	Active	
XP 1068	Preceptor Epsilon		Burlington, North Carolina	NC	Active	
XP 1080	Preceptor Alpha Lambda		Emporia, Kansas	KS	Active	
XP 1106	Preceptor Alpha Mu		Fort Frances, Ontario, Canada	ON	Active	
XP 1123	Preceptor Epsilon		Prince Albert, Saskatchewan, Canada	SK	Active	
XP 1127	Preceptor Alpha Nu		Oshawa, Ontario, Canada	ON	Active	
XP 1136	Preceptor Epsilon Zeta		Merced, California	CA	Active	
XP 1150	Preceptor Delta		Gulfport, Mississippi	MS	Active	
XP 1151	Preceptor Gamma Gamma		San Antonio, Texas	TX	Active	
XP 1154	Preceptor Omega		Belmond, Iowa	IA	Active	
XP 1157	Preceptor Gamma Delta		Hurst, Texas	TX	Active	
XP 1159	Preceptor Epsilon Kappa		Redding, California	CA	Active	
XP 1186	Preceptor Zeta		Fargo, North Dakota	ND	Active	
XP 1190	Preceptor Gamma		Concord, New Hampshire	NH	Active	
XP 1204	Preceptor Alpha Mu		Mission, Kansas	KS	Active	
XP 1208	Preceptor Sigma		Norfolk, Virginia	VA	Active	
XP 1209	Preceptor Zeta		Rock Hill, South Carolina	SC	Active	
XP 1211	Preceptor Zeta		Anchorage, Alaska	AK	Active	
XP 1216	Preceptor Alpha Beta		Garner, Iowa	IA	Active	
XP 1217	Preceptor Alpha Chi		Federal Way, Washington	WA	Active	
XP 1225	Preceptor Alpha Nu		Pratt, Kansas	KS	Active	
XP 1232	Preceptor Upsilon		Portsmouth, Virginia	VA	Active	
XP 1234	Preceptor Gamma Mu		Lubbock, Texas	TX	Active	
XP 1235	Preceptor Alpha Psi		Vandalia, Illinois	IL	Active	
XP 1258	Preceptor Alpha Omega		Sedro-Woolley, Washington	WA	Active	
XP 1266	Preceptor Kappa		Superior, Wisconsin	WI	Active	
XP 1273	Preceptor Kappa		Lexington, Kentucky	KY	Active	
XP 1280	Preceptor Alpha Omicron		Mississauga, Ontario, Canada	ON	Active	
XP 1283	Preceptor Alpha Pi		Oakville, Ontario, Canada	ON	Active	
XP 1285	Preceptor Alpha Pi		Clare, Michigan	MI	Active	
XP 1292	Preceptor Zeta Eta		Long Beach, California	CA	Active	
XP 1293	Preceptor Alpha Sigma		Kitchener, Ontario, Canada	ON	Active	
XP 1295	Preceptor Alpha Tau		Paris, Ontario, Canada	ON	Active	
XP 1309	Preceptor Lambda		Drumheller, Alberta, Canada	AB	Active	
XP 1310	Preceptor Iota		Helena, Montana	MT	Active	
XP 1313	Preceptor Gamma Sigma		Gonzales, Texas	TX	Active	
XP 1321	Preceptor Omega		Dawson Creek, British Columbia, Canada	BC	Active	
XP 1326	Preceptor Beta Gamma		Bremerton, Washington	WA	Active	
XP 1330	Preceptor Kappa		Huron, South Dakota	SD	Active	
XP 1333	Preceptor Beta Delta		Cheney, Washington	WA	Active	
XP 1334	Preceptor Gamma Upsilon		Odessa, Texas	TX	Active	
XP 1336	Preceptor Eta		Ketchikan, Alaska	AK	Active	
XP 1337	Preceptor Gamma Phi		Amarillo, Texas	TX	Active	
XP 1340	Preceptor Alpha Upsilon		Longmont, Colorado	CO	Active	
XP 1350	Preceptor Alpha Zeta		Nevada, Iowa	IA	Active	
XP 1353	Preceptor Beta Iota		Marietta, Ohio	OH	Active	
XP 1364	Preceptor Omega		Anthony, New Mexico	NM	Active	
XP 1381	Preceptor Beta Mu		Carterville, Illinois	IL	Active	
XP 1382	Preceptor Alpha Kappa		Indianapolis, Indiana	IN	Active	
XP 1383	Preceptor Alpha Nu		The Dalles, Oregon	OR	Active	
XP 1399	Preceptor Beta Nu		Chester, Illinois	IL	Active	
XP 1402	Preceptor Pi		Tulsa, Oklahoma	OK	Active	
XP 1403	Preceptor Delta Gamma		El Campo, Texas	TX	Active	
XP 1406	Preceptor Eta		North Charleston, South Carolina	SC	Active	
XP 1407	Preceptor Iota		Florence, Alabama	AL	Active	
XP 1412	Preceptor Omicron		Sandpoint, Idaho	ID	Active	
XP 1422	Preceptor Alpha Psi		St. Catharines, Ontario, Canada	ON	Active	
XP 1423	Preceptor Alpha Mu		Williamsport, Pennsylvania	PA	Active	
XP 1425	Preceptor Delta Epsilon		Tyler, Texas	TX	Active	
XP 1428	Preceptor Lambda		Ely, Nevada	NV	Active	
XP 1433	Preceptor Alpha Eta		Creston, Iowa	IA	Active	
XP 1447	Preceptor Eta		Yorkton, Saskatchewan, Canada	SK	Active	
XP 1449	Preceptor Pi		Burley, Idaho	ID	Active	
XP 1454	Preceptor Beta Omicron		Arlington Heights, Illinois	IL	Active	
XP 1455	Preceptor Alpha Lambda		La Porte, Indiana	IN	Active	
XP 1461	Preceptor Lambda		Bowie, Maryland	MD	Active	
XP 1465	Preceptor Alpha Sigma		Kansas City, Kansas	KS	Active	
XP 1469	Preceptor Alpha Tau		Haysville, Kansas	KS	Active	
XP 1474	Preceptor Epsilon		Duluth, Minnesota	MN	Active	
XP 1478	Preceptor Theta		Webster, Massachusetts	MA	Active	
XP 1486	Preceptor Beta Alpha		London, Ontario, Canada	ON	Active	
XP 1489	Preceptor Alpha Gamma		New Westminster, British Columbia, Canada	BC	Active	
XP 1492	Preceptor Alpha Omicron		Franklin, Pennsylvania	PA	Active	
XP 1502	Preceptor Beta Beta		Belleville, Ontario, Canada	ON	Active	
XP 1503	Preceptor Delta Xi		Gatesville, Texas	TX	Active	
XP 1504	Preceptor Alpha Chi		Valley Center, Kansas	KS	Active	
XP 1506	Preceptor Tau		Kingston, New York	NY	Active	
XP 1516	Preceptor Alpha Sigma		Beaverton, Oregon	OR	Active	
XP 1518	Preceptor Beta Pi		Northglenn, Colorado	CO	Active	
XP 1521	Preceptor Theta		North Battleford, Saskatchewan, Canada	SK	Active	
XP 1524	Preceptor Alpha Tau		Bend, Oregon	OR	Active	
XP 1525	Preceptor Alpha Psi		Topeka, Kansas	KS	Active	
XP 1528	Preceptor Alpha Omega		Coffeyville, Kansas	KS	Active	
XP 1532	Preceptor Beta Pi		Brooksville, Florida	FL	Active	
XP 1559	Preceptor Alpha Delta		Maple Ridge, British Columbia, Canada	BC	Active	
XP 1566	Preceptor Alpha Mu		Angola, Indiana	IN	Active	
XP 1567	Preceptor Alpha Nu		Madison, Indiana	IN	Active	
XP 1569	Preceptor Phi		Salmon, Idaho	ID	Active	
XP 1576	Preceptor Beta Alpha		Longmont, Colorado	CO	Active	
XP 1577	Preceptor Beta Delta		Mission, Kansas	KS	Active	
XP 1580	Preceptor Beta Omicron		Rolla, Missouri	MO	Active	
XP 1583	Preceptor Alpha Epsilon		Vernon, British Columbia, Canada	BC	Active	
XP 1587	Preceptor Beta Pi		Marshall, Missouri	MO	Active	
XP 1589	Preceptor Epsilon Tau		Carthage, Texas	TX	Active	
XP 1591	Preceptor Alpha Lambda		Carroll, Iowa	IA	Active	
XP 1592	Preceptor Nu		Lyons, Georgia	GA	Active	
XP 1594	Preceptor Alpha Upsilon		Milwaukie, Oregon	OR	Active	
XP 1601	Preceptor Alpha Phi		Grants Pass, Oregon	OR	Active	
XP 1611	Preceptor Eta Mu		Sebastopol, California	CA	Active	
XP 1615	Preceptor Beta Epsilon		Burlington, Ontario, Canada	ON	Active	
XP 1621	Preceptor Beta Sigma		Sikeston, Missouri	MO	Active	
XP 1626	Preceptor Omicron		Salem, New Jersey	NJ	Active	
XP 1630	Preceptor Eta Omicron		Sacramento, California	CA	Active	
XP 1636	Preceptor Chi		Pineville, West Virginia	WV	Active	
XP 1637	Preceptor Pi		Haddonfield, New Jersey	NJ	Active	
XP 1641	Preceptor Alpha Upsilon		Tamaqua, Pennsylvania	PA	Active	
XP 1646	Preceptor Alpha Zeta		Duncan, British Columbia, Canada	BC	Active	
XP 1647	Preceptor Beta Zeta		Manhattan, Kansas	KS	Active	
XP 1648	Preceptor Lambda		Buffalo, Wyoming	WY	Active	
XP 1661	Preceptor Beta Phi		Northbrook, Illinois	IL	Active	
XP 1662	Preceptor Epsilon		Ogden, Utah	UT	Active	
XP 1671	Preceptor Beta Eta		Wichita, Kansas	KS	Active	
XP 1673	Preceptor Beta Lambda		Othello, Washington	WA	Active	
XP 1674	Preceptor Beta Zeta		Carbondale, Colorado	CO	Active	
XP 1681	Preceptor Epsilon Delta		Midland, Texas	TX	Active	
XP 1683	Preceptor Xi		Clarksville, Tennessee	TN	Active	
XP 1691	Preceptor Beta Theta		Littleton, Colorado	CO	Active	
XP 1694	Preceptor Alpha Omega		Shippensburg, Pennsylvania	PA	Active	
XP 1703	Preceptor Alpha Theta		Kelowna, British Columbia, Canada	BC	Active	
XP 1706	Preceptor Eta Psi		San Diego, California	CA	Active	
XP 1707	Preceptor Delta		Milford, Delaware	DE	Active	
XP 1710	Preceptor Mu		Lexington, Kentucky	KY	Active	
XP 1712	Preceptor Psi		Enid, Oklahoma	OK	Active	
XP 1714	Preceptor Alpha Omicron		Plainfield, Indiana	IN	Active	
XP 1715	Preceptor Alpha Pi		Princeton, Indiana	IN	Active	
XP 1732	Preceptor Zeta		Truro, Nova Scotia, Canada	NS	Active	
XP 1733	Preceptor Iota		Fitchburg, Massachusetts	MA	Active	
XP 1734	Preceptor Mu		Gillette, Wyoming	WY	Active	
XP 1749	Preceptor Tau		Syracuse, Nebraska	NE	Active	
XP 1761	Preceptor Theta Iota		Santa Cruz, California	CA	Active	
XP 1762	Preceptor Alpha Beta		Oklahoma City, Oklahoma	OK	Active	
XP 1768	Preceptor Beta Theta		Exeter, Ontario, Canada	ON	Active	
XP 1783	Preceptor Upsilon		Omaha, Nebraska	NE	Active	
XP 1784	Preceptor Beta Kappa		Aurora, Ontario, Canada	ON	Active	
XP 1787	Preceptor Alpha Zeta		Stafford, Virginia	VA	Active	
XP 1788	Preceptor Beta Lambda		Garden City, Kansas	KS	Active	
XP 1789	Preceptor Pi		Baton Rouge, Louisiana	LA	Active	
XP 1790	Preceptor Theta Lambda		Red Bluff, California	CA	Active	
XP 1792	Preceptor Beta Epsilon		Kane, Pennsylvania	PA	Active	
XP 1795	Preceptor Beta Psi		Fredericktown, Missouri	MO	Active	
XP 1801	Preceptor Iota		Rosetown, Saskatchewan, Canada	SK	Active	
XP 1813	Preceptor Beta Xi		Oakville, Ontario, Canada	ON	Active	
XP 1819	Preceptor Alpha Alpha		Tempe, Arizona	AZ	Active	
XP 1827	Preceptor Alpha Kappa		North Vancouver, British Columbia, Canada	BC	Active	
XP 1833	Preceptor Epsilon		Jackson, Mississippi	MS	Active	
XP 1836	Preceptor Alpha Epsilon		Edmond, Oklahoma	OK	Active	
XP 1841	Preceptor Theta Xi		San Ramon, California	CA	Active	
XP 1845	Preceptor Beta Omega		Eldorado, Illinois	IL	Active	
XP 1862	Preceptor Beta Kappa		Rifle, Colorado	CO	Active	
XP 1865	Preceptor Gamma Epsilon		DeKalb, Illinois	IL	Active	
XP 1871	Preceptor Gamma Eta		Cocoa, Florida	FL	Active	
XP 1873	Preceptor Epsilon Phi		Brownwood, Texas	TX	Active	
XP 1885	Preceptor Alpha Chi		Kendallville, Indiana	IN	Active	
XP 1887	Preceptor Epsilon Omega		Austin, Texas	TX	Active	
XP 1891	Preceptor Alpha Nu		Coquitlam, British Columbia, Canada	BC	Active	
XP 1892	Preceptor Nu		Glendive, Montana	MT	Active	
XP 1894	Preceptor Beta Xi		Wichita, Kansas	KS	Active	
XP 1919	Preceptor Beta Rho		Kitchener, Ontario, Canada	ON	Active	
XP 1924	Preceptor Zeta Delta		Rio Grande City, Texas	TX	Active	
XP 1926	Preceptor Theta		Winnipeg, Manitoba, Canada	MB	Active	
XP 1954	Preceptor Zeta Zeta		Liberty, Texas	TX	Active	
XP 1956	Preceptor Beta Xi		Brush, Colorado	CO	Active	
XP 1963	Preceptor Alpha Epsilon		Tucson, Arizona	AZ	Active	
XP 1966	Preceptor Beta Alpha		Portland, Oregon	OR	Active	
XP 1976	Preceptor Phi		Shreveport, Louisiana	LA	Active	
XP 1977	Preceptor Alpha Omicron		Langley, British Columbia, Canada	BC	Active	
XP 1987	Preceptor Beta Beta		Storm Lake, Iowa	IA	Active	
XP 1992	Preceptor Gamma Zeta		Creve Coeur, Missouri	MO	Active	
XP 1994	Preceptor Gamma Nu		Mount Vernon, Illinois	IL	Active	
XP 1997	Preceptor Rho		Little Rock, Arkansas	AR	Active	
XP 2008	Preceptor Zeta Rho		Muleshoe, Texas	TX	Active	
XP 2015	Preceptor Gamma Eta		Lima, Ohio	OH	Active	
XP 2023	Preceptor Upsilon		Elberton, Georgia	GA	Active	
XP 2026	Preceptor Beta Upsilon		Lindsay, Ontario, Canada	ON	Active	
XP 2027	Preceptor Alpha Gamma		Nampa, Idaho	ID	Active	
XP 2033	Preceptor Zeta Chi		Baytown, Texas	TX	Active	
XP 2034	Preceptor Beta Pi		Concordia, Kansas	KS	Active	
XP 2036	Preceptor Beta Rho		Parsons, Kansas	KS	Active	
XP 2039	Preceptor Delta		Honolulu, Hawaii	HI	Active	
XP 2041	Preceptor Alpha Iota		Stillwater, Oklahoma	OK	Active	
XP 2047	Preceptor Gamma Theta		Richmond, Missouri	MO	Active	
XP 2048	Preceptor Beta Sigma		Kansas City, Kansas	KS	Active	
XP 2050	Preceptor Alpha Alpha		Columbus, Nebraska	NE	Active	
XP 2052	Preceptor Alpha Epsilon		Keyser, West Virginia	WV	Active	
XP 2055	Preceptor Gamma Tau		Jacksonville, Florida	FL	Active	
XP 2056	Preceptor Eta Alpha		Azle, Texas	TX	Active	
XP 2059	Preceptor Gamma Xi		Herrin, Illinois	IL	Active	
XP 2064	Preceptor Gamma Theta		Canton, Ohio	OH	Active	
XP 2069	Preceptor Phi		Goldsboro, North Carolina	NC	Active	
XP 2086	Preceptor Alpha Epsilon		Idaho Falls, Idaho	ID	Active	
XP 2092	Preceptor Beta Tau		Scott City, Kansas	KS	Active	
XP 2100	Preceptor Alpha Gamma		Chappell, Nebraska	NE	Active	
XP 2103	Preceptor Psi		Salisbury, North Carolina	NC	Active	
XP 2105	Preceptor Pi		Sturgis, South Dakota	SD	Active	
XP 2110	Preceptor Gamma Pi		Chicago, Illinois	IL	Active	
XP 2114	Preceptor Mu		Florence, South Carolina	SC	Active	
XP 2118	Preceptor Iota		Devils Lake, North Dakota	ND	Active	
XP 2124	Preceptor Iota Lambda		Turlock, California	CA	Active	
XP 2125	Preceptor Beta Beta		Mount Pleasant, Michigan	MI	Active	
XP 2130	Preceptor Eta Eta		Waco, Texas	TX	Active	
XP 2136	Preceptor Beta Phi		Vancouver, Washington	WA	Active	
XP 2146	Preceptor Beta Delta		Niles, Michigan	MI	Active	
XP 2149	Preceptor Alpha Tau		Prince Rupert, British Columbia, Canada	BC	Active	
XP 2150	Preceptor Beta Psi		London, Ontario, Canada	ON	Active	
XP 2161	Preceptor Pi		Fort Saskatchewan, Alberta, Canada	AB	Active	
XP 2163	Preceptor Phi		Madison, Wisconsin	WI	Active	
XP 2165	Preceptor Beta Omega		Simcoe, Ontario, Canada	ON	Active	
XP 2167	Preceptor Alpha Beta		New Orleans, Louisiana	LA	Active	
XP 2171	Preceptor Alpha Kappa		Phoenix, Arizona	AZ	Active	
XP 2175	Preceptor Gamma Rho		Harrisonville, Missouri	MO	Active	
XP 2177	Preceptor Pi		Douglas, Wyoming	WY	Active	
XP 2180	Preceptor Eta Kappa		Baytown, Texas	TX	Active	
XP 2190	Preceptor Chi		LaGrange, Georgia	GA	Active	
XP 2197	Preceptor Alpha Mu		Eloy, Arizona	AZ	Active	
XP 2200	Preceptor Gamma Beta		Cambridge, Ontario, Canada	ON	Active	
XP 2201	Preceptor Eta Nu		Richardson, Texas	TX	Active	
XP 2203	Preceptor Rho		Worland, Wyoming	WY	Active	
XP 2204	Preceptor Gamma Gamma		Cobourg, Ontario, Canada	ON	Active	
XP 2212	Preceptor Gamma Epsilon		St. Catharines, Ontario, Canada	ON	Active	
XP 2221	Preceptor Beta Upsilon		Franklin, Pennsylvania	PA	Active	
XP 2225	Preceptor Beta Chi		Oswego, Kansas	KS	Active	
XP 2231	Preceptor Iota Upsilon		Sacramento, California	CA	Active	
XP 2245	Preceptor Phi		Franklin, Tennessee	TN	Active	
XP 2246	Preceptor Eta Pi		Fredericksburg, Texas	TX	Active	
XP 2254	Preceptor Alpha Xi		Virginia Beach, Virginia	VA	Active	
XP 2257	Preceptor Beta Psi		Connell, Washington	WA	Active	
XP 2263	Preceptor Alpha Pi		Sand Springs, Oklahoma	OK	Active	
XP 2268	Preceptor Pi		Vernal, Utah	UT	Active	
XP 2270	Preceptor Delta Delta		Sanford, Florida	FL	Active	
XP 2277	Preceptor Alpha Delta		Lexington, North Carolina	NC	Active	
XP 2282	Preceptor Sigma		Newcastle, Wyoming	WY	Active	
XP 2289	Preceptor Gamma Psi		Paris, Illinois	IL	Active	
XP 2301	Preceptor Eta Phi		Sweetwater, Texas	TX	Active	
XP 2302	Preceptor Beta Omega		Quincy, Washington	WA	Active	
XP 2313	Preceptor Alpha Psi		Delta, British Columbia, Canada	BC	Active	
XP 2315	Preceptor Gamma Omega		Fremont, Ohio	OH	Active	
XP 2321	Preceptor Eta Psi		Arlington, Texas	TX	Active	
XP 2327	Preceptor Alpha Omega		Sidney, British Columbia, Canada	BC	Active	
XP 2328	Preceptor Beta Alpha		Fort St. John, British Columbia, Canada	BC	Active	
XP 2332	Preceptor Delta Iota		Brooksville, Florida	FL	Active	
XP 2347	Preceptor Chi		Baraboo, Wisconsin	WI	Active	
XP 2365	Preceptor Alpha Zeta		Elmira, New York	NY	Active	
XP 2369	Preceptor Alpha Gamma		White Pine, Tennessee	TN	Active	
XP 2390	Preceptor Gamma Iota		Ottawa, Ontario, Canada	ON	Active	
XP 2392	Preceptor Delta Mu		Titusville, Florida	FL	Active	
XP 2398	Preceptor Kappa Lambda		Pacifica, California	CA	Active	
XP 2399	Preceptor Alpha Zeta		McCall, Idaho	ID	Active	
XP 2403	Preceptor Gamma Kappa		Burlington, Ontario, Canada	ON	Active	
XP 2413	Preceptor Psi		Little Rock, Arkansas	AR	Active	
XP 2416	Preceptor Tau		Sheridan, Wyoming	WY	Active	
XP 2420	Preceptor Sigma		Nanton, Alberta, Canada	AB	Active	
XP 2426	Preceptor Lambda		Devils Lake, North Dakota	ND	Active	
XP 2435	Preceptor Alpha Omicron		Farmington, New Mexico	NM	Active	
XP 2443	Preceptor Delta Tau		Bradenton, Florida	FL	Active	
XP 2445	Preceptor Delta Upsilon		Daytona Beach, Florida	FL	Active	
XP 2447	Preceptor Alpha Upsilon		Lake Havasu City, Arizona	AZ	Active	
XP 2450	Preceptor Theta Xi		Wichita Falls, Texas	TX	Active	
XP 2460	Preceptor Pi		Coon Rapids, Minnesota	MN	Active	
XP 2467	Preceptor Gamma Chi		Liberty, Missouri	MO	Active	
XP 2472	Preceptor Alpha Kappa		Martinsburg, West Virginia	WV	Active	
XP 2479	Preceptor Gamma Beta		Port Angeles, Washington	WA	Active	
XP 2488	Preceptor Psi		Hackettstown, New Jersey	NJ	Active	
XP 2506	Preceptor Alpha Beta		Mena, Arkansas	AR	Active	
XP 2510	Preceptor Delta Iota		West Frankfort, Illinois	IL	Active	
XP 2516	Preceptor Mu		Eagle River, Anchorage, Alaska	AK	Active	
XP 2519	Preceptor Kappa Phi		Hemet, California	CA	Active	
XP 2522	Preceptor Kappa Psi		Sebastopol, California	CA	Active	
XP 2523	Preceptor Kappa Omega		Riverside, California	CA	Active	
XP 2540	Preceptor Gamma Eta		South Bend, Washington	WA	Active	
XP 2547	Preceptor Gamma Nu		Guelph, Ontario, Canada	ON	Active	
XP 2551	Preceptor Alpha Zeta		Knoxville, Tennessee	TN	Active	
XP 2557	Preceptor Alpha Theta		Crete, Nebraska	NE	Active	
XP 2558	Preceptor Alpha Gamma		Horseshoe Bend, Arkansas	AR	Active	
XP 2559	Preceptor Beta Sigma		Tillamook, Oregon	OR	Active	
XP 2561	Preceptor Sigma		Enterprise, Alabama	AL	Active	
XP 2566	Preceptor Beta Upsilon		Bayfield, Colorado	CO	Active	
XP 2568	Preceptor Gamma Xi		Port Perry, Ontario, Canada	ON	Active	
XP 2571	Preceptor Beta Chi		Webster City, Iowa	IA	Active	
XP 2572	Preceptor Gamma Omicron		Thunder Bay, Ontario, Canada	ON	Active	
XP 2573	Preceptor Omicron		Las Vegas, Nevada	NV	Active	
XP 2577	Preceptor Beta Kappa		Victoria, British Columbia, Canada	BC	Active	
XP 2584	Preceptor Alpha Lambda		Lewisburg, West Virginia	WV	Active	
XP 2588	Preceptor Tau		Billings, Montana	MT	Active	
XP 2589	Preceptor Epsilon Gamma		Clearwater, Florida	FL	Active	
XP 2593	Preceptor Delta Gamma		Independence, Missouri	MO	Active	
XP 2596	Preceptor Beta Phi		Englewood, Colorado	CO	Active	
XP 2601	Preceptor Alpha Iota		Cody, Nebraska	NE	Active	
XP 2605	Preceptor Gamma Theta		Arlington, Washington	WA	Active	
XP 2606	Preceptor Gamma Iota		Marysville, Washington	WA	Active	
XP 2609	Preceptor Tau		Bowling Green, Kentucky	KY	Active	
XP 2610	Preceptor Iota Eta		Ennis, Texas	TX	Active	
XP 2616	Preceptor Gamma Alpha		Mount Pleasant, Iowa	IA	Active	
XP 2618	Preceptor Alpha Iota		American Falls, Idaho	ID	Active	
XP 2623	Preceptor Alpha Omega		Norton, Virginia	VA	Active	
XP 2626	Preceptor Omega		West Monroe, Louisiana	LA	Active	
XP 2629	Preceptor Alpha Iota		Weaverville, North Carolina	NC	Active	
XP 2631	Preceptor Alpha Kappa		Asheville, North Carolina	NC	Active	
XP 2641	Preceptor Delta Epsilon		Gower, Missouri	MO	Active	
XP 2664	Preceptor Alpha Chi		Falmouth, Virginia	VA	Active	
XP 2665	Preceptor Alpha Kappa		Twin Falls, Idaho	ID	Active	
XP 2667	Preceptor Delta		Hampton, New Brunswick, Canada	NB	Active	
XP 2671	Preceptor Alpha Pi		Alamogordo, New Mexico	NM	Active	
XP 2674	Preceptor Iota		Boissevain, Manitoba, Canada	MB	Active	
XP 2676	Preceptor Delta Tau		Radnor, Ohio	OH	Active	
XP 2679	Preceptor Tau		Limestone, Maine	ME	Active	
XP 2683	Preceptor Lambda Mu		China Lake, California	CA	Active	
XP 2690	Preceptor Phi		Joppa, Maryland	MD	Active	
XP 2693	Preceptor Beta Omicron		Indianapolis, Indiana	IN	Active	
XP 2694	Preceptor Beta Pi		Muncie, Indiana	IN	Active	
XP 2696	Preceptor Chi		Rawlins, Wyoming	WY	Active	
XP 2698	Preceptor Delta Pi		Herrin, Illinois	IL	Active	
XP 2701	Preceptor Iota Mu		Nacogdoches, Texas	TX	Active	
XP 2710	Preceptor Beta Mu		Kamloops, British Columbia, Canada	BC	Active	
XP 2720	Preceptor Delta Eta		Versailles, Missouri	MO	Active	
XP 2723	Preceptor Alpha Gamma		Cumming, Georgia	GA	Active	
XP 2729	Preceptor Xi		Lloydminster, Saskatchewan, Canada	SK	Active	
XP 2736	Preceptor Delta Sigma		Moline, Illinois	IL	Active	
XP 2770	Preceptor Gamma Eta		New Hampton, Iowa	IA	Active	
XP 2774	Preceptor Beta Gamma		Yorktown, Virginia	VA	Active	
XP 2782	Preceptor Alpha Epsilon		Metter, Georgia	GA	Active	
XP 2797	Preceptor Alpha Beta		Merrill, Wisconsin	WI	Active	
XP 2799	Preceptor Gamma Lambda		Farmington, Washington	WA	Active	
XP 2807	Preceptor Alpha Omega		Litchfield Park, Arizona	AZ	Active	
XP 2808	Preceptor Beta Alpha		Lake Havasu City, Arizona	AZ	Active	
XP 2813	Preceptor Kappa Alpha		Elkhart, Texas	TX	Active	
XP 2814	Preceptor Beta Rho		Salem, Indiana	IN	Active	
XP 2817	Preceptor Kappa Beta		San Marcos, Texas	TX	Active	
XP 2818	Preceptor Beta Sigma		Nineveh, Indiana	IN	Active	
XP 2820	Preceptor Delta Lambda		Chillicothe, Missouri	MO	Active	
XP 2829	Preceptor Delta Mu		Farmington, Missouri	MO	Active	
XP 2835	Preceptor Kappa Gamma		Tyler, Texas	TX	Active	
XP 2836	Preceptor Alpha Gamma		Cape May, New Jersey	NJ	Active	
XP 2840	Preceptor Kappa Delta		Eldorado, Texas	TX	Active	
XP 2842	Preceptor Gamma Phi		Sioux Lookout, Ontario, Canada	ON	Active	
XP 2850	Preceptor Gamma Nu		Shelton, Washington	WA	Active	
XP 2862	Preceptor Phi		Red Deer, Alberta, Canada	AB	Active	
XP 2863	Preceptor Delta Nu		Richmond, Missouri	MO	Active	
XP 2872	Preceptor Gamma Gamma		Herington, Kansas	KS	Active	
XP 2878	Preceptor Gamma Omicron		Norristown, Pennsylvania	PA	Active	
XP 2881	Preceptor Mu Epsilon		San Luis Obispo, California	CA	Active	
XP 2892	Preceptor Gamma Lambda		Fort Madison, Iowa	IA	Active	
XP 2894	Preceptor Beta Tau		Fernie, British Columbia, Canada	BC	Active	
XP 2895	Preceptor Alpha Nu		Norfolk, Nebraska	NE	Active	
XP 2901	Preceptor Mu Theta		Cloverdale, California	CA	Active	
XP 2904	Preceptor Alpha		Ramsen, Rhineland-Palatinate, Germany	Rhineland-Palatinate	Active	
XP 2906	Preceptor Gamma Rho		Olympia, Washington	WA	Active	
XP 2912	Preceptor Gamma Psi		Richmond, Ontario, Canada	ON	Active	
XP 2915	Preceptor Beta Gamma		Scottsdale, Arizona	AZ	Active	
XP 2919	Preceptor Alpha Kappa		San Antonio, Texas	TX	Active	
XP 2928	Preceptor Omicron		Saskatoon, Saskatchewan, Canada	SK	Active	
XP 2929	Preceptor Alpha Gamma		Madison, Wisconsin	WI	Active	
XP 2934	Preceptor Alpha Beta		Rapid City, South Dakota	SD	Active	
XP 2935	Preceptor Kappa Nu		San Antonio, Texas	TX	Active	
XP 2940	Preceptor Gamma Delta		Junction City, Kansas	KS	Active	
XP 2942	Preceptor Alpha		Whitehorse, Yukon, Canada	YT	Active	
XP 2947	Preceptor Beta Eta		Alva, Oklahoma	OK	Active	
XP 2949	Preceptor Eta		Hanover, New Hampshire	NH	Active	
XP 2959	Preceptor Alpha Rho		Columbus, Nebraska	NE	Active	
XP 2960	Preceptor Chi		Medicine Hat, Alberta, Canada	AB	Active	
XP 2964	Preceptor Beta Delta		Show Low, Arizona	AZ	Active	
XP 2966	Preceptor Alpha		Tlalpan, Mexico City, Mexico	Distrito Federal	Active	
XP 2968	Preceptor Epsilon Iota		Warren, Ohio	OH	Active	
XP 2969	Preceptor Alpha Sigma		Omaha, Nebraska	NE	Active	
XP 2972	Preceptor Zeta Beta		Orlando, Florida	FL	Active	
XP 2975	Preceptor Delta Sigma		Waverly, Missouri	MO	Active	
XP 2983	Preceptor Epsilon Kappa		Piqua, Ohio	OH	Active	
XP 2992	Preceptor Epsilon Lambda		Wellington, Ohio	OH	Active	
XP 2993	Preceptor Gamma Pi		Warfordsburg, Pennsylvania	PA	Active	
XP 2999	Preceptor Alpha		Athens, Attica, Greece	Attica	Active	
XP 3009	Preceptor Gamma Zeta		Russell, Kansas	KS	Active	
XP 3016	Preceptor Alpha Nu		Charleston, West Virginia	WV	Active	
XP 3024	Preceptor Lambda Delta		Kilgore, Texas	TX	Active	
XP 3025	Preceptor Gamma Eta		Sterling, Kansas	KS	Active	
XP 3027	Preceptor Alpha Nu		Germantown, Tennessee	TN	Active	
XP 3031	Preceptor Delta Gamma		Brampton, Ontario, Canada	ON	Active	
XP 3032	Preceptor Delta Delta		Etobicoke, Ontario, Canada	ON	Active	
XP 3033	Preceptor Lambda Epsilon		West Columbia, Texas	TX	Active	
XP 3043	Preceptor Delta Psi		Lancaster, Missouri	MO	Active	
XP 3044	Preceptor Beta Chi		Connersville, Indiana	IN	Active	
XP 3045	Preceptor Lambda Eta		Fort Worth, Texas	TX	Active	
XP 3056	Preceptor Gamma Omicron		Le Mars, Iowa	IA	Active	
XP 3060	Preceptor Epsilon Xi		Athens, Ohio	OH	Active	
XP 3062	Preceptor Gamma Pi		Des Moines, Iowa	IA	Active	
XP 3065	Preceptor Nu		Grand Forks, North Dakota	ND	Active	
XP 3072	Preceptor Gamma Alpha		Eugene, Oregon	OR	Active	
XP 3073	Preceptor Gamma Beta		Fort Collins, Colorado	CO	Active	
XP 3080	Preceptor Lambda Lambda		San Angelo, Texas	TX	Active	
XP 3104	Preceptor Epsilon Rho		Elyria, Ohio	OH	Active	
XP 3107	Preceptor Psi		Laurel, Maryland	MD	Active	
XP 3112	Preceptor Alpha Tau		Canton, New York	NY	Active	
XP 3113	Preceptor Omega		Huntsville, Alabama	AL	Active	
XP 3117	Preceptor Gamma Iota		Sabetha, Kansas	KS	Active	
XP 3123	Preceptor Alpha Upsilon		Jamestown, New York	NY	Active	
XP 3130	Preceptor Phi		Red Lodge, Montana	MT	Active	
XP 3143	Preceptor Mu Phi		Auburn, California	CA	Active	
XP 3152	Preceptor Upsilon		Tonopah, Nevada	NV	Active	
XP 3153	Preceptor Gamma Zeta		Delta, British Columbia, Canada	BC	Active	
XP 3156	Preceptor Lambda Upsilon		Athens, Texas	TX	Active	
XP 3160	Preceptor Alpha Alpha		Torrington, Wyoming	WY	Active	
XP 3176	Preceptor Alpha Omicron		Pierce, Idaho	ID	Active	
XP 3183	Preceptor Epsilon Eta		Festus, Missouri	MO	Active	
XP 3191	Preceptor Alpha Pi		Manchester, Tennessee	TN	Active	
XP 3192	Preceptor Lambda Psi		Corpus Christi, Texas	TX	Active	
XP 3197	Preceptor Epsilon Iota		Memphis, Missouri	MO	Active	
XP 3202	Preceptor Lambda Omega		Lufkin, Texas	TX	Active	
XP 3203	Preceptor Epsilon Theta		Platte City, Missouri	MO	Active	
XP 3204	Preceptor Epsilon Kappa		Jefferson City, Missouri	MO	Active	
XP 3212	Preceptor Alpha Kappa		Ozark, Arkansas	AR	Active	
XP 3224	Preceptor Alpha Nu		Dublin, Georgia	GA	Active	
XP 3226	Preceptor Beta Omicron		Poteau, Oklahoma	OK	Active	
XP 3236	Preceptor Eta Beta		Gainesville, Florida	FL	Active	
XP 3249	Preceptor Epsilon Nu		Nokomis, Illinois	IL	Active	
XP 3255	Preceptor Mu Iota		Katy, Texas	TX	Active	
XP 3262	Preceptor Gamma Eta		Surrey, British Columbia, Canada	BC	Active	
XP 3265	Preceptor Mu Xi		Texarkana, Texas	TX	Active	
XP 3271	Preceptor Epsilon Pi		Pontiac, Illinois	IL	Active	
XP 3277	Preceptor Alpha Epsilon		Rapid City, South Dakota	SD	Active	
XP 3278	Preceptor Beta Upsilon		Hobart, Oklahoma	OK	Active	
XP 3279	Preceptor Alpha Iota		Rayne, Louisiana	LA	Active	
XP 3280	Preceptor Alpha Omicron		Union, West Virginia	WV	Active	
XP 3282	Preceptor Epsilon Phi		Columbus, Ohio	OH	Active	
XP 3291	Preceptor Alpha Tau		Nashville, Tennessee	TN	Active	
XP 3294	Preceptor Alpha Pi		Parkersburg, West Virginia	WV	Active	
XP 3308	Preceptor Gamma Theta		Richmond, British Columbia, Canada	BC	Active	
XP 3311	Preceptor Delta Iota		Sault Ste. Marie, Ontario, Canada	ON	Active	
XP 3312	Preceptor Epsilon Omega		Chillicothe, Ohio	OH	Active	
XP 3326	Preceptor Nu Delta		Grass Valley, California	CA	Active	
XP 3327	Preceptor Gamma Iota		New Westminster, British Columbia, Canada	BC	Active	
XP 3336	Preceptor Alpha		Jackson, Michigan	MI	Active	
XP 3338	Preceptor Lambda		Killarney, Manitoba, Canada	MB	Active	
XP 3349	Preceptor Epsilon Sigma		Aurora, Illinois	IL	Active	
XP 3356	Preceptor Alpha Omega		Paris, Tennessee	TN	Active	
XP 3364	Preceptor Beta Alpha		Gastonia, North Carolina	NC	Active	
XP 3366	Preceptor Chi		Murrells Inlet, South Carolina	SC	Active	
XP 3367	Preceptor Gamma Eta		Northglenn, Colorado	CO	Active	
XP 3370	Preceptor Alpha Kappa		Metairie, Louisiana	LA	Active	
XP 3371	Preceptor Gamma Theta		Aurora, Colorado	CO	Active	
XP 3374	Preceptor Epsilon Phi		Pleasant Hill, Missouri	MO	Active	
XP 3384	Preceptor Beta Kappa		Sierra Vista, Arizona	AZ	Active	
XP 3385	Preceptor Epsilon Psi		Creve Coeur, Missouri	MO	Active	
XP 3392	Preceptor Beta Omega		Blackwell, Oklahoma	OK	Active	
XP 3393	Preceptor Nu Alpha		San Antonio, Texas	TX	Active	
XP 3394	Preceptor Epsilon Omega		Joplin, Missouri	MO	Active	
XP 3397	Preceptor Xi		Springerville, Arizona	AZ	Active	
XP 3400	Preceptor Gamma Xi		Gardner, Kansas	KS	Active	
XP 3412	Preceptor Epsilon Chi		Pekin, Illinois	IL	Active	
XP 3418	Preceptor Gamma Alpha		Morris, Oklahoma	OK	Active	
XP 3421	Preceptor Delta Lambda		Port Hope, Ontario, Canada	ON	Active	
XP 3424	Preceptor Zeta Beta		Shelbina, Missouri	MO	Active	
XP 3429	Preceptor Delta Mu		Timmins, Ontario, Canada	ON	Active	
XP 3430	Preceptor Zeta Delta		Bosworth, Missouri	MO	Active	
XP 3431	Preceptor Nu Xi		Anderson, California	CA	Active	
XP 3433	Preceptor Zeta Delta		Medina, Ohio	OH	Active	
XP 3434	Preceptor Gamma Tau		Washington, Iowa	IA	Active	
XP 3436	Preceptor Gamma Iota		Colorado Springs, Colorado	CO	Active	
XP 3443	Preceptor Zeta		Conception Bay South, Newfoundland and Labrador, Canada	NL	Active	
XP 3444	Preceptor Alpha Chi		Harvard, Nebraska	NE	Active	
XP 3449	Preceptor Gamma Omicron		Liberal, Kansas	KS	Active	
XP 3453	Preceptor Gamma Lambda		Nanaimo, British Columbia, Canada	BC	Active	
XP 3456	Preceptor Nu Rho		San Luis Obispo, California	CA	Active	
XP 3460	Preceptor Gamma Kappa		Montrose, Colorado	CO	Active	
XP 3463	Preceptor Beta Alpha		Lafayette, Tennessee	TN	Active	
XP 3469	Preceptor Delta Omicron		Alliston, Ontario, Canada	ON	Active	
XP 3473	Preceptor Gamma Chi		Council Bluffs, Iowa	IA	Active	
XP 3474	Preceptor Lambda		Peabody, Massachusetts	MA	Active	
XP 3486	Preceptor Gamma Mu		Troy, Michigan	MI	Active	
XP 3487	Preceptor Omega		Beaufort, South Carolina	SC	Active	
XP 3490	Preceptor Gamma Nu		Fenton, Michigan	MI	Active	
XP 3491	Preceptor Nu Upsilon		Hayward, California	CA	Active	
XP 3494	Preceptor Nu Phi		Linden, California	CA	Active	
XP 3510	Preceptor Gamma Mu		Lakewood, Colorado	CO	Active	
XP 3512	Preceptor Phi		Las Vegas, Nevada	NV	Active	
XP 3515	Preceptor Gamma Tau		Ellsworth, Kansas	KS	Active	
XP 3521	Preceptor Zeta Theta		Hamilton, Missouri	MO	Active	
XP 3524	Preceptor Delta Tau		Oakville, Ontario, Canada	ON	Active	
XP 3530	Preceptor Gamma Iota		Fort Wayne, Indiana	IN	Active	
XP 3533	Preceptor Gamma Omega		Osage, Iowa	IA	Active	
XP 3536	Preceptor Psi		Baker, Montana	MT	Active	
XP 3538	Preceptor Beta Delta		Sayville, New York	NY	Active	
XP 3544	Preceptor Zeta Epsilon		Jacksonville, Illinois	IL	Active	
XP 3546	Preceptor Nu Psi		Santa Clarita, California	CA	Active	
XP 3555	Preceptor Psi		Bar Harbor, Maine	ME	Active	
XP 3557	Preceptor Nu Theta		Stanton, Texas	TX	Active	
XP 3566	Preceptor Gamma Kappa		Jasper, Indiana	IN	Active	
XP 3568	Preceptor Gamma Xi		Aurora, Colorado	CO	Active	
XP 3571	Preceptor Beta Epsilon		Brocton, New York	NY	Active	
XP 3572	Preceptor Alpha Gamma		Huntsville, Alabama	AL	Active	
XP 3574	Preceptor Gamma Eta		Corvallis, Oregon	OR	Active	
XP 3577	Preceptor Gamma Mu		Crawfordsville, Indiana	IN	Active	
XP 3578	Preceptor Xi Beta		Fresno, California	CA	Active	
XP 3590	Preceptor Omicron		Watford City, North Dakota	ND	Active	
XP 3592	Preceptor Alpha Delta		Enterprise, Alabama	AL	Active	
XP 3601	Preceptor Alpha Theta		Linden, New Jersey	NJ	Active	
XP 3602	Preceptor Beta Zeta		Greensboro, North Carolina	NC	Active	
XP 3605	Preceptor Alpha Pi		Boise, Idaho	ID	Active	
XP 3608	Preceptor Mu		Winnipeg, Manitoba, Canada	MB	Active	
XP 3614	Preceptor Xi Epsilon		San Diego, California	CA	Active	
XP 3616	Preceptor Gamma Omicron		Muskegon, Michigan	MI	Active	
XP 3618	Preceptor Delta Alpha		Tacoma, Washington	WA	Active	
XP 3626	Preceptor Chi		Sparks, Nevada	NV	Active	
XP 3629	Preceptor Gamma Omicron		Durango, Colorado	CO	Active	
XP 3631	Preceptor Beta Theta		New Bern, North Carolina	NC	Active	
XP 3641	Preceptor Beta Beta		Athens, Tennessee	TN	Active	
XP 3649	Preceptor Gamma Psi		Fort Scott, Kansas	KS	Active	
XP 3655	Preceptor Delta Omega		London, Ontario, Canada	ON	Active	
XP 3656	Preceptor Epsilon Alpha		Kincardine, Ontario, Canada	ON	Active	
XP 3661	Preceptor Alpha Zeta		Rapid City, South Dakota	SD	Active	
XP 3664	Preceptor Zeta Eta		Pekin, Illinois	IL	Active	
XP 3665	Preceptor Beta Omega		Colonial Heights, Virginia	VA	Active	
XP 3670	Preceptor Gamma Omicron		Sheridan, Indiana	IN	Active	
XP 3673	Preceptor Nu Tau		Overton, Texas	TX	Active	
XP 3675	Preceptor Nu Phi		Midland, Texas	TX	Active	
XP 3679	Preceptor Alpha Omega		Blair, Nebraska	NE	Active	
XP 3682	Preceptor Delta Gamma		Huntingdon, Pennsylvania	PA	Active	
XP 3687	Preceptor Zeta Pi		Hannibal, Missouri	MO	Active	
XP 3691	Preceptor Omicron Beta		McAllen, Texas	TX	Active	
XP 3700	Preceptor Gamma Sigma		Niles, Michigan	MI	Active	
XP 3701	Preceptor Omega		Layton, Utah	UT	Active	
XP 3709	Preceptor Xi Alpha		Spring, Texas	TX	Active	
XP 3715	Preceptor Gamma Lambda		McMinnville, Oregon	OR	Active	
XP 3718	Preceptor Zeta Pi		Madison, Ohio	OH	Active	
XP 3722	Preceptor Gamma Mu		Salem, Oregon	OR	Active	
XP 3725	Preceptor Zeta Upsilon		Grandview, Missouri	MO	Active	
XP 3735	Preceptor Sigma		Melville, Saskatchewan, Canada	SK	Active	
XP 3748	Preceptor Alpha Delta		St. Albert, Alberta, Canada	AB	Active	
XP 3750	Preceptor Xi Kappa		Brea, California	CA	Active	
XP 3754	Preceptor Mu Tau		Galesburg, Illinois	IL	Active	
XP 3755	Preceptor Omicron Zeta		Amarillo, Texas	TX	Active	
XP 3760	Preceptor Alpha Sigma		Boise, Idaho	ID	Active	
XP 3761	Preceptor Gamma Tau		Washington, Indiana	IN	Active	
XP 3762	Preceptor Gamma Gamma		Colonial Heights, Virginia	VA	Active	
XP 3765	Preceptor Beta Xi		Fayetteville, North Carolina	NC	Active	
XP 3769	Preceptor Delta Delta		Mission, Kansas	KS	Active	
XP 3770	Preceptor Epsilon Eta		Ottawa, Ontario, Canada	ON	Active	
XP 3771	Preceptor Gamma Delta		Springfield, Virginia	VA	Active	
XP 3772	Preceptor Beta Alpha		Bellevue, Nebraska	NE	Active	
XP 3774	Preceptor Omicron Eta		Navasota, Texas	TX	Active	
XP 3775	Preceptor Beta Kappa		Sidney, New York	NY	Active	
XP 3777	Preceptor Xi Mu		Atascadero, California	CA	Active	
XP 3778	Preceptor Alpha Zeta		Annapolis, Maryland	MD	Active	
XP 3779	Preceptor Theta Omicron		Okeechobee, Florida	FL	Active	
XP 3781	Preceptor Xi Nu		Los Banos, California	CA	Active	
XP 3787	Preceptor Theta		Sutherland, New South Wales, Australia	NSW	Active	
XP 3792	Preceptor Theta Rho		Mount Dora, Florida	FL	Active	
XP 3795	Preceptor Kappa		Merrimack, New Hampshire	NH	Active	
XP 3810	Preceptor Gamma Delta		Elk City, Oklahoma	OK	Active	
XP 3812	Preceptor Epsilon Iota		Richmond Hill, Ontario, Canada	ON	Active	
XP 3815	Preceptor Gamma Rho		Greeley, Colorado	CO	Active	
XP 3818	Preceptor Theta Sigma		Sarasota, Florida	FL	Active	
XP 3820	Preceptor Omicron Theta		Electra, Texas	TX	Active	
XP 3822	Preceptor Epsilon Kappa		Kingston, Ontario, Canada	ON	Active	
XP 3825	Preceptor Alpha Phi		Toccoa, Georgia	GA	Active	
XP 3829	Preceptor Xi Beta		League City, Texas	TX	Active	
XP 3831	Preceptor Eta Delta		Sweet Springs, Missouri	MO	Active	
XP 3832	Preceptor Delta Epsilon		Sioux City, Iowa	IA	Active	
XP 3833	Preceptor Epsilon Lambda		Ajax, Ontario, Canada	ON	Active	
XP 3835	Preceptor Xi Gamma		Odessa, Texas	TX	Active	
XP 3836	Preceptor Zeta Sigma		Chillicothe, Ohio	OH	Active	
XP 3841	Preceptor Alpha Eta		Prattville, Alabama	AL	Active	
XP 3848	Preceptor Gamma Chi		South Bend, Indiana	IN	Active	
XP 3849	Preceptor Alpha Chi		Rayne, Louisiana	LA	Active	
XP 3851	Preceptor Zeta Xi		Dongola, Illinois	IL	Active	
XP 3852	Preceptor Alpha Theta		Alexander City, Alabama	AL	Active	
XP 3857	Preceptor Epsilon Nu		Kitchener, Ontario, Canada	ON	Active	
XP 3858	Preceptor Gamma Zeta		Chesapeake, Virginia	VA	Active	
XP 3862	Preceptor Pi		Soldotna, Alaska	AK	Active	
XP 3876	Preceptor Zeta Omicron		Aurora, Illinois	IL	Active	
XP 3879	Preceptor Eta Kappa		Kirksville, Missouri	MO	Active	
XP 3880	Preceptor Zeta Tau		Milan, Ohio	OH	Active	
XP 3891	Preceptor Delta Theta		Spirit Lake, Iowa	IA	Active	
XP 3898	Preceptor Xi Sigma		Irvine, California	CA	Active	
XP 3902	Preceptor Gamma Epsilon		Checotah, Oklahoma	OK	Active	
XP 3910	Preceptor Gamma Omicron		Silverton, Oregon	OR	Active	
XP 3913	Preceptor Delta Epsilon		Huntingdon, Pennsylvania	PA	Active	
XP 3914	Preceptor Upsilon		Moose Jaw, Saskatchewan, Canada	SK	Active	
XP 3919	Preceptor Xi Lambda		Sunray, Texas	TX	Active	
XP 3923	Preceptor Eta Nu		Neelyville, Missouri	MO	Active	
XP 3926	Preceptor Beta Delta		Los Lunas, New Mexico	NM	Active	
XP 3927	Preceptor Xi Mu		Denison, Texas	TX	Active	
XP 3928	Preceptor Alpha Omega		Woodstock, Georgia	GA	Active	
XP 3934	Preceptor Alpha Omega		Covington, Louisiana	LA	Active	
XP 3939	Preceptor Mu Upsilon		Royalton, Illinois	IL	Active	
XP 3942	Preceptor Xi Phi		Patterson, California	CA	Active	
XP 3943	Preceptor Alpha Kappa		Camden, New Jersey	NJ	Active	
XP 3947	Preceptor Gamma Zeta		Muskogee, Oklahoma	OK	Active	
XP 3951	Preceptor Alpha Gamma		Murray, Kentucky	KY	Active	
XP 3958	Preceptor Alpha Mu		Red Bank, New Jersey	NJ	Active	
XP 3967	Preceptor Delta Kappa		McPherson, Kansas	KS	Active	
XP 3968	Preceptor Xi Xi		Arlington, Texas	TX	Active	
XP 3970	Preceptor Gamma Nu		Portsmouth, Virginia	VA	Active	
XP 3976	Preceptor Delta Lambda		Hugoton, Kansas	KS	Active	
XP 3980	Preceptor Beta Alpha		Cataula, Georgia	GA	Active	
XP 3984	Preceptor Delta Xi		Salina, Kansas	KS	Active	
XP 3990	Preceptor Xi Rho		Irving, Texas	TX	Active	
XP 3993	Preceptor Alpha Theta		Yankton, South Dakota	SD	Active	
XP 3994	Preceptor Beta Epsilon		Powell, Tennessee	TN	Active	
XP 3995	Preceptor Omicron Delta		Antioch, California	CA	Active	
XP 4011	Preceptor Xi Sigma		Houston, Texas	TX	Active	
XP 4016	Preceptor Eta Sigma		Jefferson City, Missouri	MO	Active	
XP 4020	Preceptor Eta Tau		St. Joseph, Missouri	MO	Active	
XP 4026	Preceptor Xi Tau		San Antonio, Texas	TX	Active	
XP 4036	Preceptor Xi Upsilon		Hamshire, Texas	TX	Active	
XP 4042	Preceptor Alpha Nu		Hayward, California	CA	Active	
XP 4047	Preceptor Beta Chi		Tucson, Arizona	AZ	Active	
XP 4048	Preceptor Gamma Psi		Ann Arbor, Michigan	MI	Active	
XP 4050	Preceptor Delta Delta		Fort Wayne, Indiana	IN	Active	
XP 4055	Preceptor Iota Iota		Boynton Beach, Florida	FL	Active	
XP 4058	Preceptor Zeta Upsilon		Lena, Illinois	IL	Active	
XP 4061	Preceptor Alpha Beta		Elko, Nevada	NV	Active	
XP 4065	Preceptor Beta Delta		Woodstock, Georgia	GA	Active	
XP 4070	Preceptor Alpha Epsilon		Beaufort, South Carolina	SC	Active	
XP 4072	Preceptor Lambda Alpha		Laurie, Missouri	MO	Active	
XP 4078	Preceptor Beta Psi		Holbrook, Arizona	AZ	Active	
XP 4081	Preceptor Xi Omega		Roma, Texas	TX	Active	
XP 4086	Preceptor Beta Eta		Fort Smith, Arkansas	AR	Active	
XP 4088	Preceptor Epsilon Phi		Windsor, Ontario, Canada	ON	Active	
XP 4103	Preceptor Beta Delta		Clarksburg, West Virginia	WV	Active	
XP 4104	Preceptor Beta Epsilon		Lewisburg, West Virginia	WV	Active	
XP 4108	Preceptor Iota Mu		Port St. Lucie, Florida	FL	Active	
XP 4110	Preceptor Beta Sigma		Niagara Falls, New York	NY	Active	
XP 4111	Preceptor Lambda Epsilon		Jefferson City, Missouri	MO	Active	
XP 4114	Preceptor Beta Tau		Morehead City, North Carolina	NC	Active	
XP 4116	Preceptor Gamma Alpha		Scottsdale, Arizona	AZ	Active	
XP 4118	Preceptor Beta Epsilon		Lawrenceville, Georgia	GA	Active	
XP 4119	Preceptor Lambda Zeta		Buffalo, Missouri	MO	Active	
XP 4121	Preceptor Beta Gamma		Gonzales, Louisiana	LA	Active	
XP 4123	Preceptor Alpha Epsilon		Bowling Green, Kentucky	KY	Active	
XP 4124	Preceptor Omicron Zeta		Antelope, California	CA	Active	
XP 4127	Preceptor Lambda Eta		Mercer, Missouri	MO	Active	
XP 4130	Preceptor Delta Beta		Romeo, Michigan	MI	Active	
XP 4131	Preceptor Alpha Nu		Chestertown, Maryland	MD	Active	
XP 4135	Preceptor Beta Theta		Peachtree City, Georgia	GA	Active	
XP 4139	Preceptor Alpha Gamma		Lincoln, Maine	ME	Active	
XP 4147	Preceptor Lambda Iota		Jefferson City, Missouri	MO	Active	
XP 4149	Preceptor Beta Zeta		Lordsburg, New Mexico	NM	Active	
XP 4151	Preceptor Gamma Beta		Phoenix, Arizona	AZ	Active	
XP 4152	Preceptor Beta Eta		Piedmont, West Virginia	WV	Active	
XP 4155	Preceptor Epsilon Omega		Kingston, Ontario, Canada	ON	Active	
XP 4157	Preceptor Gamma Pi		Lincoln City, Oregon	OR	Active	
XP 4160	Preceptor Omicron Rho		Bedford, Texas	TX	Active	
XP 4161	Preceptor Omicron Eta		Orland, California	CA	Active	
XP 4164	Preceptor Zeta Zeta		St. Petersburg, Florida	FL	Active	
XP 4165	Preceptor Alpha Alpha		Billings, Montana	MT	Active	
XP 4166	Preceptor Zeta Psi		Anna, Illinois	IL	Active	
XP 4170	Preceptor Delta Pi		Fort Madison, Iowa	IA	Active	
XP 4171	Preceptor Alpha Xi		Green Creek, New Jersey	NJ	Active	
XP 4183	Preceptor Delta Iota		Bloomsburg, Pennsylvania	PA	Active	
XP 4184	Preceptor Alpha Zeta		Greenville, South Carolina	SC	Active	
XP 4186	Preceptor Omicron Tau		Hallettsville, Texas	TX	Active	
XP 4188	Preceptor Delta Alpha		Revelstoke, British Columbia, Canada	BC	Active	
XP 4192	Preceptor Omicron Phi		Albany, Texas	TX	Active	
XP 4193	Preceptor Omicron Chi		Southlake, Texas	TX	Active	
XP 4196	Preceptor Delta Zeta		Parksville, British Columbia, Canada	BC	Active	
XP 4199	Preceptor Alpha Omega		Chestermere, Alberta, Canada	AB	Active	
XP 4205	Preceptor Omicron Psi		Bedford, Texas	TX	Active	
XP 4207	Preceptor Beta Iota		Van Buren, Arkansas	AR	Active	
XP 4212	Preceptor Beta Upsilon		Wellsville, New York	NY	Active	
XP 4214	Preceptor Delta Chi		Hays, Kansas	KS	Active	
XP 4217	Preceptor Delta Rho		Hampton, Virginia	VA	Active	
XP 4218	Preceptor Kappa		Gulfport, Mississippi	MS	Active	
XP 4219	Preceptor Eta Eta		Melbourne, Florida	FL	Active	
XP 4223	Preceptor Beta Delta		Falls City, Nebraska	NE	Active	
XP 4224	Preceptor Delta Kappa		State College, Pennsylvania	PA	Active	
XP 4229	Preceptor Alpha Kappa		Okotoks, Alberta, Canada	AB	Active	
XP 423	Preceptor Gamma		Racine, Wisconsin	WI	Active	
XP 4238	Preceptor Beta Lambda		Fayetteville, Arkansas	AR	Active	
XP 4239	Preceptor Gamma Gamma		Sun Lakes, Arizona	AZ	Active	
XP 4241	Preceptor Alpha Mu		Birmingham, Alabama	AL	Active	
XP 4244	Preceptor Zeta Beta		Trenton, Ontario, Canada	ON	Active	
XP 4245	Preceptor Epsilon Beta		Perry, Kansas	KS	Active	
XP 4247	Preceptor Eta Psi		Pleasant Hill, Missouri	MO	Active	
XP 4252	Preceptor Delta Lambda		Muncy, Pennsylvania	PA	Active	
XP 4253	Preceptor Pi Alpha		Kingsland, Texas	TX	Active	
XP 4254	Preceptor Epsilon Gamma		Topeka, Kansas	KS	Active	
XP 4255	Preceptor Delta Zeta		Manitou Beach, Michigan	MI	Active	
XP 4256	Preceptor Beta Delta		Covington, Louisiana	LA	Active	
XP 4258	Preceptor Beta Chi		Lowville, New York	NY	Active	
XP 4263	Preceptor Epsilon Delta		Chanute, Kansas	KS	Active	
XP 4264	Preceptor Alpha Theta		Apple Valley, Minnesota	MN	Active	
XP 4269	Preceptor Gamma Sigma		Ridgeway, Virginia	VA	Active	
XP 4271	Preceptor Alpha Beta		Saskatoon, Saskatchewan, Canada	SK	Active	
XP 4273	Preceptor Epsilon Epsilon		Olathe, Kansas	KS	Active	
XP 4274	Preceptor Omega		Selbyville, Delaware	DE	Active	
XP 4276	Preceptor Pi Beta		Rio Grande City, Texas	TX	Active	
XP 4280	Preceptor Pi Delta		Brownfield, Texas	TX	Active	
XP 4281	Preceptor Pi Epsilon		Rockdale, Texas	TX	Active	
XP 4282	Preceptor Eta Omega		Kearney, Missouri	MO	Active	
XP 4284	Preceptor Alpha Gamma		Regina, Saskatchewan, Canada	SK	Active	
XP 4286	Preceptor Alpha Theta		Lexington, South Carolina	SC	Active	
XP 4288	Preceptor Eta Epsilon		Middleport, Ohio	OH	Active	
XP 4290	Preceptor Beta Phi		North Wilkesboro, North Carolina	NC	Active	
XP 4291	Preceptor Omicron Xi		Camarillo, California	CA	Active	
XP 4292	Preceptor Pi Eta		Granbury, Texas	TX	Active	
XP 4293	Preceptor Delta Theta		Traverse City, Michigan	MI	Active	
XP 4295	Preceptor Delta Xi		Norristown, Pennsylvania	PA	Active	
XP 4296	Preceptor Pi Theta		Universal City, Texas	TX	Active	
XP 4299	Preceptor Delta Kappa		Comox, British Columbia, Canada	BC	Active	
XP 4301	Preceptor Gamma Eta		Chandler, Arizona	AZ	Active	
XP 4303	Preceptor Pi Kappa		Bridgeport, Texas	TX	Active	
XP 4307	Preceptor Beta Epsilon		Gering, Nebraska	NE	Active	
XP 4309	Preceptor Pi Lambda		West Columbia, Texas	TX	Active	
XP 4313	Preceptor Beta Psi		Clifton Park, New York	NY	Active	
XP 4318	Preceptor Iota		Montreal, Quebec, Canada	QC	Active	
XP 4320	Preceptor Iota Chi		Naples, Florida	FL	Active	
XP 4324	Preceptor Delta Psi		Waverly, Iowa	IA	Active	
XP 4326	Preceptor Delta Mu		North Vancouver, British Columbia, Canada	BC	Active	
XP 4330	Preceptor Epsilon Theta		Hiawatha, Kansas	KS	Active	
XP 4331	Preceptor Delta Lambda		Lafayette, Indiana	IN	Active	
XP 4334	Preceptor Gamma Upsilon		Centreville, Virginia	VA	Active	
XP 4337	Preceptor Theta Zeta		Salisbury, Missouri	MO	Active	
XP 4338	Preceptor Beta Psi		Concord, North Carolina	NC	Active	
XP 4339	Preceptor Pi Nu		Gilmer, Texas	TX	Active	
XP 4341	Preceptor Gamma Rho		Lawton, Oklahoma	OK	Active	
XP 4345	Preceptor Beta Kappa		Savannah, Georgia	GA	Active	
XP 4346	Preceptor Alpha Iota		Cumberland, Maryland	MD	Active	
XP 4350	Preceptor Theta Iota		Lake Ozark, Missouri	MO	Active	
XP 4352	Preceptor Alpha Zeta		Danville, Kentucky	KY	Active	
XP 4353	Preceptor Omicron Pi		Miami, Florida	FL	Active	
XP 4354	Preceptor Beta Lambda		Newnan, Georgia	GA	Active	
XP 4356	Preceptor Theta Kappa		Springfield, Missouri	MO	Active	
XP 4358	Preceptor Theta		Corner Brook, Newfoundland and Labrador, Canada	NL	Active	
XP 4359	Preceptor Omicron Rho		Coral Springs, Florida	FL	Active	
XP 4362	Preceptor Alpha Epsilon		Gardnerville, Nevada	NV	Active	
XP 4364	Preceptor Beta Zeta		Omaha, Nebraska	NE	Active	
XP 4365	Preceptor Omicron Rho		Vallejo, California	CA	Active	
XP 4366	Preceptor Pi Omicron		Rio Grande City, Texas	TX	Active	
XP 4368	Preceptor Lambda		Meridian, Mississippi	MS	Active	
XP 4372	Preceptor Gamma Psi		Manassas, Virginia	VA	Active	
XP 4375	Preceptor Mu		Natchez, Mississippi	MS	Active	
XP 4378	Preceptor Pi Rho		Taylor, Texas	TX	Active	
XP 4379	Preceptor Kappa Beta		Sun City Center, Florida	FL	Active	
XP 4380	Preceptor Alpha Nu		Fairhope, Alabama	AL	Active	
XP 4382	Preceptor Beta Epsilon		Baton Rouge, Louisiana	LA	Active	
XP 4386	Preceptor Alpha Kappa		St. Leonard, Maryland	MD	Active	
XP 4387	Preceptor Pi Sigma		Waxahachie, Texas	TX	Active	
XP 4391	Preceptor Omicron Tau		Escondido, California	CA	Active	
XP 4392	Preceptor Gamma Sigma		Edmond, Oklahoma	OK	Active	
XP 4393	Preceptor Gamma Omega		Fairfax, Virginia	VA	Active	
XP 4394	Preceptor Eta Delta		Carbondale, Illinois	IL	Active	
XP 4396	Preceptor Gamma Tau		Oklahoma City, Oklahoma	OK	Active	
XP 4397	Preceptor Alpha Alpha		Werribee, Victoria, Australia	VIC	Active	
XP 4400	Preceptor Delta Omega		Council Bluffs, Iowa	IA	Active	
XP 4403	Preceptor Beta Lambda		Nashville, Tennessee	TN	Active	
XP 4405	Preceptor Kappa Gamma		Brooksville, Florida	FL	Active	
XP 4406	Preceptor Delta Xi		Noblesville, Indiana	IN	Active	
XP 4408	Preceptor Gamma Lambda		Chandler, Arizona	AZ	Active	
XP 4409	Preceptor Zeta Iota		Windsor, Ontario, Canada	ON	Active	
XP 4410	Preceptor Gamma Nu		Phoenix, Arizona	AZ	Active	
XP 4411	Preceptor Zeta Kappa		Goderich, Ontario, Canada	ON	Active	
XP 4412	Preceptor Omicron Upsilon		Elk Grove, California	CA	Active	
XP 4413	Preceptor Pi Upsilon		Austin, Texas	TX	Active	
XP 4415	Preceptor Kappa Epsilon		Weeki Wachee, Florida	FL	Active	
XP 4416	Preceptor Beta Nu		Gainesville, Georgia	GA	Active	
XP 4417	Preceptor Beta Nu		Rogers, Arkansas	AR	Active	
XP 4418	Preceptor Omicron Phi		San Jose, California	CA	Active	
XP 4419	Preceptor Alpha Xi		Gulf Shores, Alabama	AL	Active	
XP 4420	Preceptor Kappa Zeta		North Fort Myers, Florida	FL	Active	
XP 4421	Preceptor Zeta Lambda		Windsor, Ontario, Canada	ON	Active	

=== Laureate chapters ===
Following are the active Laureate chapters of Beta Sigma Phi as of 2026.

Number	Chapter	Charter date and range	Location	State or province	Status	Ref.
PL 100	Laureate Alpha		Centralia, Illinois	IL	Active	
PL 101	Laureate Alpha		Sarasota, Florida	FL	Active	
PL 105	Laureate Beta		Sacramento, California	CA	Active	
PL 110	Laureate Alpha		Medicine Hat, Alberta, Canada	AB	Active	
PL 111	Laureate Alpha		Roseburg, Oregon	OR	Active	
PL 113	Laureate Alpha		Pueblo, Colorado	CO	Active	
PL 114	Laureate Alpha		Cynthiana, Kentucky	KY	Active	
PL 115	Laureate Alpha		Missoula, Montana	MT	Active	
PL 116	Laureate Alpha		Columbia, South Carolina	SC	Active	
PL 117	Laureate Beta		Trenton, Missouri	MO	Active	
PL 121	Laureate Beta		Council Bluffs, Iowa	IA	Active	
PL 123	Laureate Beta		Waukegan, Illinois	IL	Active	
PL 124	Laureate Alpha		Kansas City, Missouri	MO	Active	
PL 125	Laureate Alpha		New Orleans, Louisiana	LA	Active	
PL 126	Laureate Gamma		Owosso, Michigan	MI	Active	
PL 128	Laureate Beta		Longview, Washington	WA	Active	
PL 131	Laureate Beta		Calgary, Alberta, Canada	AB	Active	
PL 133	Laureate Alpha		Huntsville, Alabama	AL	Active	
PL 140	Laureate Gamma		Seattle, Washington	WA	Active	
PL 143	Laureate Alpha		Little Rock, Arkansas	AR	Active	
PL 148	Laureate Alpha		Albuquerque, New Mexico	NM	Active	
PL 154	Laureate Alpha		Scottsdale, Arizona	AZ	Active	
PL 155	Laureate Eta		Fullerton, California	CA	Active	
PL 156	Laureate Alpha		Windsor, Ontario, Canada	ON	Active	
PL 163	Laureate Beta		Bradenton, Florida	FL	Active	
PL 168	Laureate Kappa		Fresno, California	CA	Active	
PL 170	Laureate Alpha		Regina, Saskatchewan, Canada	SK	Active	
PL 172	Laureate Alpha		Guthrie, Oklahoma	OK	Active	
PL 173	Laureate Lambda		Alturas, California	CA	Active	
PL 175	Laureate Gamma		Edmonton, Alberta, Canada	AB	Active	
PL 184	Laureate Delta		Albuquerque, New Mexico	NM	Active	
PL 194	Laureate Delta		Sudbury, Ontario, Canada	ON	Active	
PL 195	Laureate Gamma		Dalhart, Texas	TX	Active	
PL 196	Laureate Beta		Lexington, Kentucky	KY	Active	
PL 198	Laureate Epsilon		Brantford, Ontario, Canada	ON	Active	
PL 200	Laureate Mu		Ontario, California	CA	Active	
PL 201	Laureate Gamma		Marysville, Kansas	KS	Active	
PL 206	Laureate Eta		Moberly, Missouri	MO	Active	
PL 207	Laureate Beta		Statesboro, Georgia	GA	Active	
PL 210	Laureate Gamma		Astoria, Oregon	OR	Active	
PL 211	Laureate Zeta		Brockville, Ontario, Canada	ON	Active	
PL 212	Laureate Alpha		Biloxi, Mississippi	MS	Active	
PL 219	Laureate Delta		Dayton, Ohio	OH	Active	
PL 227	Laureate Beta		Boulder City, Nevada	NV	Active	
PL 228	Laureate Delta		Glendale, Arizona	AZ	Active	
PL 229	Laureate Epsilon		Portland, Oregon	OR	Active	
PL 239	Laureate Delta		La Porte, Texas	TX	Active	
PL 240	Laureate Beta		Billings, Montana	MT	Active	
PL 242	Laureate Delta		Key West, Florida	FL	Active	
PL 245	Laureate Gamma		Brigham City, Utah	UT	Active	
PL 246	Laureate Rho		San Francisco, California	CA	Active	
PL 253	Laureate Lambda		Ottawa, Ontario, Canada	ON	Active	
PL 264	Laureate Beta		Rapid City, South Dakota	SD	Active	
PL 265	Laureate Alpha		Boise, Idaho	ID	Active	
PL 270	Laureate Tau		Glendale, California	CA	Active	
PL 272	Laureate Lambda		North Kansas City, Missouri	MO	Active	
PL 274	Laureate Zeta		Havana, Illinois	IL	Active	
PL 276	Laureate Delta		Pine Bluff, Arkansas	AR	Active	
PL 284	Laureate Nu		Shelton, Washington	WA	Active	
PL 287	Laureate Beta		New Bern, North Carolina	NC	Active	
PL 298	Laureate Upsilon		Woodland, California	CA	Active	
PL 301	Laureate Alpha		Halifax, Nova Scotia, Canada	NS	Active	
PL 312	Laureate Iota		Columbus, Ohio	OH	Active	
PL 314	Laureate Zeta		Tempe, Arizona	AZ	Active	
PL 315	Laureate Omicron		Seattle, Washington	WA	Active	
PL 325	Laureate Theta		Portland, Oregon	OR	Active	
PL 326	Laureate Iota		Vero Beach, Florida	FL	Active	
PL 331	Laureate Nu		London, Ontario, Canada	ON	Active	
PL 232	Laureate Iota		St. Catharines, Ontario, Canada	ON	Active	
PL 309	Laureate Kappa		Cortez, Colorado	CO	Active	
PL 334	Laureate Beta		Lafayette, Louisiana	LA	Active	
PL 338	Laureate Kappa		West Palm Beach, Florida	FL	Active	
PL 345	Laureate Kappa		Brookfield, Missouri	MO	Active	
PL 346	Laureate Gamma		Rome, Georgia	GA	Active	
PL 347	Laureate Delta		Victoria, British Columbia, Canada	BC	Active	
PL 348	Laureate Pi		Tacoma, Washington	WA	Active	
PL 350	Laureate Alpha		Fredericton, New Brunswick, Canada	NB	Active	
PL 351	Laureate Iota		Hood River, Oregon	OR	Active	
PL 354	Laureate Xi		Toronto, Canada	ON	Active	
PL 359	Laureate Omicron		Sarnia, Ontario, Canada	ON	Active	
PL 363	Laureate Epsilon		Las Vegas, Nevada	NV	Active	
PL 365	Laureate Delta		Lethbridge, Alberta, Canada	AB	Active	
PL 368	Laureate Mu		Baytown, Texas	TX	Active	
PL 376	Laureate Lambda		Ironton, Ohio	OH	Active	
PL 382	Laureate Epsilon		Kamloops, British Columbia, Canada	BC	Active	
PL 383	Laureate Zeta		Vancouver, British Columbia, Canada	BC	Active	
PL 385	Laureate Eta		Eagle Grove, Iowa	IA	Active	
PL 386	Laureate Delta		Caldwell, Idaho	ID	Active	
PL 387	Laureate Pi		London, Ontario, Canada	ON	Active	
PL 389	Laureate Delta		Macon, Georgia	GA	Active	
PL 393	Laureate Nu		Carrollton, Missouri	MO	Active	
PL 395	Laureate Alpha Theta		San Jose, California	CA	Active	
PL 404	Laureate Epsilon		Hot Springs, Arkansas	AR	Active	
PL 406	Laureate Eta		Prince George, British Columbia, Canada	BC	Active	
PL 408	Laureate Theta		Silver City, New Mexico	NM	Active	
PL 409	Laureate Alpha Kappa		Escondido, California	CA	Active	
PL 421	Laureate Epsilon		Edmonton, Alberta, Canada	AB	Active	
PL 423	Laureate Rho		Lamar, Colorado	CO	Active	
PL 427	Laureate Omicron		Crestview, Florida	FL	Active	
PL 444	Laureate Zeta		Calgary, Alberta, Canada	AB	Active	
PL 447	Laureate Nu		Albany, Oregon	OR	Active	
PL 448	Laureate Tau		Seattle, Washington	WA	Active	
PL 455	Laureate Sigma		Belleville, Ontario, Canada	ON	Active	
PL 457	Laureate Sigma		Garland, Texas	TX	Active	
PL 458	Laureate Sigma		Elyria, Ohio	OH	Active	
PL 462	Laureate Epsilon		Moscow, Idaho	ID	Active	
PL 463	Laureate Tau		St. Thomas, Ontario, Canada	ON	Active	
PL 465	Laureate Upsilon		Stratford, Ontario, Canada	ON	Active	
PL 483	Laureate Lambda		Wichita, Kansas	KS	Active	
PL 484	Laureate Phi		Ottawa, Ontario, Canada	ON	Active	
PL 486	Laureate Alpha Pi		Sunnyvale, California	CA	Active	
PL 489	Laureate Zeta		Martinsburg, West Virginia	WV	Active	
PL 491	Laureate Psi		Pasadena, Texas	TX	Active	
PL 493	Laureate Beta		Fairbanks, Alaska	AK	Active	
PL 496	Laureate Xi		Coos Bay, Oregon	OR	Active	
PL 502	Laureate Alpha Tau		Chula Vista, California	CA	Active	
PL 510	Laureate Alpha Alpha		Bryan, Texas	TX	Active	
PL 521	Laureate Gamma		Pikeville, Kentucky	KY	Active	
PL 524	Laureate Epsilon		Luray, Virginia	VA	Active	
PL 527	Laureate Chi		Yakima, Washington	WA	Active	
PL 528	Laureate Alpha Alpha		Kingston, Ontario, Canada	ON	Active	
PL 531	Laureate Epsilon		North Platte, Nebraska	NE	Active	
PL 532	Laureate Psi		Yakima, Washington	WA	Active	
PL 536	Laureate Beta		St. John's, Newfoundland and Labrador, Canada	NL	Active	
PL 537	Laureate Xi		Lewistown, Pennsylvania	PA	Active	
PL 538	Laureate Alpha Gamma		Oshawa, Ontario, Canada	ON	Active	
PL 540	Laureate Eta		Edmonton, Alberta, Canada	AB	Active	
PL 542	Laureate Omicron		Sunbury, Pennsylvania	PA	Active	
PL 544	Laureate Beta		Adelaide, South Australia, Australia	SA	Active	
PL 549	Laureate Chi		Sarasota, Florida	FL	Active	
PL 554	Laureate Lambda		North Vancouver, British Columbia, Canada	BC	Active	
PL 573	Laureate Gamma		Charlotte, North Carolina	NC	Active	
PL 576	Laureate Omega		Xenia, Ohio	OH	Active	
PL 590	Laureate Pi		Medford, Oregon	OR	Active	
PL 592	Laureate Nu		Overland Park, Kansas	KS	Active	
PL 593	Laureate Zeta		Buffalo, New York	NY	Active	
PL 602	Laureate Theta		Boise, Idaho	ID	Active	
PL 609	Laureate Alpha Iota		Houston, Texas	TX	Active	
PL 613	Laureate Alpha Delta		Auburn, Washington	WA	Active	
PL 621	Laureate Alpha Kappa		Arlington, Texas	TX	Active	
PL 627	Laureate Beta		Charleston, South Carolina	SC	Active	
PL 635	Laureate Alpha Epsilon		Gainesville, Florida	FL	Active	
PL 645	Laureate Alpha Eta		Moses Lake, Washington	WA	Active	
PL 646	Laureate Alpha Epsilon		Kitchener, Ontario, Canada	ON	Active	
PL 647	Laureate Alpha Nu		McAllen, Texas	TX	Active	
PL 651	Laureate Beta Nu		Fountain Valley, California	CA	Active	
PL 653	Laureate Epsilon		Kaysville, Utah	UT	Active	
PL 656	Laureate Alpha Zeta		Jacksonville, Florida	FL	Active	
PL 663	Laureate Rho		Valley Forge, Pennsylvania	PA	Active	
PL 667	Laureate Theta		Vinita, Oklahoma	OK	Active	
PL 669	Laureate Alpha Theta		Everett, Washington	WA	Active	
PL 671	Laureate Epsilon		Lexington, Kentucky	KY	Active	
PL 675	Laureate Alpha Zeta		Trenton, Ontario, Canada	ON	Active	
PL 677	Laureate Nu		Grants, New Mexico	NM	Active	
PL 683	Laureate Beta Rho		Sanger, California	CA	Active	
PL 697	Laureate Alpha Kappa		Chehalis, Washington	WA	Active	
PL 702	Laureate Theta		Syracuse, New York	NY	Active	
PL 713	Laureate Tau		Ashland, Oregon	OR	Active	
PL 714	Laureate Beta		Portland, Maine	ME	Active	
PL 719	Laureate Xi		Socorro, New Mexico	NM	Active	
PL 726	Laureate Upsilon		Portland, Oregon	OR	Active	
PL 729	Laureate Alpha Iota		Clearwater, Florida	FL	Active	
PL 737	Laureate Alpha Tau		Fort Worth, Texas	TX	Active	
PL 742	Laureate Beta Upsilon		Chico, California	CA	Active	
PL 746	Laureate Alpha Lambda		Cheney, Washington	WA	Active	
PL 751	Laureate Zeta		Cheyenne, Wyoming	WY	Active	
PL 755	Laureate Alpha Psi		Odessa, Texas	TX	Active	
PL 756	Laureate Beta Phi		Modesto, California	CA	Active	
PL 768	Laureate Epsilon		Halifax, Nova Scotia, Canada	NS	Active	
PL 770	Laureate Epsilon		Yorkton, Saskatchewan, Canada	SK	Active	
PL 772	Laureate Alpha Epsilon		Zanesville, Ohio	OH	Active	
PL 778	Laureate Alpha Mu		Longview, Washington	WA	Active	
PL 787	Laureate Sigma		Ottawa, Kansas	KS	Active	
PL 789	Laureate Alpha Epsilon		Effingham, Illinois	IL	Active	
PL 790	Laureate Alpha Zeta		Flora, Illinois	IL	Active	
PL 804	Laureate Tau		Penticton, British Columbia, Canada	BC	Active	
PL 810	Laureate Alpha Nu		Sedro-Woolley, Washington	WA	Active	
PL 813	Laureate Beta		Milford, Delaware	DE	Active	
PL 815	Laureate Epsilon		Minot, North Dakota	ND	Active	
PL 820	Laureate Beta Zeta		Fort Worth, Texas	TX	Active	
PL 830	Laureate Alpha Mu		Windsor, Ontario, Canada	ON	Active	
PL 833	Laureate Lambda		Norfolk, Virginia	VA	Active	
PL 839	Laureate Gamma Alpha		San Jose, California	CA	Active	
PL 841	Laureate Xi		Fort Dodge, Iowa	IA	Active	
PL 842	Laureate Alpha Xi		London, Ontario, Canada	ON	Active	
PL 844	Laureate Iota		Madison, Wisconsin	WI	Active	
PL 849	Laureate Beta		Kailua, Hawaii	HI	Active	
PL 854	Laureate Alpha Pi		Ephrata, Washington	WA	Active	
PL 855	Laureate Kappa		Merrill, Wisconsin	WI	Active	
PL 862	Laureate Pi		Cedar Rapids, Iowa	IA	Active	
PL 866	Laureate Gamma Zeta		Rialto, California	CA	Active	
PL 869	Laureate Lambda		Salmon, Idaho	ID	Active	
PL 874	Laureate Rho		Greensburg, Indiana	IN	Active	
PL 879	Laureate Zeta		Mitchell, South Dakota	SD	Active	
PL 883	Laureate Alpha Lambda		Marion, Ohio	OH	Active	
PL 885	Laureate Mu		Idaho Falls, Idaho	ID	Active	
PL 886	Laureate Delta		Minneapolis, Minnesota	MN	Active	
PL 888	Laureate Omega		Warren, Michigan	MI	Active	
PL 889	Laureate Beta Mu		Cleburne, Texas	TX	Active	
PL 896	Laureate Gamma Lambda		Bakersfield, California	CA	Active	
PL 907	Laureate Chi		Pratt, Kansas	KS	Active	
PL 914	Laureate Phi		Victoria, British Columbia, Canada	BC	Active	
PL 925	Laureate Alpha Omicron		Ottawa, Ontario, Canada	ON	Active	
PL 949	Laureate Zeta		Cleveland, Tennessee	TN	Active	
PL 950	Laureate Alpha Tau		Bremerton, Washington	WA	Active	
PL 954	Laureate Alpha Beta		Independence, Kansas	KS	Active	
PL 958	Laureate Gamma		Souris, Manitoba, Canada	MB	Active	
PL 965	Laureate Gamma Upsilon		Auburn, California	CA	Active	
PL 966	Laureate Upsilon		Des Moines, Iowa	IA	Active	
PL 973	Laureate Beta Tau		Gonzales, Texas	TX	Active	
PL 974	Laureate Tau		Clovis, New Mexico	NM	Active	
PL 979	Laureate Gamma Omega		Riverside, California	CA	Active	
PL 980	Laureate Mu		Hastings, Nebraska	NE	Active	
PL 982	Laureate Iota		Watertown, New York	NY	Active	
PL 991	Laureate Alpha Pi		Barrie, Ontario, Canada	ON	Active	
PL 993	Laureate Gamma		Fort Fairfield, Maine	ME	Active	
PL 996	Laureate Alpha Omicron		Joplin, Missouri	MO	Active	
PL 999	Laureate Psi		Logansport, Indiana	IN	Active	
PL 1000	Laureate Nu		Aurora, Nebraska	NE	Active	
PL 1017	Laureate Iota		Buffalo, Wyoming	WY	Active	
PL 1018	Laureate Epsilon		Glasgow, Montana	MT	Active	
PL 1021	Laureate Theta		Las Vegas, Nevada	NV	Active	
PL 1022	Laureate Alpha Rho		Columbus, Ohio	OH	Active	
PL 1024	Laureate Alpha Xi		Edwardsville, Illinois	IL	Active	
PL 1027	Laureate Kappa		Henderson, Nevada	NV	Active	
PL 1029	Laureate Alpha Sigma		Cleveland, Ohio	OH	Active	
PL 1032	Laureate Alpha Phi		Paris, Ontario, Canada	ON	Active	
PL 1034	Laureate Alpha Chi		Pullman, Washington	WA	Active	
PL 1036	Laureate Alpha Delta		McKeesport, Pennsylvania	PA	Active	
PL 1039	Laureate Delta Epsilon		Harrisburg, Pennsylvania	PA	Active	
PL 1046	Laureate Xi		Kenosha, Wisconsin	WI	Active	
PL 1053	Laureate Zeta		Brookfield, Nova Scotia, Canada	NS	Active	
PL 1056	Laureate Eta		Clarksville, Tennessee	TN	Active	
PL 1058	Laureate Zeta		Williston, North Dakota	ND	Active	
PL 1067	Laureate Upsilon		Virginia Beach, Virginia	VA	Active	
PL 1075	Laureate Alpha Phi		Cleveland, Ohio	OH	Active	
PL 1077	Laureate Alpha Sigma		Panama City, Florida	FL	Active	
PL 1084	Laureate Alpha Chi		Youngstown, Ohio	OH	Active	
PL 1085	Laureate Alpha Tau		Sanford, Florida	FL	Active	
PL 1087	Laureate Eta		Camden, New Jersey	NJ	Active	
PL 1091	Laureate Zeta		Regina, Saskatchewan, Canada	SK	Active	
PL 1102	Laureate Phi		Lovington, New Mexico	NM	Active	
PL 1107	Laureate Gamma Gamma		Spearman, Texas	TX	Active	
PL 1118	Laureate Alpha Upsilon		West DeLand, Florida	FL	Active	
PL 1119	Laureate Alpha Omega		Sault Ste. Marie, Ontario, Canada	ON	Active	
PL 1123	Laureate Gamma Epsilon		Waco, Texas	TX	Active	
PL 1130	Laureate Gamma Zeta		El Paso, Texas	TX	Active	
PL 1134	Laureate Delta Xi		Needles, California	CA	Active	
PL 1141	Laureate Alpha Phi		Orlando, Florida	FL	Active	
PL 1143	Laureate Epsilon		McComb, Mississippi	MS	Active	
PL 1145	Laureate Nu		Cushing, Oklahoma	OK	Active	
PL 1147	Laureate Alpha Zeta		Kane, Pennsylvania	PA	Active	
PL 1153	Laureate Lambda		Statesboro, Georgia	GA	Active	
PL 1156	Laureate Beta Epsilon		London, Ontario, Canada	ON	Active	
PL 1162	Laureate Beta Zeta		Newmarket, Ontario, Canada	ON	Active	
PL 1168	Laureate Zeta		Augusta, Maine	ME	Active	
PL 1180	Laureate Chi		Manassas, Virginia	VA	Active	
PL 1183	Laureate Alpha Chi		Cocoa, Florida	FL	Active	
PL 1185	Laureate Alpha Psi		Albany, Missouri	MO	Active	
PL 1186	Laureate Alpha Xi		Wichita, Kansas	KS	Active	
PL 1189	Laureate Lambda		Sherwood Park, Alberta, Canada	AB	Active	
PL 1190	Laureate Alpha Beta		Campbell River, British Columbia, Canada	BC	Active	
PL 1195	Laureate Beta Eta		Brantford, Ontario, Canada	ON	Active	
PL 1220	Laureate Eta		Prince Albert, Saskatchewan, Canada	SK	Active	
PL 1221	Laureate Alpha Eta		Denver, Colorado	CO	Active	
PL 1224	Laureate Alpha Gamma		Decorah, Iowa	IA	Active	
PL 1231	Laureate Alpha Eta		Bethlehem, Pennsylvania	PA	Active	
PL 1232	Laureate Beta Lambda		Goderich, Ontario, Canada	ON	Active	
PL 1241	Laureate Alpha Epsilon		Muscatine, Iowa	IA	Active	
PL 1243	Laureate Beta Delta		Pasco, Washington	WA	Active	
PL 1245	Laureate Alpha Alpha		Surrey, British Columbia, Canada	BC	Active	
PL 1250	Laureate Gamma Pi		Seguin, Texas	TX	Active	
PL 1254	Laureate Epsilon Gamma		Oroville, California	CA	Active	
PL 1267	Laureate Alpha Epsilon		Langley, British Columbia, Canada	BC	Active	
PL 1268	Laureate Gamma Rho		Perryton, Texas	TX	Active	
PL 1271	Laureate Beta Mu		Lindsay, Ontario, Canada	ON	Active	
PL 1276	Laureate Nu		Warner Robins, Georgia	GA	Active	
PL 1279	Laureate Beta Eta		Bellingham, Washington	WA	Active	
PL 1280	Laureate Alpha Zeta		Richmond, British Columbia, Canada	BC	Active	
PL 1283	Laureate Alpha Eta		Abbotsford, British Columbia, Canada	BC	Active	
PL 1289	Laureate Eta		Palmer, Alaska	AK	Active	
PL 1292	Laureate Theta		Florence, Alabama	AL	Active	
PL 1293	Laureate Iota		Alexander City, Alabama	AL	Active	
PL 1296	Laureate Beta Epsilon		Toledo, Ohio	OH	Active	
PL 1306	Laureate Nu		Conway, Arkansas	AR	Active	
PL 1310	Laureate Gamma Phi		Austin, Texas	TX	Active	
PL 1317	Laureate Alpha Theta		New Westminster, British Columbia, Canada	BC	Active	
PL 1318	Laureate Alpha Alpha		Deming, New Mexico	NM	Active	
PL 1326	Laureate Alpha Beta		Anthony, New Mexico	NM	Active	
PL 1327	Laureate Alpha Iota		Parksville, British Columbia, Canada	BC	Active	
PL 1333	Laureate Alpha Upsilon		Harrisburg, Illinois	IL	Active	
PL 1334	Laureate Tau		Wallace, Idaho	ID	Active	
PL 1357	Laureate Omega		Yuma, Arizona	AZ	Active	
PL 1366	Laureate Epsilon Kappa		China Lake, California	CA	Active	
PL 1369	Laureate Zeta		Charleston, South Carolina	SC	Active	
PL 1372	Laureate Theta		Billings, Montana	MT	Active	
PL 1375	Laureate Alpha Kappa		Knoxville, Iowa	IA	Active	
PL 1386	Laureate Beta Iota		Harrisonville, Missouri	MO	Active	
PL 1388	Laureate Lambda		Casper, Wyoming	WY	Active	
PL 1390	Laureate Epsilon Nu		Laguna Woods, California	CA	Active	
PL 1395	Laureate Mu		Douglas, Wyoming	WY	Active	
PL 1396	Laureate Eta		Greenville, South Carolina	SC	Active	
PL 1399	Laureate Epsilon Omicron		Newport Beach, California	CA	Active	
PL 1406	Laureate Alpha Mu		Vernon, British Columbia, Canada	BC	Active	
PL 1407	Laureate Alpha Nu		Kamloops, British Columbia, Canada	BC	Active	
PL 1412	Laureate Kappa		Tooele, Utah	UT	Active	
PL 1413	Laureate Epsilon Sigma		Santa Rosa, California	CA	Active	
PL 1416	Laureate Nu		Cody, Wyoming	WY	Active	
PL 1425	Laureate Lambda		Memphis, Tennessee	TN	Active	
PL 1428	Laureate Delta Eta		Abilene, Texas	TX	Active	
PL 1430	Laureate Omicron		Jamestown, New York	NY	Active	
PL 1438	Laureate Iota		Waterville, Maine	ME	Active	
PL 1440	Laureate Xi		Decatur, Georgia	GA	Active	
PL 1443	Laureate Alpha Lambda		Portland, Oregon	OR	Active	
PL 1445	Laureate Beta Nu		Plant City, Florida	FL	Active	
PL 1448	Laureate Beta Lambda		Toledo, Ohio	OH	Active	
PL 1450	Laureate Delta		Dandenong, Victoria, Australia	VIC	Active	
PL 1487	Laureate Beta Tau		Simcoe, Ontario, Canada	ON	Active	
PL 1495	Laureate Alpha Delta		Ruidoso, New Mexico	NM	Active	
PL 1497	Laureate Phi		Sidney, Nebraska	NE	Active	
PL 1501	Laureate Alpha Upsilon		Garden City, Kansas	KS	Active	
PL 1505	Laureate Alpha Rho		Vancouver, British Columbia, Canada	BC	Active	
PL 1506	Laureate Beta Beta		Vandalia, Illinois	IL	Active	
PL 1507	Laureate Alpha Epsilon		Albuquerque, New Mexico	NM	Active	
PL 1521	Laureate Beta Xi		Cape Girardeau, Missouri	MO	Active	
PL 1539	Laureate Beta Upsilon		Hamilton, Ontario, Canada	ON	Active	
PL 1540	Laureate Alpha Sigma		Vancouver, British Columbia, Canada	BC	Active	
PL 1551	Laureate Beta Xi		Marysville, Washington	WA	Active	
PL 1555	Laureate Kappa		North Battleford, Saskatchewan, Canada	SK	Active	
PL 1557	Laureate Alpha Psi		Olathe, Kansas	KS	Active	
PL 1559	Laureate Phi		Weiser, Idaho	ID	Active	
PL 1562	Laureate Pi		Worland, Wyoming	WY	Active	
PL 1563	Laureate Beta Omega		Burlington, Ontario, Canada	ON	Active	
PL 1564	Laureate Beta Eta		Carbondale, Illinois	IL	Active	
PL 1571	Laureate Beta Iota		Joliet, Illinois	IL	Active	
PL 1576	Laureate Mu		Crowley, Louisiana	LA	Active	
PL 1580	Laureate Gamma Alpha		Gananoque, Ontario, Canada	ON	Active	
PL 1585	Laureate Iota		Havre, Montana	MT	Active	
PL 1588	Laureate Beta Pi		Boonville, Missouri	MO	Active	
PL 1604	Laureate Alpha Rho		Ankeny, Iowa	IA	Active	
PL 1608	Laureate Delta Omega		Austin, Texas	TX	Active	
PL 1615	Laureate Zeta Omicron		Castro Valley, California	CA	Active	
PL 1622	Laureate Omicron		Elberton, Georgia	GA	Active	
PL 1623	Laureate Pi		LaGrange, Georgia	GA	Active	
PL 1632	Laureate Gamma Beta		Brantford, Ontario, Canada	ON	Active	
PL 1633	Laureate Alpha Gamma		Sun City, Arizona	AZ	Active	
PL 1635	Laureate Kappa		Fort Washington, Maryland	MD	Active	
PL 1640	Laureate Gamma Beta		Tampa, Florida	FL	Active	
PL 1645	Laureate Beta Omicron		Centralia, Washington	WA	Active	
PL 1648	Laureate Beta Pi		Toledo, Ohio	OH	Active	
PL 1650	Laureate Zeta Sigma		Concord, California	CA	Active	
PL 1651	Laureate Tau		Utica, New York	NY	Active	
PL 1654	Laureate Beta Rho		Seattle, Washington	WA	Active	
PL 1660	Laureate Beta Mu		Macomb, Illinois	IL	Active	
PL 1662	Laureate Beta Rho		Columbus, Ohio	OH	Active	
PL 1667	Laureate Beta Upsilon		Springfield, Virginia	VA	Active	
PL 1670	Laureate Gamma Epsilon		London, Ontario, Canada	ON	Active	
PL 1675	Laureate Gamma Zeta		Thunder Bay, Ontario, Canada	ON	Active	
PL 1679	Laureate Lambda		Pennsville, New Jersey	NJ	Active	
PL 1680	Laureate Theta		Bismarck, North Dakota	ND	Active	
PL 1681	Laureate Alpha Beta		Staunton, Virginia	VA	Active	
PL 1687	Laureate Rho		Peachtree City, Georgia	GA	Active	
PL 1693	Laureate Beta Sigma		Tacoma, Washington	WA	Active	
PL 1696	Laureate Epsilon Beta		Williamsport, Pennsylvania	PA	Active	
PL 1699	Laureate Alpha Upsilon		St. Clair Shores, Michigan	MI	Active	
PL 1705	Laureate Alpha		Canberra, Australian Capital Territory, Australia	ACT	Active	
PL 1708	Laureate Gamma Zeta		Belle Glade, Florida	FL	Active	
PL 1709	Laureate Sigma		Decatur, Georgia	GA	Active	
PL 1730	Laureate Alpha Delta		Roanoke, Virginia	VA	Active	
PL 1732	Laureate Alpha Omega		Belmond, Iowa	IA	Active	
PL 1739	Laureate Beta Delta		Mission, Kansas	KS	Active	
PL 1748	Laureate Zeta Psi		Long Beach, California	CA	Active	
PL 1751	Laureate Alpha Delta		Elkins, West Virginia	WV	Active	
PL 1752	Laureate Alpha Iota		Roswell, New Mexico	NM	Active	
PL 1756	Laureate Psi		Challis, Idaho	ID	Active	
PL 1761	Laureate Beta Alpha		Jefferson, Iowa	IA	Active	
PL 1764	Laureate Alpha Psi		Prince George, British Columbia, Canada	BC	Active	
PL 1767	Laureate Alpha Epsilon		Lewisburg, West Virginia	WV	Active	
PL 1768	Laureate Kappa		Auburn, Maine	ME	Active	
PL 1771	Laureate Epsilon Mu		Boerne, Texas	TX	Active	
PL 1772	Laureate Phi		Ponca City, Oklahoma	OK	Active	
PL 1780	Laureate Chi		Oklahoma City, Oklahoma	OK	Active	
PL 1790	Laureate Xi		Goldsboro, North Carolina	NC	Active	
PL 1791	Laureate Omega		American Falls, Idaho	ID	Active	
PL 1796	Laureate Epsilon Nu		Ennis, Texas	TX	Active	
PL 1800	Laureate Alpha Chi		Boulder, Colorado	CO	Active	
PL 1802	Laureate Beta Omega		Savannah, Missouri	MO	Active	
PL 1808	Laureate Alpha Phi		Royal Oak, Michigan	MI	Active	
PL 1809	Laureate Xi Xi		Metairie, Louisiana	LA	Active	
PL 1816	Laureate Epsilon Omicron		Houston, Texas	TX	Active	
PL 1832	Laureate Kappa		Valley City, North Dakota	ND	Active	
PL 1833	Laureate Omega		Enid, Oklahoma	OK	Active	
PL 1838	Laureate Beta Beta		Kenner, Louisiana	LA	Active	
PL 1841	Laureate Alpha Psi		Marion, Indiana	IN	Active	
PL 1844	Laureate Beta Gamma		Clinton, Iowa	IA	Active	
PL 1856	Laureate Beta Sigma		Jacksonville, Illinois	IL	Active	
PL 1864	Laureate Alpha Alpha		Nampa, Idaho	ID	Active	
PL 1867	Laureate Beta Epsilon		Calmar, Iowa	IA	Active	
PL 1871	Laureate Upsilon		El Dorado, Arkansas	AR	Active	
PL 1872	Laureate Beta Omega		Crooksville, Ohio	OH	Active	
PL 1873	Laureate Beta Eta		Kismet, Kansas	KS	Active	
PL 1874	Laureate Alpha Tau		St. George, Utah	UT	Active	
PL 1877	Laureate Epsilon Omega		Orange, Texas	TX	Active	
PL 1879	Laureate Alpha Alpha		Chickasha, Oklahoma	OK	Active	
PL 1881	Laureate Alpha Omega		Princeton, Indiana	IN	Active	
PL 1882	Laureate Psi		Niagara Falls, New York	NY	Active	
PL 1886	Laureate Epsilon Nu		Shippensburg, Pennsylvania	PA	Active	
PL 1887	Laureate Beta Gamma		Langley, British Columbia, Canada	BC	Active	
PL 1895	Laureate Gamma Alpha		Liberty, Missouri	MO	Active	
PL 1898	Laureate Alpha Tau		Newport, Oregon	OR	Active	
PL 1914	Laureate Kappa		Detroit Lakes, Minnesota	MN	Active	
PL 1916	Laureate Gamma Beta		Bucyrus, Ohio	OH	Active	
PL 1918	Laureate Gamma Pi		St. Catharines, Ontario, Canada	ON	Active	
PL 1919	Laureate Beta Beta		Grand Rapids, Michigan	MI	Active	
PL 1922	Laureate Gamma Delta		Lexington, Missouri	MO	Active	
PL 1926	Laureate Gamma Rho		Oakville, Ontario, Canada	ON	Active	
PL 1932	Laureate Beta Psi		Sunnyside, Washington	WA	Active	
PL 1933	Laureate Gamma Gamma		Zanesville, Ohio	OH	Active	
PL 1934	Laureate Eta Xi		Lodi, California	CA	Active	
PL 1936	Laureate Nu		Toms River, New Jersey	NJ	Active	
PL 1939	Laureate Alpha Mu		Camp Verde, Arizona	AZ	Active	
PL 1941	Laureate Zeta Epsilon		Port Arthur, Texas	TX	Active	
PL 1943	Laureate Gamma Tau		Nokomis, Florida	FL	Active	
PL 1949	Laureate Omicron		Westminster, Maryland	MD	Active	
PL 1953	Laureate Gamma Epsilon		St. Louis, Missouri	MO	Active	
PL 1960	Laureate Gamma Upsilon		The Villages, Florida	FL	Active	
PL 1965	Laureate Eta Rho		Morro Bay, California	CA	Active	
PL 1973	Laureate Beta Chi		Wheaton, Illinois	IL	Active	
PL 1988	Laureate Gamma Chi		Tampa, Florida	FL	Active	
PL 1992	Laureate Alpha Lambda		Suffolk, Virginia	VA	Active	
PL 1995	Laureate Epsilon Rho		Carlisle, Pennsylvania	PA	Active	
PL 1996	Laureate Beta Omega		Port Orchard, Washington	WA	Active	
PL 2000	Laureate Beta Zeta		Kelowna, British Columbia, Canada	BC	Active	
PL 2008	Laureate Beta Theta		Plymouth, Michigan	MI	Active	
PL 2015	Laureate Omicron		Shreveport, Louisiana	LA	Active	
PL 2017	Laureate Gamma Eta		Hudson, Ohio	OH	Active	
PL 2023	Laureate Beta Omega		Kankakee, Illinois	IL	Active	
PL 2025	Laureate Beta Eta		Delta, British Columbia, Canada	BC	Active	
PL 2037	Laureate Gamma Beta		Spokane, Washington	WA	Active	
PL 2040	Laureate Gamma Phi		Toronto, Canada	ON	Active	
PL 2049	Laureate Alpha Beta		Forrest City, Arkansas	AR	Active	
PL 2050	Laureate Alpha Upsilon		Ashland, Oregon	OR	Active	
PL 2052	Laureate Alpha Omicron		Prescott Valley, Arizona	AZ	Active	
PL 2056	Laureate Gamma Delta		Yakima, Washington	WA	Active	
PL 2061	Laureate Rho		Powell, Wyoming	WY	Active	
PL 2062	Laureate Beta Xi		New Hampton, Iowa	IA	Active	
PL 2063	Laureate Pi		Bowie, Maryland	MD	Active	
PL 2064	Laureate Gamma Alpha		Marion, Illinois	IL	Active	
PL 2071	Laureate Nu		Anderson, South Carolina	SC	Active	
PL 2073	Laureate Tau		Sundance, Wyoming	WY	Active	
PL 2081	Laureate Alpha Lambda		Hobbs, New Mexico	NM	Active	
PL 2084	Laureate Phi		Oak Ridge, Tennessee	TN	Active	
PL 2090	Laureate Alpha Beta		Boise, Idaho	ID	Active	
PL 2092	Laureate Xi		Reno, Nevada	NV	Active	
PL 2095	Laureate Tau		Rocky Mount, North Carolina	NC	Active	
PL 2098	Laureate Nu		Saskatoon, Saskatchewan, Canada	SK	Active	
PL 2099	Laureate Omicron		St. Albert, Alberta, Canada	AB	Active	
PL 2100	Laureate Gamma Eta		Gig Harbor, Washington	WA	Active	
PL 2112	Laureate Alpha Gamma		Sandpoint, Idaho	ID	Active	
PL 2113	Laureate Beta Iota		Port Alberni, British Columbia, Canada	BC	Active	
PL 2120	Laureate Theta Gamma		Covina, California	CA	Active	
PL 2121	Laureate Delta Alpha		Toronto, Canada	ON	Active	
PL 2124	Laureate Gamma Lambda		Belton, Missouri	MO	Active	
PL 2130	Laureate Gamma Omicron		Warren, Ohio	OH	Active	
PL 2139	Laureate Zeta Phi		Borger, Texas	TX	Active	
PL 2140	Laureate Beta Lambda		Penticton, British Columbia, Canada	BC	Active	
PL 2141	Laureate Alpha Mu		Tucumcari, New Mexico	NM	Active	
PL 2143	Laureate Gamma Delta		Paris, Illinois	IL	Active	
PL 2144	Laureate Gamma Mu		Mexico, Missouri	MO	Active	
PL 2153	Laureate Delta Eta		Fort Lauderdale, Florida	FL	Active	
PL 2155	Laureate Gamma Nu		Adrian, Missouri	MO	Active	
PL 2157	Laureate Omicron		Pahrump, Nevada	NV	Active	
PL 2163	Laureate Chi		Salisbury, North Carolina	NC	Active	
PL 2166	Laureate Gamma Omicron		Brookfield, Missouri	MO	Active	
PL 2168	Laureate Zeta Psi		San Antonio, Texas	TX	Active	
PL 2169	Laureate Theta Theta		Rio Vista, California	CA	Active	
PL 2174	Laureate Xi		Rosetown, Saskatchewan, Canada	SK	Active	
PL 2186	Laureate Beta Mu		Kelowna, British Columbia, Canada	BC	Active	
PL 2190	Laureate Delta Theta		Brooksville, Florida	FL	Active	
PL 2206	Laureate Pi		Red Deer, Alberta, Canada	AB	Active	
PL 2212	Laureate Rho		Sherwood Park, Alberta, Canada	AB	Active	
PL 2219	Laureate Beta Delta		Shelbyville, Indiana	IN	Active	
PL 2220	Laureate Theta Omicron		Tulelake, California	CA	Active	
PL 2221	Laureate Beta Omicron		Quesnel, British Columbia, Canada	BC	Active	
PL 2225	Laureate Beta Rho		New Westminster, British Columbia, Canada	BC	Active	
PL 2228	Laureate Beta Epsilon		Jeffersonville, Indiana	IN	Active	
PL 2229	Laureate Omega		Memphis, Tennessee	TN	Active	
PL 2234	Laureate Alpha Beta		Lenoir City, Tennessee	TN	Active	
PL 2238	Laureate Alpha Gamma		Bella Vista, Arkansas	AR	Active	
PL 2240	Laureate Sigma		Mesa, Arizona	AZ	Active	
PL 2255	Laureate Theta Alpha		Levelland, Texas	TX	Active	
PL 2256	Laureate Gamma Upsilon		North Kansas City, Missouri	MO	Active	
PL 2262	Laureate Alpha Zeta		Drumright, Oklahoma	OK	Active	
PL 2263	Laureate Gamma Upsilon		Westerville, Ohio	OH	Active	
PL 2270	Laureate Gamma Psi		Castalia, Ohio	OH	Active	
PL 2275	Laureate Omicron		Brunswick, Maine	ME	Active	
PL 2283	Laureate Gamma Kappa		Tacoma, Washington	WA	Active	
PL 2285	Laureate Beta Tau		Murray, Iowa	IA	Active	
PL 2290	Laureate Zeta Alpha		Hanover, Pennsylvania	PA	Active	
PL 2292	Laureate Alpha Eta		Midwest City, Oklahoma	OK	Active	
PL 2293	Laureate Theta Psi		Susanville, California	CA	Active	
PL 2294	Laureate Theta Omega		Sunnyvale, California	CA	Active	
PL 2300	Laureate Beta Phi		Adrian, Michigan	MI	Active	
PL 2302	Laureate Alpha Psi		Beaverton, Oregon	OR	Active	
PL 2306	Laureate Eta Kappa		Gonzales, Texas	TX	Active	
PL 2317	Laureate Beta Upsilon		Castlegar, British Columbia, Canada	BC	Active	
PL 2318	Laureate Sigma		Grande Prairie, Alberta, Canada	AB	Active	
PL 2324	Laureate Eta Xi		Hamshire, Texas	TX	Active	
PL 2327	Laureate Beta Phi		Council Bluffs, Iowa	IA	Active	
PL 2333	Laureate Tau		Sioux Falls, South Dakota	SD	Active	
PL 2335	Laureate Alpha Zeta		Little Rock, Arkansas	AR	Active	
PL 2343	Laureate Beta Sigma		Woodbridge, Virginia	VA	Active	
PL 2347	Laureate Delta Xi		Lehigh Acres, Florida	FL	Active	
PL 2350	Laureate Beta Omega		Council Bluffs, Iowa	IA	Active	
PL 2353	Laureate Delta Alpha		Sandusky, Ohio	OH	Active	
PL 2354	Laureate Iota Delta		Corona del Mar, Newport Beach, California	CA	Active	
PL 2355	Laureate Alpha Chi		Colonial Heights, Virginia	VA	Active	
PL 2359	Laureate Beta Nu		Larned, Kansas	KS	Active	
PL 2361	Laureate Gamma Omega		Kirkwood, Missouri	MO	Active	
PL 2372	Laureate Alpha Epsilon		Fayetteville, Arkansas	AR	Active	
PL 2374	Laureate Beta Alpha		Phoenix, Arizona	AZ	Active	
PL 2378	Laureate Eta Tau		Canyon, Texas	TX	Active	
PL 2382	Laureate Delta Delta		Marion, Ohio	OH	Active	
PL 2387	Laureate Beta Xi		Dodge City, Kansas	KS	Active	
PL 2390	Laureate Alpha Eta		Oneonta, New York	NY	Active	
PL 2392	Laureate Epsilon Gamma		Hollywood, Florida	FL	Active	
PL 2395	Laureate Lambda		Halifax, Nova Scotia, Canada	NS	Active	
PL 2398	Laureate Beta Phi		Maple Ridge, British Columbia, Canada	BC	Active	
PL 2403	Laureate Delta		Juneau, Alaska	AK	Active	
PL 2409	Laureate Delta Alpha		Blue Springs, Missouri	MO	Active	
PL 2410	Laureate Delta Epsilon		Hamilton, Ohio	OH	Active	
PL 2411	Laureate Alpha Eta		Fort Smith, Arkansas	AR	Active	
PL 2418	Laureate Gamma Mu		Flora, Illinois	IL	Active	
PL 2423	Laureate Eta Omega		Universal City, Texas	TX	Active	
PL 2425	Laureate Alpha Gamma		Knoxville, Tennessee	TN	Active	
PL 2431	Laureate Epsilon Kappa		The Villages, Florida	FL	Active	
PL 2436	Laureate Beta Delta		Sierra Vista, Arizona	AZ	Active	
PL 2437	Laureate Epsilon Mu		Clearwater, Florida	FL	Active	
PL 2439	Laureate Beta Epsilon		Kingman, Arizona	AZ	Active	
PL 2443	Laureate Alpha Iota		Little Rock, Arkansas	AR	Active	
PL 2448	Laureate Delta Eta		Massillon, Ohio	OH	Active	
PL 2452	Laureate Epsilon Nu		St. Petersburg, Florida	FL	Active	
PL 2455	Laureate Epsilon Xi		Melbourne, Florida	FL	Active	
PL 2458	Laureate Beta Nu		Lawrenceburg, Indiana	IN	Active	
PL 2462	Laureate Zeta Epsilon		Berwick, Pennsylvania	PA	Active	
PL 2474	Laureate Alpha Theta		Binghamton, New York	NY	Active	
PL 2476	Laureate Gamma Omicron		Lena, Illinois	IL	Active	
PL 2477	Laureate Zeta		Barnstable, Massachusetts	MA	Active	
PL 2479	Laureate Tau		Henderson, Nevada	NV	Active	
PL 2485	Laureate Gamma Omicron		Chehalis, Washington	WA	Active	
PL 2486	Laureate Mu		Oxford, Nova Scotia, Canada	NS	Active	
PL 2494	Laureate Theta Delta		Mercedes, Texas	TX	Active	
PL 2497	Laureate Theta Epsilon		Port Lavaca, Texas	TX	Active	
PL 2508	Laureate Gamma Beta		Victoria, British Columbia, Canada	BC	Active	
PL 2510	Laureate Delta Mu		Cincinnati, Ohio	OH	Active	
PL 2511	Laureate Xi		Groton, Connecticut	CT	Active	
PL 2512	Laureate Beta Omega		Kelowna, British Columbia, Canada	BC	Active	
PL 2513	Laureate Delta Lambda		Kitchener, Ontario, Canada	ON	Active	
PL 2517	Laureate Delta Iota		Manchester, Missouri	MO	Active	
PL 2518	Laureate Theta Eta		Livingston, Texas	TX	Active	
PL 2519	Laureate Beta		Charlottetown, Prince Edward Island, Canada	PE	Active	
PL 2524	Laureate Iota Mu		Santa Cruz, California	CA	Active	
PL 2532	Laureate Gamma Alpha		Kelowna, British Columbia, Canada	BC	Active	
PL 2536	Laureate Delta Nu		Guelph, Ontario, Canada	ON	Active	
PL 2539	Laureate Beta Pi		Linton, Indiana	IN	Active	
PL 2543	Laureate Alpha Eta		Bellevue, Nebraska	NE	Active	
PL 2544	Laureate Theta Mu		Humble, Texas	TX	Active	
PL 2545	Laureate Gamma Delta		Oskaloosa, Iowa	IA	Active	
PL 2547	Laureate Delta Xi		Warren, Ohio	OH	Active	
PL 2556	Laureate Gamma Rho		Peoria, Illinois	IL	Active	
PL 2557	Laureate Gamma Delta		Nanaimo, British Columbia, Canada	BC	Active	
PL 2558	Laureate Gamma Epsilon		Salmon Arm, British Columbia, Canada	BC	Active	
PL 2559	Laureate Alpha Zeta		Memphis, Tennessee	TN	Active	
PL 2566	Laureate Iota Omicron		El Centro, California	CA	Active	
PL 2570	Laureate Theta Nu		Universal City, Texas	TX	Active	
PL 2572	Laureate Gamma Sigma		Elgin, Illinois	IL	Active	
PL 2573	Laureate Gamma Zeta		Campbell River, British Columbia, Canada	BC	Active	
PL 2586	Laureate Iota Rho		Palm Desert, California	CA	Active	
PL 2589	Laureate Epsilon Chi		West DeLand, Florida	FL	Active	
PL 2590	Laureate Sigma		Lloydminster, Saskatchewan, Canada	SK	Active	
PL 2594	Laureate Iota Sigma		Vallejo, California	CA	Active	
PL 2596	Laureate Beta Beta		Hampton, Virginia	VA	Active	
PL 2597	Laureate Rho		Whitesburg, Kentucky	KY	Active	
PL 2602	Laureate Delta Nu		Bolivar, Missouri	MO	Active	
PL 2603	Laureate Rho		Jasper, Alabama	AL	Active	
PL 2605	Laureate Delta Rho		Peterborough, Ontario, Canada	ON	Active	
PL 2606	Laureate Alpha Epsilon		Bonners Ferry, Idaho	ID	Active	
PL 2607	Laureate Delta Omicron		Kennett, Missouri	MO	Active	
PL 2609	Laureate Gamma Zeta		Pella, Iowa	IA	Active	
PL 2610	Laureate Epsilon Omega		Bradenton, Florida	FL	Active	
PL 2612	Laureate Beta Alpha		Stayton, Oregon	OR	Active	
PL 2615	Laureate Zeta Alpha		Orange Park, Florida	FL	Active	
PL 2617	Laureate Beta Gamma		Woodbridge, Virginia	VA	Active	
PL 2620	Laureate Delta Pi		Kansas City, Missouri	MO	Active	
PL 2621	Laureate Beta Kappa		Camp Verde, Arizona	AZ	Active	
PL 2632	Laureate Upsilon		Slidell, Louisiana	LA	Active	
PL 2636	Laureate Iota Phi		Bakersfield, California	CA	Active	
PL 2637	Laureate Rho		Bangor, Maine	ME	Active	
PL 2638	Laureate Gamma Theta		Smithers, British Columbia, Canada	BC	Active	
PL 2643	Laureate Beta Delta		Pilot Rock, Oregon	OR	Active	
PL 2647	Laureate Alpha Iota		Niagara Falls, New York	NY	Active	
PL 2650	Laureate Beta Psi		Detroit, Michigan	MI	Active	
PL 2654	Laureate Chi		Natchitoches, Louisiana	LA	Active	
PL 2659	Laureate Gamma Upsilon		Aledo, Illinois	IL	Active	
PL 2663	Laureate Rho		Greenville, South Carolina	SC	Active	
PL 2665	Laureate Beta Epsilon		Newport, Oregon	OR	Active	
PL 2668	Laureate Theta Omicron		Henderson, Texas	TX	Active	
PL 2669	Laureate Delta Rho		Gallatin, Missouri	MO	Active	
PL 2670	Laureate Alpha Delta		Marietta, Georgia	GA	Active	
PL 2679	Laureate Phi		High River, Alberta, Canada	AB	Active	
PL 2683	Laureate Delta Chi		South Point, Ohio	OH	Active	
PL 2684	Laureate Theta Rho		Midland, Texas	TX	Active	
PL 2685	Laureate Chi		Las Vegas, Nevada	NV	Active	
PL 2686	Laureate Zeta		Newark, Delaware	DE	Active	
PL 2690	Laureate Iota Chi		Riverside, California	CA	Active	
PL 2696	Laureate Beta Kappa		Harrisonburg, Virginia	VA	Active	
PL 2697	Laureate Lambda		Devils Lake, North Dakota	ND	Active	
PL 2698	Laureate Alpha Zeta		Hickory, North Carolina	NC	Active	
PL 2699	Laureate Beta Iota		Arvada, Colorado	CO	Active	
PL 2703	Laureate Iota Omega		Lake Isabella, California	CA	Active	
PL 2705	Laureate Sigma		Owensboro, Kentucky	KY	Active	
PL 2706	Laureate Gamma Tau		Renton, Washington	WA	Active	
PL 2707	Laureate Alpha Pi		Hooker, Oklahoma	OK	Active	
PL 2717	Laureate Beta Zeta		Lebanon, Oregon	OR	Active	
PL 2718	Laureate Alpha Mu		Glens Falls, New York	NY	Active	
PL 2720	Laureate Beta Upsilon		Mission, Kansas	KS	Active	
PL 2723	Laureate Delta Omega		Akron, Ohio	OH	Active	
PL 2727	Laureate Delta Phi		Brockville, Ontario, Canada	ON	Active	
PL 2728	Laureate Gamma Phi		Vancouver, Washington	WA	Active	
PL 2739	Laureate Alpha Xi		Wellsville, New York	NY	Active	
PL 2741	Laureate Gamma Iota		Comox, British Columbia, Canada	BC	Active	
PL 2742	Laureate Theta Sigma		Canyon Lake, Texas	TX	Active	
PL 2743	Laureate Delta Omega		Archie, Missouri	MO	Active	
PL 2750	Laureate Theta Tau		Euless, Texas	TX	Active	
PL 2753	Laureate Delta Psi		Kingston, Ontario, Canada	ON	Active	
PL 2754	Laureate Beta Chi		Indianapolis, Indiana	IN	Active	
PL 2757	Laureate Beta Chi		Wichita, Kansas	KS	Active	
PL 2760	Laureate Delta Omega		Gravenhurst, Ontario, Canada	ON	Active	
PL 2762	Laureate Zeta Kappa		Allentown, Pennsylvania	PA	Active	
PL 2763	Laureate Epsilon Gamma		Cincinnati, Ohio	OH	Active	
PL 2764	Laureate Epsilon Alpha		Salisbury, Missouri	MO	Active	
PL 2766	Laureate Gamma Theta		Ames, Iowa	IA	Active	
PL 2770	Laureate Chi		Calgary, Alberta, Canada	AB	Active	
PL 2771	Laureate Gamma Psi		Bloomington, Illinois	IL	Active	
PL 2774	Laureate Gamma Iota		Davenport, Iowa	IA	Active	
PL 2775	Laureate Gamma Lambda		Richmond, British Columbia, Canada	BC	Active	
PL 2778	Laureate Epsilon Beta		Webb City, Missouri	MO	Active	
PL 2785	Laureate Beta Psi		South Bend, Indiana	IN	Active	
PL 2786	Laureate Delta Beta		Dove Creek, Colorado	CO	Active	
PL 2789	Laureate Pi		Red Lodge, Montana	MT	Active	
PL 2790	Laureate Alpha Iota		Shelby, North Carolina	NC	Active	
PL 2793	Laureate Zeta Lambda		Stroudsburg, Pennsylvania	PA	Active	
PL 2796	Laureate Gamma Xi		Abbotsford, British Columbia, Canada	BC	Active	
PL 2798	Laureate Zeta Theta		Palm Coast, Florida	FL	Active	
PL 2801	Laureate Gamma Omicron		Cranbrook, British Columbia, Canada	BC	Active	
PL 2803	Laureate Upsilon		Saskatoon, Saskatchewan, Canada	SK	Active	
PL 2805	Laureate Alpha Xi		Charleston, West Virginia	WV	Active	
PL 2806	Laureate Beta Delta		Roanoke, Virginia	VA	Active	
PL 2807	Laureate Alpha Pi		Albuquerque, New Mexico	NM	Active	
PL 2808	Laureate Alpha Beta		Chippewa Falls, Wisconsin	WI	Active	
PL 2809	Laureate Phi		Saskatoon, Saskatchewan, Canada	SK	Active	
PL 2810	Laureate Alpha Nu		Rogers, Arkansas	AR	Active	
PL 2816	Laureate Epsilon Beta		London, Ontario, Canada	ON	Active	
PL 2818	Laureate Alpha Tau		Shawnee, Oklahoma	OK	Active	
PL 2821	Laureate Zeta Iota		Boca Raton, Florida	FL	Active	
PL 2828	Laureate Alpha Kappa		Carolina Beach, North Carolina	NC	Active	
PL 2831	Laureate Gamma Epsilon		Bloomfield, Michigan	MI	Active	
PL 2832	Laureate Theta Omega		Dallas, Texas	TX	Active	
PL 2834	Laureate Epsilon Gamma		Ottawa, Ontario, Canada	ON	Active	
PL 2837	Laureate Epsilon Delta		Stratford, Ontario, Canada	ON	Active	
PL 2841	Laureate Beta Tau		Phoenix, Arizona	AZ	Active	
PL 2843	Laureate Alpha Xi		Mountain Home, Arkansas	AR	Active	
PL 2844	Laureate Alpha Lambda		Bellevue, Nebraska	NE	Active	
PL 2847	Laureate Upsilon		Owensboro, Kentucky	KY	Active	
PL 2850	Laureate Alpha Lambda		Raleigh, North Carolina	NC	Active	
PL 2860	Laureate Rho		Billings, Montana	MT	Active	
PL 2862	Laureate Delta Beta		Aurora, Illinois	IL	Active	
PL 2864	Laureate Gamma Chi		Port Orchard, Washington	WA	Active	
PL 2866	Laureate Omega		Ruston, Louisiana	LA	Active	
PL 2872	Laureate Iota Beta		Plano, Texas	TX	Active	
PL 2873	Laureate Iota Gamma		Granbury, Texas	TX	Active	
PL 2876	Laureate Tau		Portland, Maine	ME	Active	
PL 2878	Laureate Beta Upsilon		Tucson, Arizona	AZ	Active	
PL 2880	Laureate Upsilon		North Myrtle Beach, South Carolina	SC	Active	
PL 2881	Laureate Alpha Mu		Hendersonville, North Carolina	NC	Active	
PL 2887	Laureate Epsilon Zeta		Marion, Ohio	OH	Active	
PL 2888	Laureate Iota Epsilon		Richardson, Texas	TX	Active	
PL 2891	Laureate Epsilon Theta		Massillon, Ohio	OH	Active	
PL 2892	Laureate Epsilon Zeta		Oshawa, Ontario, Canada	ON	Active	
PL 2893	Laureate Alpha Alpha		Cumberland, Maryland	MD	Active	
PL 2894	Laureate Pi		Park City, Utah	UT	Active	
PL 2895	Laureate Gamma Theta		Niles, Michigan	MI	Active	
PL 2896	Laureate Epsilon Theta		Belleville, Ontario, Canada	ON	Active	
PL 2897	Laureate Alpha Alpha		Las Vegas, Nevada	NV	Active	
PL 2899	Laureate Iota Zeta		Plano, Texas	TX	Active	
PL 2900	Laureate Zeta Pi		Harrisburg, Pennsylvania	PA	Active	
PL 2901	Laureate Gamma Psi		Olympia, Washington	WA	Active	
PL 2903	Laureate Iota Kappa		Round Rock, Texas	TX	Active	
PL 2906	Laureate Epsilon Eta		Buffalo, Missouri	MO	Active	
PL 2913	Laureate Psi		Upton, Wyoming	WY	Active	
PL 2916	Laureate Delta Beta		Bryan, Ohio	OH	Active	
PL 2918	Laureate Epsilon Theta		Kirksville, Missouri	MO	Active	
PL 2920	Laureate Tau		Troy, Alabama	AL	Active	
PL 2924	Laureate Omega		Calgary, Alberta, Canada	AB	Active	
PL 2927	Laureate Zeta		Sutherland, New South Wales, Australia	NSW	Active	
PL 2929	Laureate Epsilon Kappa		Steubenville, Ohio	OH	Active	
PL 2930	Laureate Alpha Alpha		Red Deer, Alberta, Canada	AB	Active	
PL 2931	Laureate Pi		Rochester, Minnesota	MN	Active	
PL 2935	Laureate Gamma Xi		Clear Lake, Iowa	IA	Active	
PL 2936	Laureate Alpha Sigma		Albuquerque, New Mexico	NM	Active	
PL 2941	Laureate Beta Theta		Corvallis, Oregon	OR	Active	
PL 2944	Laureate Iota Lambda		Gainesville, Texas	TX	Active	
PL 2946	Laureate Alpha Beta		Edmonton, Alberta, Canada	AB	Active	
PL 2948	Laureate Chi		Regina, Saskatchewan, Canada	SK	Active	
PL 2951	Laureate Iota Nu		Amarillo, Texas	TX	Active	
PL 2952	Laureate Epsilon Lambda		Moberly, Missouri	MO	Active	
PL 2955	Laureate Phi		Rapid City, South Dakota	SD	Active	
PL 2956	Laureate Alpha Gamma		Calgary, Alberta, Canada	AB	Active	
PL 2959	Laureate Alpha Delta		Merrill, Wisconsin	WI	Active	
PL 2961	Laureate Gamma Phi		Kamloops, British Columbia, Canada	BC	Active	
PL 2965	Laureate Epsilon Kappa		Orillia, Ontario, Canada	ON	Active	
PL 2966	Laureate Alpha Omega		Conway, Arkansas	AR	Active	
PL 2969	Laureate Beta Iota		Salem, Oregon	OR	Active	
PL 2970	Laureate Iota Pi		Burleson, Texas	TX	Active	
PL 2971	Laureate Chi		Pierre, South Dakota	SD	Active	
PL 2972	Laureate Zeta Omicron		The Villages, Florida	FL	Active	
PL 2976	Laureate Gamma Delta		Topeka, Kansas	KS	Active	
PL 2978	Laureate Gamma Kappa		Hudson, Michigan	MI	Active	
PL 2980	Laureate Rho		Minneapolis, Minnesota	MN	Active	
PL 2982	Laureate Gamma Pi		Oskaloosa, Iowa	IA	Active	
PL 2984	Laureate Alpha Delta		Rockville, Maryland	MD	Active	
PL 2986	Laureate Alpha Alpha		Baton Rouge, Louisiana	LA	Active	
PL 2987	Laureate Epsilon Nu		Lee's Summit, Missouri	MO	Active	
PL 2990	Laureate Gamma Epsilon		Fort Wayne, Indiana	IN	Active	
PL 2993	Laureate Epsilon Omicron		Joplin, Missouri	MO	Active	
PL 2997	Laureate Beta Psi		Yuma, Arizona	AZ	Active	
PL 3001	Laureate Alpha Psi		Tulsa, Oklahoma	OK	Active	
PL 3004	Laureate Zeta Rho		Deerfield Beach, Florida	FL	Active	
PL 3009	Laureate Beta Mu		Hotchkiss, Colorado	CO	Active	
PL 3011	Laureate Gamma Zeta		Waterville, Kansas	KS	Active	
PL 3012	Laureate Alpha Delta		St. Albert, Alberta, Canada	AB	Active	
PL 3013	Laureate Iota Rho		Jacksonville, Texas	TX	Active	
PL 3014	Laureate Gamma Psi		Merritt, British Columbia, Canada	BC	Active	
PL 3021	Laureate Alpha Kappa		Crossville, Tennessee	TN	Active	
PL 3022	Laureate Alpha Omega		Chickasha, Oklahoma	OK	Active	
PL 3024	Laureate Beta Lambda		Martinsville, Virginia	VA	Active	
PL 3026	Laureate Gamma Omega		Vernon, British Columbia, Canada	BC	Active	
PL 3027	Laureate Gamma Theta		Wichita, Kansas	KS	Active	
PL 3032	Laureate Epsilon Pi		Independence, Missouri	MO	Active	
PL 3033	Laureate Alpha Upsilon		Las Cruces, New Mexico	NM	Active	
PL 3035	Laureate Gamma Rho		Des Moines, Iowa	IA	Active	
PL 3038	Laureate Alpha Rho		Parkersburg, West Virginia	WV	Active	
PL 3039	Laureate Alpha Delta		Ville Platte, Louisiana	LA	Active	
PL 3046	Laureate Epsilon Nu		Port Elgin, Ontario, Canada	ON	Active	
PL 3047	Laureate Alpha Lambda		Bristol, Tennessee	TN	Active	
PL 3050	Laureate Gamma Eta		Terre Haute, Indiana	IN	Active	
PL 3053	Laureate Epsilon Tau		Oshawa, Ontario, Canada	ON	Active	
PL 3054	Laureate Alpha Kappa		Peachtree City, Georgia	GA	Active	
PL 3055	Laureate Beta Omega		Glendale, Arizona	AZ	Active	
PL 3057	Laureate Zeta Upsilon		Jacksonville, Florida	FL	Active	
PL 3060	Laureate Gamma Lambda		Sturgis, Michigan	MI	Active	
PL 3062	Laureate Kappa Tau		Richmond, California	CA	Active	
PL 3063	Laureate Phi		Ashland, Kentucky	KY	Active	
PL 3068	Laureate Zeta Phi		Pensacola, Florida	FL	Active	
PL 3073	Laureate Epsilon Pi		Wasaga Beach, Ontario, Canada	ON	Active	
PL 3074	Laureate Alpha Xi		Danville, Pennsylvania	PA	Active	
PL 3075	Laureate Epsilon Rho		Oshawa, Ontario, Canada	ON	Active	
PL 3076	Laureate Kappa Omega		Pacifica, California	CA	Active	
PL 3078	Laureate Gamma Nu		Grand Rapids, Michigan	MI	Active	
PL 3079	Laureate Zeta Chi		Winter Haven, Florida	FL	Active	
PL 3082	Laureate Gamma Alpha		Casa Grande, Arizona	AZ	Active	
PL 3086	Laureate Gamma Sigma		Council Bluffs, Iowa	IA	Active	
PL 3092	Laureate Iota Sigma		Glen Rose, Texas	TX	Active	
PL 3096	Laureate Omega		Regina, Saskatchewan, Canada	SK	Active	
PL 3097	Laureate Alpha Mu		Tracy City, Tennessee	TN	Active	
PL 3098	Laureate Beta Rho		Colonial Heights, Virginia	VA	Active	
PL 3099	Laureate Iota Tau		Katy, Texas	TX	Active	
PL 3100	Laureate Alpha Omicron		Calabash, North Carolina	NC	Active	
PL 3102	Laureate Epsilon Upsilon		Belton, Missouri	MO	Active	
PL 3106	Laureate Zeta Psi		Ocala, Florida	FL	Active	
PL 3109	Laureate Psi		Rapid City, South Dakota	SD	Active	
PL 3110	Laureate Eta Alpha		Miami, Florida	FL	Active	
PL 3111	Laureate Lambda Delta		Vacaville, California	CA	Active	
PL 3115	Laureate Alpha Zeta		Jerome, Idaho	ID	Active	
PL 3117	Laureate Delta Eta		Mission, British Columbia, Canada	BC	Active	
PL 3118	Laureate Gamma Lambda		Topeka, Kansas	KS	Active	
PL 3120	Laureate Alpha Delta		Portland, Oregon	OR	Active	
PL 3121	Laureate Upsilon		Torrington, Connecticut	CT	Active	
PL 3124	Laureate Gamma Beta		Tempe, Arizona	AZ	Active	
PL 3127	Laureate Delta Eta		Champaign, Illinois	IL	Active	
PL 3129	Laureate Alpha Nu		Smyrna, Tennessee	TN	Active	
PL 3130	Laureate Eta		Newark, Delaware	DE	Active	
PL 3131	Laureate Eta Delta		Orlando, Florida	FL	Active	
PL 3132	Laureate Alpha Pi		Salisbury, North Carolina	NC	Active	
PL 3133	Laureate Epsilon Nu		Castalia, Ohio	OH	Active	
PL 3134	Laureate Eta Epsilon		Tampa, Florida	FL	Active	
PL 3135	Laureate Gamma Mu		Wamego, Kansas	KS	Active	
PL 3136	Laureate Mu		Fargo, North Dakota	ND	Active	
PL 3137	Laureate Beta Upsilon		Roanoke, Virginia	VA	Active	
PL 3138	Laureate Eta Zeta		Bradenton, Florida	FL	Active	
PL 3139	Laureate Tau		Burnsville, Minnesota	MN	Active	
PL 3140	Laureate Eta Eta		Tallahassee, Florida	FL	Active	
PL 3144	Laureate Alpha Xi		Cleveland, Tennessee	TN	Active	
PL 3147	Laureate Gamma Gamma		Tucson, Arizona	AZ	Active	
PL 3150	Laureate Alpha Sigma		Parkersburg, West Virginia	WV	Active	
PL 3152	Laureate Alpha Eta		Hartland, Wisconsin	WI	Active	
PL 3153	Laureate Delta Iota		Qualicum Beach, British Columbia, Canada	BC	Active	
PL 3154	Laureate Alpha Omicron		Jersey Shore, Pennsylvania	PA	Active	
PL 3157	Laureate Lambda Epsilon		Manteca, California	CA	Active	
PL 3159	Laureate Gamma Epsilon		Sun Lakes, Arizona	AZ	Active	
PL 3160	Laureate Omega		Encampment, Wyoming	WY	Active	
PL 3161	Laureate Beta Gamma		Tinker Air Force Base, Oklahoma City, Oklahoma	OK	Active	
PL 3162	Laureate Eta Iota		Orlando, Florida	FL	Active	
PL 3163	Laureate Epsilon Xi		Brunswick, Ohio	OH	Active	
PL 3164	Laureate Iota Phi		Euless, Texas	TX	Active	
PL 3165	Laureate Gamma Nu		Olathe, Kansas	KS	Active	
PL 3168	Laureate Gamma Omicron		Gaylord, Michigan	MI	Active	
PL 3169	Laureate Lambda Zeta		San Mateo, California	CA	Active	
PL 3171	Laureate Upsilon		Werribee, Victoria, Australia	VIC	Active	
PL 3172	Laureate Eta Kappa		Daytona Beach, Florida	FL	Active	
PL 3174	Laureate Epsilon Chi		Belton, Missouri	MO	Active	
PL 3176	Laureate Alpha Rho		Havelock, North Carolina	NC	Active	
PL 3177	Laureate Epsilon Omicron		Massillon, Ohio	OH	Active	
PL 3178	Laureate Alpha Xi		Nebraska City, Nebraska	NE	Active	
PL 3179	Laureate Alpha Sigma		Raleigh, North Carolina	NC	Active	
PL 3180	Laureate Iota Psi		Houston, Texas	TX	Active	
PL 3181	Laureate Gamma Zeta		Chandler, Arizona	AZ	Active	
PL 3182	Laureate Psi		Hampton, South Carolina	SC	Active	
PL 3185	Laureate Gamma Xi		Wichita, Kansas	KS	Active	
PL 3186	Laureate Epsilon Psi		Trenton, Ontario, Canada	ON	Active	
PL 3189	Laureate Rho		Camden, New Jersey	NJ	Active	
PL 3190	Laureate Delta Kappa		Port Alberni, British Columbia, Canada	BC	Active	
PL 3191	Laureate Beta Alpha		Albuquerque, New Mexico	NM	Active	
PL 3192	Laureate Alpha Rho		Nashville, Tennessee	TN	Active	
PL 3193	Laureate Epsilon Psi		Lake Winnebago, Missouri	MO	Active	
PL 3194	Laureate Iota Omega		Houston, Texas	TX	Active	
PL 3196	Laureate Alpha Tau		Havelock, North Carolina	NC	Active	
PL 3197	Laureate Beta Alpha		Pocahontas, Arkansas	AR	Active	
PL 3198	Laureate Gamma Mu		Peoria, Arizona	AZ	Active	
PL 3199	Laureate Epsilon Omega		Ballwin, Missouri	MO	Active	
PL 3200	Laureate Gamma Rho		Adrian, Michigan	MI	Active	
PL 3201	Laureate Delta Lambda		Campbell River, British Columbia, Canada	BC	Active	
PL 3202	Laureate Beta Phi		Williamsburg, Virginia	VA	Active	
PL 3203	Laureate Alpha Omicron		Omaha, Nebraska	NE	Active	
PL 3204	Laureate Gamma Sigma		Detroit, Michigan	MI	Active	
PL 3206	Laureate Kappa Alpha		Amarillo, Texas	TX	Active	
PL 3207	Laureate Delta Mu		Richmond, British Columbia, Canada	BC	Active	
PL 3209	Laureate Delta Theta		Springfield, Illinois	IL	Active	
PL 3210	Laureate Eta Nu		Clermont, Florida	FL	Active	
PL 3211	Laureate Gamma Iota		Noblesville, Indiana	IN	Active	
PL 3212	Laureate Zeta Alpha		Independence, Missouri	MO	Active	

=== Master chapters ===
Following are the active Master chapters of Beta Sigma Phi as of 2026.

Number	Chapter	Charter date and range	Location	State or province	Status	Ref.
MA 100	Alpha Master		Kansas City, Missouri	MO	Active	
MA 101	Alpha Master		Abilene, Kansas	KS	Active	
MA 103	Alpha Master		Lancaster, Pennsylvania	PA	Active	
MA 104	Alpha Master		Riverside, California	CA	Active	
MA 107	Alpha Master		Beckley, West Virginia	WV	Active	
MA 109	Alpha Master		Lima, Ohio	OH	Active	
MA 113	Alpha Master		Council Bluffs, Iowa	IA	Active	
MA 116	Alpha Master		Ottawa, Ontario, Canada	ON	Active	
MA 119	Alpha Master		Boise, Idaho	ID	Active	
MA 120	Alpha Master		Albuquerque, New Mexico	NM	Active	
MA 123	Alpha Master		Rome, Georgia	GA	Active	
MA 128	Gamma Master		Brantford, Ontario, Canada	ON	Active	
MA 129	Alpha Master		Salem, Oregon	OR	Active	
MA 131	Beta Master		Everett, Washington	WA	Active	
MA 132	Beta Master		Decorah, Iowa	IA	Active	
MA 135	Alpha Master		Gardnerville, Nevada	NV	Active	
MA 145	Alpha Master		Biloxi, Mississippi	MS	Active	
MA 146	Alpha Master		Sioux Falls, South Dakota	SD	Active	
MA 147	Beta Master		Springfield, Illinois	IL	Active	
MA 149	Beta Master		Pine Bluff, Arkansas	AR	Active	
MA 150	Alpha Master		Waynesville, North Carolina	NC	Active	
MA 152	Beta Master		Daytona Beach, Florida	FL	Active	
MA 156	Gamma Master		Pontiac, Michigan	MI	Active	
MA 160	Gamma Master		Leavenworth, Kansas	KS	Active	
MA 171	Beta Master		Wilmington, Ohio	OH	Active	
MA 172	Delta Master		Salina, Kansas	KS	Active	
MA 173	Gamma Master		Independence, Missouri	MO	Active	
MA 178	Delta Master		Toronto, Canada	ON	Active	
MA 179	Gamma Master		Vero Beach, Florida	FL	Active	
MA 181	Delta Master		Excelsior Springs, Missouri	MO	Active	
MA 182	Alpha Master		Springfield, Massachusetts	MA	Active	
MA 183	Alpha Master		New Orleans, Louisiana	LA	Active	
MA 185	Alpha Master		Victoria, British Columbia, Canada	BC	Active	
MA 187	Beta Master		Lafayette, Indiana	IN	Active	
MA 188	Delta Master		Houston, Texas	TX	Active	
MA 192	Delta Master		Raymond, Washington	WA	Active	
MA 198	Gamma Master		Anderson, Indiana	IN	Active	
MA 201	Beta Master		Calgary, Alberta, Canada	AB	Active	
MA 204	Beta Master		Boulder City, Nevada	NV	Active	
MA 208	Gamma Master		Klamath Falls, Oregon	OR	Active	
MA 209	Alpha Master		Charlottetown, Prince Edward Island, Canada	PE	Active	
MA 211	Alpha Master		New Brunswick, New Jersey	NJ	Active	
MA 213	Epsilon Master		New Haven, Connecticut	CT	Active	
MA 215	Epsilon Master		North Kansas City, Missouri	MO	Active	
MA 219	Gamma Master		Huntington, West Virginia	WV	Active	
MA 220	Theta Master		Houston, Texas	TX	Active	
MA 223	Delta Master		Mansfield, Ohio	OH	Active	
MA 224	Zeta Master		Anderson, Indiana	IN	Active	
MA 226	Zeta Master		Warren, Ohio	OH	Active	
MA 229	Beta Master		Deadwood, South Dakota	SD	Active	
MA 237	Gamma Master		Bismarck, North Dakota	ND	Active	
MA 238	Iota Master		New Braunfels, Texas	TX	Active	
MA 239	Pi Master		Hayward, California	CA	Active	
MA 243	Gamma Master		Reno, Nevada	NV	Active	
MA 247	Kappa Master		Richland, Washington	WA	Active	
MA 248	Lambda Master		Tacoma, Washington	WA	Active	
MA 255	Epsilon Master		Crestview, Florida	FL	Active	
MA 256	Alpha Master		Birmingham, Alabama	AL	Active	
MA 257	Epsilon Master		Lawrence, Kansas	KS	Active	
MA 259	Zeta Master		Carlisle, Pennsylvania	PA	Active	
MA 263	Alpha Master		Buffalo, New York	NY	Active	
MA 264	Iota Master		St. Thomas, Ontario, Canada	ON	Active	
MA 267	Epsilon Master		Roseburg, Oregon	OR	Active	
MA 268	Eta Master		Marshall, Missouri	MO	Active	
MA 269	Upsilon Master		Petaluma, California	CA	Active	
MA 281	Gamma Master		Tempe, Arizona	AZ	Active	
MA 283	Lambda Master		Harrisburg, Illinois	IL	Active	
MA 284	Zeta Master		Lakeland, Florida	FL	Active	
MA 286	Nu Master		Walla Walla, Washington	WA	Active	
MA 290	Eta Master		Beaverton, Oregon	OR	Active	
MA 291	Mu Master		Kitchener, Ontario, Canada	ON	Active	
MA 292	Chi Master		Fullerton, California	CA	Active	
MA 293	Delta Master		Roanoke, Virginia	VA	Active	
MA 294	Psi Master		Carlsbad, California	CA	Active	
MA 295	Alpha Master		Lexington, Kentucky	KY	Active	
MA 296	Omega Master		Stockton, California	CA	Active	
MA 299	Omicron Master		Seattle, Washington	WA	Active	
MA 300	Delta Master		Weirton, West Virginia	WV	Active	
MA 301	Eta Master		Bethlehem, Pennsylvania	PA	Active	
MA 309	Eta Master		Terre Haute, Indiana	IN	Active	
MA 314	Omicron Master		Burlington, Ontario, Canada	ON	Active	
MA 318	Gamma Master		Victoria, British Columbia, Canada	BC	Active	
MA 319	Beta Master		Saskatoon, Saskatchewan, Canada	SK	Active	
MA 325	Rho Master		Odessa, Texas	TX	Active	
MA 326	Kappa Master		Lamar, Colorado	CO	Active	
MA 329	Alpha Alpha Master		Whittier, California	CA	Active	
MA 330	Rho Master		Sarnia, Ontario, Canada	ON	Active	
MA 332	Sigma Master		Stephenville, Texas	TX	Active	
MA 340	Epsilon Master		Alexandria, Virginia	VA	Active	
MA 349	Zeta Master		Mesa, Arizona	AZ	Active	
MA 350	Delta Master		North Vancouver, British Columbia, Canada	BC	Active	
MA 355	Alpha Master		St. John's, Newfoundland and Labrador, Canada	NL	Active	
MA 358	Gamma Master		Vineland, New Jersey	NJ	Active	
MA 359	Alpha Epsilon Master		Visalia, California	CA	Active	
MA 360	Epsilon Master		Nevada, Iowa	IA	Active	
MA 362	Kappa Master		Xenia, Ohio	OH	Active	
MA 366	Iota Master		Detroit, Michigan	MI	Active	
MA 367	Beta Master		Milwaukee, Wisconsin	WI	Active	
MA 370	Lambda Master		Fort Collins, Colorado	CO	Active	
MA 374	Kappa Master		Bay City, Michigan	MI	Active	
MA 379	Lambda Master		Tampa, Florida	FL	Active	
MA 381	Epsilon Master		Vancouver, British Columbia, Canada	BC	Active	
MA 382	Nu Master		Centralia, Illinois	IL	Active	
MA 389	Theta Master		Great Bend, Kansas	KS	Active	
MA 391	Omega Master		Houston, Texas	TX	Active	
MA 393	Nu Master		Cambridge, Ohio	OH	Active	
MA 396	Mu Master		Orlando, Florida	FL	Active	
MA 398	Kappa Master		Kokomo, Indiana	IN	Active	
MA 401	Theta Master		Farmington, New Mexico	NM	Active	
MA 402	Lambda Master		Coldwater, Michigan	MI	Active	
MA 411	Eta Master		Red Deer, Alberta, Canada	AB	Active	
MA 413	Delta Master		Hot Springs, Arkansas	AR	Active	
MA 420	Xi Master		Cocoa, Florida	FL	Active	
MA 427	Mu Master		Pendleton, Oregon	OR	Active	
MA 429	Alpha Mu Master		Fair Oaks, California	CA	Active	
MA 431	Alpha Beta Master		Abilene, Texas	TX	Active	
MA 436	Epsilon Master		Caldwell, Idaho	ID	Active	
MA 437	Delta Master		Bridgeton, New Jersey	NJ	Active	
MA 445	Gamma Master		Winston-Salem, North Carolina	NC	Active	
MA 447	Gamma Master		Yorkton, Saskatchewan, Canada	SK	Active	
MA 448	Eta Master		Vancouver, British Columbia, Canada	BC	Active	
MA 451	Alpha Delta Master		Carthage, Texas	TX	Active	
MA 452	Alpha Epsilon Master		Wichita Falls, Texas	TX	Active	
MA 453	Sigma Master		Cincinnati, Ohio	OH	Active	
MA 459	Tau Master		Tacoma, Washington	WA	Active	
MA 465	Chi Master		London, Ontario, Canada	ON	Active	
MA 466	Zeta Master		Oklahoma City, Oklahoma	OK	Active	
MA 467	Alpha Zeta Master		Denton, Texas	TX	Active	
MA 469	Alpha Master		Mackay, Queensland, Australia	QLD	Active	
MA 471	Beta Master		Fredericton, New Brunswick, Canada	NB	Active	
MA 475	Upsilon Master		Lancaster, Ohio	OH	Active	
MA 478	Delta Master		Statesboro, Georgia	GA	Active	
MA 480	Sigma Master		Effingham, Illinois	IL	Active	
MA 482	Nu Master		Moberly, Missouri	MO	Active	
MA 484	Mu Master		Altoona, Pennsylvania	PA	Active	
MA 487	Iota Master		New Westminster, British Columbia, Canada	BC	Active	
MA 488	Kappa Master		Parkersburg, West Virginia	WV	Active	
MA 491	Kappa Master		Nanaimo, British Columbia, Canada	BC	Active	
MA 494	Delta Master		Chadron, Nebraska	NE	Active	
MA 495	Upsilon Master		Richland, Washington	WA	Active	
MA 497	Alpha Iota Master		McGregor, Texas	TX	Active	
MA 500	Psi Master		Thunder Bay, Ontario, Canada	ON	Active	
MA 511	Beta Master		Billings, Montana	MT	Active	
MA 516	Lambda Master		Kansas City, Kansas	KS	Active	
MA 517	Mu Master		Jackson, Michigan	MI	Active	
MA 520	Alpha Mu Master		Baytown, Texas	TX	Active	
MA 521	Alpha Kappa Master		Mount Vernon, Ohio	OH	Active	
MA 523	Omega Master		Mississauga, Ontario, Canada	ON	Active	
MA 524	Alpha Omega Master		Lubbock, Texas	TX	Active	
MA 525	Alpha Pi Master		Stockton, California	CA	Active	
MA 526	Alpha Rho Master		Sunnyvale, California	CA	Active	
MA 529	Theta Master		Dubuque, Iowa	IA	Active	
MA 530	Mu Master		Pratt, Kansas	KS	Active	
MA 531	Alpha Nu Master		Breckenridge, Texas	TX	Active	
MA 532	Alpha Omicron Master		Harlingen, Texas	TX	Active	
MA 537	Theta Master		Luray, Virginia	VA	Active	
MA 538	Beta Master		Truro, Nova Scotia, Canada	NS	Active	
MA 559	Alpha Alpha Master		Belleville, Ontario, Canada	ON	Active	
MA 560	Alpha Master		Hagerstown, Maryland	MD	Active	
MA 564	Iota Master		Los Alamos, New Mexico	NM	Active	
MA 565	Kappa Master		Knoxville, Iowa	IA	Active	
MA 567	Pi Master		Port Huron, Michigan	MI	Active	
MA 571	Mu Master		Kelowna, British Columbia, Canada	BC	Active	
MA 578	Epsilon Master		Augusta, Georgia	GA	Active	
MA 580	Nu Master		Kamloops, British Columbia, Canada	BC	Active	
MA 581	Alpha Sigma Master		Ballinger, Texas	TX	Active	
MA 584	Phi Master		Pensacola, Florida	FL	Active	
MA 586	Sigma Master		Florence, Colorado	CO	Active	
MA 588	Epsilon Master		Buffalo, New York	NY	Active	
MA 591	Xi Master		Pottsville, Pennsylvania	PA	Active	
MA 595	Kappa Master		Clovis, New Mexico	NM	Active	
MA 597	Alpha Gamma Master		Woodstock, Ontario, Canada	ON	Active	
MA 599	Alpha Psi Master		Fremont, California	CA	Active	
MA 600	Omicron Master		Redmond, Oregon	OR	Active	
MA 604	Alpha Alpha Master		Kent, Washington	WA	Active	
MA 606	Gamma Master		Glasgow, Montana	MT	Active	
MA 608	Pi Master		Trenton, Missouri	MO	Active	
MA 609	Rho Master		St. Louis, Missouri	MO	Active	
MA 616	Nu Master		Wichita, Kansas	KS	Active	
MA 620	Alpha Master		Honolulu, Hawaii	HI	Active	
MA 621	Gamma Master		Halifax, Nova Scotia, Canada	NS	Active	
MA 623	Epsilon Master		Manchester, New Hampshire	NH	Active	
MA 624	Tau Master		Jefferson City, Missouri	MO	Active	
MA 625	Omega Master		Mansfield, Ohio	OH	Active	
MA 632	Alpha Zeta Master		London, Ontario, Canada	ON	Active	
MA 634	Alpha Upsilon Master		Fort Worth, Texas	TX	Active	
MA 635	Omicron Master		Connellsville, Pennsylvania	PA	Active	
MA 638	Sigma Master		Lansing, Michigan	MI	Active	
MA 639	Sigma Master		Richmond, British Columbia, Canada	BC	Active	
MA 642	Alpha Nu Master		Findlay, Ohio	OH	Active	
MA 646	Chi Master		Lee's Summit, Missouri	MO	Active	
MA 649	Zeta Master		High Point, North Carolina	NC	Active	
MA 650	Pi Master		Fairfax, Virginia	VA	Active	
MA 654	Alpha Chi Master		Houston, Texas	TX	Active	
MA 656	Omicron Master		Manhattan, Kansas	KS	Active	
MA 658	Omega Master		Eldorado, Illinois	IL	Active	
MA 660	Zeta Master		Superior, Wisconsin	WI	Active	
MA 663	Alpha Psi Master		Port Neches, Texas	TX	Active	
MA 666	Pi Master		Eugene, Oregon	OR	Active	
MA 671	Delta Master		Halifax, Nova Scotia, Canada	NS	Active	
MA 682	Beta Gamma Master		El Paso, Texas	TX	Active	
MA 685	Alpha Sigma Master		Troy, Ohio	OH	Active	
MA 687	Chi Master		Colorado Springs, Colorado	CO	Active	
MA 688	Tau Master		Battle Creek, Michigan	MI	Active	
MA 689	Epsilon Master		Camden, New Jersey	NJ	Active	
MA 691	Alpha Eta Master		Guelph, Ontario, Canada	ON	Active	
MA 699	Beta Delta Master		La Porte, Texas	TX	Active	
MA 706	Epsilon Master		Baton Rouge, Louisiana	LA	Active	
MA 708	Alpha Alpha Master		Lancaster, Ohio	OH	Active	
MA 710	Beta Zeta Master		Denison, Texas	TX	Active	
MA 711	Beta Theta Master		Vacaville, California	CA	Active	
MA 712	Beta Iota Master		Paso Robles, California	CA	Active	
MA 713	Beta Eta Master		Irving, Texas	TX	Active	
MA 716	Alpha Beta Master		Fort Lauderdale, Florida	FL	Active	
MA 717	Zeta Master		Savannah, Georgia	GA	Active	
MA 720	Beta Theta Master		Arlington, Texas	TX	Active	
MA 725	Rho Master		Portland, Oregon	OR	Active	
MA 728	Alpha Beta Master		Lorain, Ohio	OH	Active	
MA 734	Epsilon Master		Grand Forks, North Dakota	ND	Active	
MA 736	Beta Mu Master		Susanville, California	CA	Active	
MA 740	Beta Master		Baltimore, Maryland	MD	Active	
MA 743	Alpha Eta Master		Kent, Washington	WA	Active	
MA 745	Beta Lambda Master		Houston, Texas	TX	Active	
MA 748	Alpha Zeta Master		Kansas City, Missouri	MO	Active	
MA 750	Iota Master		Nampa, Idaho	ID	Active	
MA 751	Kappa Master		Homedale, Idaho	ID	Active	
MA 752	Sigma Master		Toledo, Oregon	OR	Active	
MA 754	Beta Nu Master		Hanford, California	CA	Active	
MA 756	Gamma Master		Bel Air, Maryland	MD	Active	
MA 758	Psi Master		Loveland, Colorado	CO	Active	
MA 760	Alpha Lambda Master		Cobourg, Ontario, Canada	ON	Active	
MA 761	Alpha Alpha Master		Metropolis, Illinois	IL	Active	
MA 763	Alpha Iota Master		Yakima, Washington	WA	Active	
MA 765	Alpha Beta Master		Bloomington, Illinois	IL	Active	
MA 768	Alpha Mu Master		St. Catharines, Ontario, Canada	ON	Active	
MA 770	Alpha Master		Souris, Manitoba, Canada	MB	Active	
MA 771	Beta Nu Master		Waxahachie, Texas	TX	Active	
MA 772	Zeta Master		Tioga, North Dakota	ND	Active	
MA 774	Nu Master		Grants, New Mexico	NM	Active	
MA 776	Alpha Delta Master		Stanberry, Missouri	MO	Active	
MA 777	Beta Xi Master		Houston, Texas	TX	Active	
MA 781	Theta Master		Albany, Georgia	GA	Active	
MA 782	Alpha Gamma Master		Aledo, Illinois	IL	Active	
MA 786	Omega Master		Broomfield, Colorado	CO	Active	
MA 792	Beta Omicron Master		Tustin, California	CA	Active	
MA 793	Upsilon Master		Prince George, British Columbia, Canada	BC	Active	
MA 794	Chi Master		Topeka, Kansas	KS	Active	
MA 795	Theta Master		Syracuse, New York	NY	Active	
MA 797	Delta Master		Adelaide, South Australia, Australia	SA	Active	
MA 798	Epsilon Master		Halifax, Nova Scotia, Canada	NS	Active	
MA 805	Zeta Master		Fayetteville, Arkansas	AR	Active	
MA 806	Alpha Xi Master		Lindsay, Ontario, Canada	ON	Active	
MA 808	Beta Sigma Master		Dallas, Texas	TX	Active	
MA 811	Xi Master		Langley, British Columbia, Canada	BC	Active	
MA 812	Alpha Kappa Master		Tacoma, Washington	WA	Active	
MA 813	Tau Master		Tucson, Arizona	AZ	Active	
MA 815	Beta Pi Master		Santa Barbara, California	CA	Active	
MA 818	Phi Master		Duncan, British Columbia, Canada	BC	Active	
MA 819	Alpha Lambda Master		Auburn, Washington	WA	Active	
MA 821	Beta Tau Master		Houston, Texas	TX	Active	
MA 824	Alpha Alpha Master		Kansas City, Kansas	KS	Active	
MA 829	Alpha Mu Master		Spokane, Washington	WA	Active	
MA 831	Omicron Master		Parkersburg, West Virginia	WV	Active	
MA 832	Lambda Master		Fairbury, Nebraska	NE	Active	
MA 835	Alpha Omicron Master		Aurora, Ontario, Canada	ON	Active	
MA 836	Beta Phi Master		Austin, Texas	TX	Active	
MA 838	Xi Master		Des Moines, Iowa	IA	Active	
MA 840	Lambda Master		Burley, Idaho	ID	Active	
MA 841	Alpha Epsilon Master		Mount Prospect, Illinois	IL	Active	
MA 844	Phi Master		Erie, Pennsylvania	PA	Active	
MA 849	Iota Master		Medina, New York	NY	Active	
MA 852	Alpha Pi Master		Newmarket, Ontario, Canada	ON	Active	
MA 857	Alpha Master		Uddingston, South Lanarkshire, Scotland	Glasgow	Active	
MA 864	Alpha Rho Master		Oshawa, Ontario, Canada	ON	Active	
MA 865	Chi Master		Harrisburg, Pennsylvania	PA	Active	
MA 866	Psi Master		Harrisburg, Pennsylvania	PA	Active	
MA 873	Alpha Psi Master		Columbus, Ohio	OH	Active	
MA 874	Alpha Nu Master		Aberdeen, Washington	WA	Active	
MA 877	Alpha Epsilon Master		Bethany, Missouri	MO	Active	
MA 882	Alpha Sigma Master		Kingston, Ontario, Canada	ON	Active	
MA 885	Gamma Beta Master		Ranger, Texas	TX	Active	
MA 886	Zeta Master		Douglas, Wyoming	WY	Active	
MA 887	Alpha Gamma Master		Whiteland, Indiana	IN	Active	
MA 890	Pi Master		Portales, New Mexico	NM	Active	
MA 891	Alpha Tau Master		Sarnia, Ontario, Canada	ON	Active	
MA 892	Alpha Delta Master		New Albany, Indiana	IN	Active	
MA 893	Iota Master		Fallon, Nevada	NV	Active	
MA 895	Alpha Mu Master		Bradenton, Florida	FL	Active	
MA 897	Alpha Upsilon Master		Ottawa, Ontario, Canada	ON	Active	
MA 898	Gamma Gamma Master		Bryan, Texas	TX	Active	
MA 900	Alpha Chi Master		Markham, Ontario, Canada	ON	Active	
MA 904	Epsilon Master		Adelaide, South Australia, Australia	SA	Active	
MA 910	Kappa Master		Calgary, Alberta, Canada	AB	Active	
MA 914	Alpha Zeta Master		Watseka, Illinois	IL	Active	
MA 916	Pi Master		Morgantown, West Virginia	WV	Active	
MA 921	Gamma Epsilon Master		Silsbee, Texas	TX	Active	
MA 924	Omega Master		Kamloops, British Columbia, Canada	BC	Active	
MA 925	Gamma Master		Saint John, New Brunswick, Canada	NB	Active	
MA 933	Alpha Epsilon Master		Lebanon, Pennsylvania	PA	Active	
MA 934	Alpha Epsilon Master		Aurora, Indiana	IN	Active	
MA 935	Gamma Theta Master		Houston, Texas	TX	Active	
MA 936	Alpha Theta Master		Troy, Illinois	IL	Active	
MA 940	Gamma Iota Master		Galveston, Texas	TX	Active	
MA 941	Alpha Theta Master		Springfield, Missouri	MO	Active	
MA 943	Kappa Master		Stillwater, Oklahoma	OK	Active	
MA 945	Alpha Nu Master		Jacksonville, Florida	FL	Active	
MA 948	Alpha Delta Master		Bowling Green, Ohio	OH	Active	
MA 951	Zeta Master		Brookfield, Nova Scotia, Canada	NS	Active	
MA 953	Gamma Kappa Master		Pasadena, Texas	TX	Active	
MA 959	Alpha Beta Master		Comox, British Columbia, Canada	BC	Active	
MA 960	Alpha Iota Master		Springfield, Illinois	IL	Active	
MA 962	Alpha Eta Master		Erie, Pennsylvania	PA	Active	
MA 963	Beta Omega Master		Gridley, California	CA	Active	
MA 965	Alpha Omicron Master		Belleville, Illinois	IL	Active	
MA 968	Alpha Iota Master		Grand Junction, Colorado	CO	Active	
MA 972	Delta Master		McComb, Mississippi	MS	Active	
MA 974	Alpha Delta Master		Vancouver, British Columbia, Canada	BC	Active	
MA 976	Phi Master		Joseph, Oregon	OR	Active	
MA 977	Gamma Epsilon Master		Eureka, California	CA	Active	
MA 979	Theta Master		Madison, Wisconsin	WI	Active	
MA 980	Gamma Zeta Master		Monterey, California	CA	Active	
MA 982	Alpha Psi Master		Simcoe, Ontario, Canada	ON	Active	
MA 985	Gamma Eta Master		Watsonville, California	CA	Active	
MA 987	Alpha Omega Master		Sudbury, Ontario, Canada	ON	Active	
MA 992	Sigma Master		Marshalltown, Iowa	IA	Active	
MA 995	Sigma Master		Weirton, West Virginia	WV	Active	
MA 1002	Nu Master		Weiser, Idaho	ID	Active	
MA 1008	Alpha Beta Master		Utica, Michigan	MI	Active	
MA 1011	Kappa Master		Las Vegas, Nevada	NV	Active	
MA 1014	Alpha Epsilon Master		Vernon, British Columbia, Canada	BC	Active	
MA 1015	Alpha Beta Master		Tucson, Arizona	AZ	Active	
MA 1018	Beta Master		Winnipeg, Manitoba, Canada	MB	Active	
MA 1020	Delta Master		Greenville, South Carolina	SC	Active	
MA 1021	Eta Master		Butte, Montana	MT	Active	
MA 1022	Eta Master		South Windsor, Connecticut	CT	Active	
MA 1023	Gamma Pi Master		Houston, Texas	TX	Active	
MA 1025	Alpha Lambda Master		Northglenn, Colorado	CO	Active	
MA 1027	Alpha Rho Master		Paxton, Illinois	IL	Active	
MA 1030	Gamma Master		Corner Brook, Newfoundland and Labrador, Canada	NL	Active	
MA 1036	Iota Master		Elberton, Georgia	GA	Active	
MA 1041	Gamma Mu Master		Vista, California	CA	Active	
MA 1042	Alpha Eta Master		Victoria, British Columbia, Canada	BC	Active	
MA 1043	Alpha Theta Master		Abbotsford, British Columbia, Canada	BC	Active	
MA 1047	Beta Delta Master		Etobicoke, Ontario, Canada	ON	Active	
MA 1048	Beta Epsilon Master		Peterborough, Ontario, Canada	ON	Active	
MA 1049	Xi Master		Lethbridge, Alberta, Canada	AB	Active	
MA 1052	Alpha Pi Master		Titusville, Florida	FL	Active	
MA 1055	Beta Zeta Master		London, Ontario, Canada	ON	Active	
MA 1057	Gamma Nu Master		Redlands, California	CA	Active	
MA 1060	Kappa Master		Staten Island, New York	NY	Active	
MA 1061	Upsilon Alpha Master		Mississauga, Ontario, Canada	ON	Active	
MA 1062	Alpha Pi Master		Sikeston, Missouri	MO	Active	
MA 1065	Eta Master		Laramie, Wyoming	WY	Active	
MA 1068	Zeta Master		Pierre, South Dakota	SD	Active	
MA 1070	Alpha Xi Master		Sterling, Colorado	CO	Active	
MA 1075	Gamma Omicron Master		Yreka, California	CA	Active	
MA 1077	Beta Eta Master		Ottawa, Ontario, Canada	ON	Active	
MA 1079	Theta Master		Waterbury, Connecticut	CT	Active	
MA 1081	Xi Master		Caldwell, Idaho	ID	Active	
MA 1083	Gamma Rho Master		Escondido, California	CA	Active	
MA 1085	Upsilon Master		Dubuque, Iowa	IA	Active	
MA 1087	Beta Theta Master		Brantford, Ontario, Canada	ON	Active	
MA 1088	Gamma Tau Master		Hurst, Texas	TX	Active	
MA 1089	Alpha Sigma Master		Winter Haven, Florida	FL	Active	
MA 1091	Epsilon Master		Jackson, Mississippi	MS	Active	
MA 1095	Gamma Tau Master		Sacramento, California	CA	Active	
MA 1098	Alpha Sigma Master		Clinton, Illinois	IL	Active	
MA 1100	Alpha Tau Master		Walla Walla, Washington	WA	Active	
MA 1102	Tau Master		Las Cruces, New Mexico	NM	Active	
MA 1104	Gamma Upsilon Master		Perryton, Texas	TX	Active	
MA 1109	Upsilon Master		Pineville, West Virginia	WV	Active	
MA 1110	Mu Master		Rochester, New York	NY	Active	
MA 1115	Psi Master		Medford, Oregon	OR	Active	
MA 1116	Delta Master		Cumberland, Maryland	MD	Active	
MA 1117	Alpha Xi Master		Lancaster, Pennsylvania	PA	Active	
MA 1118	Theta Master		Sheridan, Wyoming	WY	Active	
MA 1123	Alpha Zeta Master		Bowling Green, Ohio	OH	Active	
MA 1133	Alpha Alpha Master		Grants Pass, Oregon	OR	Active	
MA 1134	Eta Master		Greenwood, Nova Scotia, Canada	NS	Active	
MA 1135	Delta Kappa Master		Corpus Christi, Texas	TX	Active	
MA 1136	Alpha Eta Master		Toledo, Ohio	OH	Active	
MA 1138	Beta Kappa Master		Welland, Ontario, Canada	ON	Active	
MA 1139	Delta Master		Cleveland, Tennessee	TN	Active	
MA 1142	Omicron Master		Sherwood Park, Alberta, Canada	AB	Active	
MA 1143	Alpha Iota Master		Anderson, Indiana	IN	Active	
MA 1149	Alpha Mu Master		La Porte, Indiana	IN	Active	
MA 1152	Lambda Master		Gainesville, Georgia	GA	Active	
MA 1157	Alpha Omicron Master		Mechanicsburg, Pennsylvania	PA	Active	
MA 1158	Alpha Iota Master		Pomeroy, Ohio	OH	Active	
MA 1169	Alpha Pi Master		Harrisburg, Pennsylvania	PA	Active	
MA 1176	Alpha Chi Master		Fort Myers, Florida	FL	Active	
MA 1181	Eta Master		Myrtle Beach, South Carolina	SC	Active	
MA 1184	Delta Zeta Master		Placerville, California	CA	Active	
MA 1187	Delta Beta Master		Temple, Texas	TX	Active	
MA 1188	Delta Gamma Master		Dallas, Texas	TX	Active	
MA 1195	Alpha Sigma Master		Harrisburg, Pennsylvania	PA	Active	
MA 1196	Beta Nu Master		Burlington, Ontario, Canada	ON	Active	
MA 1197	Delta Eta Master		Modesto, California	CA	Active	
MA 1199	Alpha Upsilon Master		Spokane, Washington	WA	Active	
MA 1200	Lambda Master		Muskogee, Oklahoma	OK	Active	
MA 1202	Alpha Mu Master		Powell River, British Columbia, Canada	BC	Active	
MA 1203	Delta Delta Master		Universal City, Texas	TX	Active	
MA 1205	Alpha Tau Master		Du Quoin, Illinois	IL	Active	
MA 1209	Alpha Nu Master		Columbus, Indiana	IN	Active	
MA 1216	Zeta Master		Frederick County, Maryland	MD	Active	
MA 1221	Beta Xi Master		Fort Frances, Ontario, Canada	ON	Active	
MA 1224	Alpha Eta Master		Birmingham, Michigan	MI	Active	
MA 1227	Lambda Master		Salt Lake City, Utah	UT	Active	
MA 1231	Theta Master		Polson, Montana	MT	Active	
MA 1232	Alpha Nu Master		Tucson, Arizona	AZ	Active	
MA 1234	Beta Pi Master		Cambridge, Ontario, Canada	ON	Active	
MA 1238	Delta Theta Master		Madera, California	CA	Active	
MA 1240	Alpha Xi Master		Valparaiso, Indiana	IN	Active	
MA 1241	Omega Master		Huntington, West Virginia	WV	Active	
MA 1242	Alpha Upsilon Master		Chester, Illinois	IL	Active	
MA 1244	Mu Master		Cartersville, Georgia	GA	Active	
MA 1246	Beta Rho Master		Ottawa, Ontario, Canada	ON	Active	
MA 1247	Pi Master		Coeur d'Alene, Idaho	ID	Active	
MA 1249	Beta Alpha Master		Fort Myers, Florida	FL	Active	
MA 1250	Alpha Chi Master		West Frankfort, Illinois	IL	Active	
MA 1251	Alpha Phi Master		Aberdeen, Washington	WA	Active	
MA 1253	Delta Iota Master		China Lake, California	CA	Active	
MA 1255	Alpha Epsilon Master		Richmond, Virginia	VA	Active	
MA 1258	Alpha Pi Master		White Rock, British Columbia, Canada	BC	Active	
MA 1263	Delta Theta Master		Rio Grande City, Texas	TX	Active	
MA 1266	Alpha Delta Master		Beaverton, Oregon	OR	Active	
MA 1267	Epsilon Master		Palmer, Alaska	AK	Active	
MA 1270	Alpha Chi Master		Washington, Pennsylvania	PA	Active	
MA 1276	Gamma Alpha Master		Blue Springs, Missouri	MO	Active	
MA 1278	Kappa Master		Gillette, Wyoming	WY	Active	
MA 1279	Rho Master		Aurora, Nebraska	NE	Active	
MA 1283	Beta Sigma Master		Ajax, Ontario, Canada	ON	Active	
MA 1288	Alpha Theta Master		Richmond, Virginia	VA	Active	
MA 1291	Theta Master		Aberdeen, South Dakota	SD	Active	
MA 1292	Beta Tau Master		Guelph, Ontario, Canada	ON	Active	
MA 1293	Alpha Rho Master		Langley, British Columbia, Canada	BC	Active	
MA 1294	Beta Upsilon Master		North Bay, Ontario, Canada	ON	Active	
MA 1295	Alpha Iota Master		Roanoke, Virginia	VA	Active	
MA 1297	Beta Beta Master		Titusville, Florida	FL	Active	
MA 1300	Beta Gamma Master		Columbus, Ohio	OH	Active	
MA 1301	Iota Master		Hot Springs, South Dakota	SD	Active	
MA 1303	Iota Master		Torrington, Connecticut	CT	Active	
MA 1307	Beta Delta Master		Sanford, Florida	FL	Active	
MA 1308	Omega Master		Council Bluffs, Iowa	IA	Active	
MA 1309	Beta Phi Master		Oshawa, Ontario, Canada	ON	Active	
MA 1310	Alpha Psi Master		Rockford, Illinois	IL	Active	
MA 1312	Epsilon Master		Athens, Tennessee	TN	Active	
MA 1313	Alpha Chi Master		Spokane, Washington	WA	Active	
MA 1317	Mu Master		Richfield, Utah	UT	Active	
MA 1318	Beta Zeta Master		Butler, Missouri	MO	Active	
MA 1319	Beta Chi Master		Scarborough, Ontario, Canada	ON	Active	
MA 1320	Alpha Epsilon Master		Hermiston, Oregon	OR	Active	
MA 1323	Nu Master		Albany, New York	NY	Active	
MA 1324	Alpha Rho Master		Anderson, Indiana	IN	Active	
MA 1325	Lambda Master		Mena, Arkansas	AR	Active	
MA 1327	Delta Mu Master		Friendswood, Texas	TX	Active	
MA 1329	Xi Master		Lawton, Oklahoma	OK	Active	
MA 1331	Zeta Master		Franklin, Tennessee	TN	Active	
MA 1335	Alpha Omega Master		Bethel Park, Pennsylvania	PA	Active	
MA 1336	Tau Master		Meridian, Idaho	ID	Active	
MA 1345	Beta Epsilon Master		Fort Myers, Florida	FL	Active	
MA 1347	Alpha Sigma Master		Surrey, British Columbia, Canada	BC	Active	
MA 1351	Upsilon Master		Boise, Idaho	ID	Active	
MA 1352	Beta Zeta Master		Panama City, Florida	FL	Active	
MA 1353	Beta Eta Master		Gainesville, Florida	FL	Active	
MA 1355	Delta Rho Master		Conroe, Texas	TX	Active	
MA 1356	Delta Master		Sydney, Australia, Australia	NSW	Active	
MA 1357	Xi Master		Tucker, Georgia	GA	Active	
MA 1361	Alpha Zeta Master		Tucson, Arizona	AZ	Active	
MA 1366	Beta Alpha Master		Kennewick, Washington	WA	Active	
MA 1367	Beta Omega Master		Kitchener, Ontario, Canada	ON	Active	
MA 1373	Alpha Master		Whitehorse, Yukon, Canada	YT	Active	
MA 1374	Gamma Alpha Master		St. Catharines, Ontario, Canada	ON	Active	
MA 1375	Alpha Upsilon Master		Dawson Creek, British Columbia, Canada	BC	Active	
MA 1379	Beta Theta Master		Cincinnati, Ohio	OH	Active	
MA 1380	Alpha Delta Master		Marshalltown, Iowa	IA	Active	
MA 1381	Gamma Beta Master		Richmond Hill, Ontario, Canada	ON	Active	
MA 1384	Xi Master		Rocky Point, New York	NY	Active	
MA 1387	Delta Tau Master		Ennis, Texas	TX	Active	
MA 1448	Beta Mu Master		Fort Walton Beach, Florida	FL	Active	
MA 1449	Gamma Iota Master		Gananoque, Ontario, Canada	ON	Active	
MA 1450	Beta Zeta Master		Port Orchard, Washington	WA	Active	
MA 1451	Alpha Tau Master		Muncie, Indiana	IN	Active	
MA 1453	Iota Master		Missoula, Montana	MT	Active	
MA 1456	Delta Phi Master		Modesto, California	CA	Active	
MA 1461	Rho Master		Saskatoon, Saskatchewan, Canada	SK	Active	
MA 1464	Beta Delta Master		Bellevue, Washington	WA	Active	
MA 1466	Beta Lambda Master		Sidney, Ohio	OH	Active	
MA 1472	Epsilon Master		Fredericton, New Brunswick, Canada	NB	Active	
MA 1474	Beta Mu Master		Jefferson City, Missouri	MO	Active	
MA 1476	Beta Nu Master		Fort Lauderdale, Florida	FL	Active	
MA 1481	Omicron Master		Carson City, Nevada	NV	Active	
MA 1483	Alpha Omega Master		Kelowna, British Columbia, Canada	BC	Active	
MA 1485	Beta Nu Master		Warren, Ohio	OH	Active	
MA 1486	Chi Master		American Falls, Idaho	ID	Active	
MA 1489	Beta Xi Master		St. Petersburg, Florida	FL	Active	
MA 1491	Delta Omega Master		Universal City, Texas	TX	Active	
MA 1492	Delta Chi Master		El Cajon, California	CA	Active	
MA 1495	Alpha Mu Master		Christiansburg, Virginia	VA	Active	
MA 1497	Alpha Tau Master		Marshall, Michigan	MI	Active	
MA 1498	Alpha Mu Master		Sioux City, Iowa	IA	Active	
MA 1502	Beta Pi Master		Ocala, Florida	FL	Active	
MA 1505	Alpha Nu Master		Danville, Virginia	VA	Active	
MA 1506	Alpha Epsilon Master		Huntington, West Virginia	WV	Active	
MA 1508	Beta Xi Master		Bethany, Missouri	MO	Active	
MA 1509	Beta Omicron Master		Maryville, Missouri	MO	Active	
MA 1510	Delta Omega Master		Bakersfield, California	CA	Active	
MA 1511	Beta Epsilon Master		Raymond, Washington	WA	Active	
MA 1512	Beta Alpha Master		Duncan, British Columbia, Canada	BC	Active	
MA 1514	Beta Pi Master		Adrian, Missouri	MO	Active	
MA 1515	Beta Eta Master		Erie, Pennsylvania	PA	Active	
MA 1516	Epsilon Alpha Master		San Angelo, Texas	TX	Active	
MA 1519	Alpha Phi Master		Cañon City, Colorado	CO	Active	
MA 1521	Gamma Lambda Master		Goderich, Ontario, Canada	ON	Active	
MA 1523	Alpha Omega Master		Terre Haute, Indiana	IN	Active	
MA 1525	Alpha Nu Master		Davenport, Iowa	IA	Active	
MA 1527	Alpha Upsilon Master		Dowagiac, Michigan	MI	Active	
MA 1531	Beta Rho Master		Clearwater, Florida	FL	Active	
MA 1533	Alpha Omicron Master		Russell, Iowa	IA	Active	
MA 1534	Beta Beta Master		Cranbrook, British Columbia, Canada	BC	Active	
MA 1535	Beta Theta Master		Bethlehem, Pennsylvania	PA	Active	
MA 1539	Beta Gamma Master		Lafayette, Indiana	IN	Active	
MA 1550	Beta Sigma Master		St. Augustine, Florida	FL	Active	
MA 1551	Epsilon Beta Master		Petaluma, California	CA	Active	
MA 1553	Iota Master		Werribee, Victoria, Australia	VIC	Active	
MA 1554	Alpha Kappa Master		Scottsdale, Arizona	AZ	Active	
MA 1558	Sigma Master		Warner Robins, Georgia	GA	Active	
MA 1560	Beta Tau Master		Lancaster, Ohio	OH	Active	
MA 1561	Tau Master		Anadarko, Oklahoma	OK	Active	
MA 1562	Beta Delta Master		Hartford City, Indiana	IN	Active	
MA 1565	Alpha Kappa Master		Larned, Kansas	KS	Active	
MA 1566	Lambda Master		Pennsville, New Jersey	NJ	Active	
MA 1569	Gamma Nu Master		Sault Ste. Marie, Ontario, Canada	ON	Active	
MA 1571	Beta Epsilon Master		Plainfield, Indiana	IN	Active	
MA 1573	Gamma Xi Master		Windsor, Ontario, Canada	ON	Active	
MA 1574	Alpha Xi Master		Yorktown, Virginia	VA	Active	
MA 1575	Iota Master		Baton Rouge, Louisiana	LA	Active	
MA 1577	Epsilon Gamma Master		Denton, Texas	TX	Active	
MA 1578	Theta Master		Cleveland, Tennessee	TN	Active	
MA 1582	Alpha Phi Master		Waterford, Michigan	MI	Active	
MA 1584	Epsilon Gamma Master		Crescent City, California	CA	Active	
MA 1589	Chi Master		Chadron, Nebraska	NE	Active	
MA 1590	Gamma Omicron Master		Port Perry, Ontario, Canada	ON	Active	
MA 1591	Beta Zeta Master		Comox, British Columbia, Canada	BC	Active	
MA 1592	Theta Master		Minot, North Dakota	ND	Active	
MA 1593	Gamma Pi Master		Windsor, Ontario, Canada	ON	Active	
MA 1595	Epsilon Delta Master		Cleveland, Tennessee	TN	Active	
MA 1599	Alpha Omicron Master		Yorktown, Virginia	VA	Active	
MA 1600	Beta Psi Master		Orlando, Florida	FL	Active	
MA 1601	Kappa Master		Whitefish, Montana	MT	Active	
MA 1602	Sigma Master		Moose Jaw, Saskatchewan, Canada	SK	Active	
MA 1604	Lambda Master		Belle Fourche, South Dakota	SD	Active	
MA 1605	Gamma Rho Master		Paris, Ontario, Canada	ON	Active	
MA 1607	Alpha Iota Master		Eugene, Oregon	OR	Active	
MA 1608	Beta Omega Master		Brandon, Florida	FL	Active	
MA 1609	Beta Theta Master		Sidney, British Columbia, Canada	BC	Active	
MA 1611	Beta Kappa Master		Vernon, British Columbia, Canada	BC	Active	
MA 1613	Gamma Sigma Master		Mississauga, Ontario, Canada	ON	Active	
MA 1614	Gamma Tau Master		Peterborough, Ontario, Canada	ON	Active	
MA 1615	Alpha Rho Master		Corydon, Iowa	IA	Active	
MA 1616	Eta Master		Rothesay, New Brunswick, Canada	NB	Active	
MA 1617	Alpha Chi Master		Grand Rapids, Michigan	MI	Active	
MA 1618	Epsilon Epsilon Master		Plainview, Texas	TX	Active	
MA 1620	Gamma Beta Master		Ocala, Florida	FL	Active	
MA 1621	Beta Sigma Master		Keytesville, Missouri	MO	Active	
MA 1629	Gamma Master		Brandon, Manitoba, Canada	MB	Active	
MA 1632	Alpha Sigma Master		Creston, Iowa	IA	Active	
MA 1633	Beta Upsilon Master		Toledo, Ohio	OH	Active	
MA 1635	Beta Nu Master		Nanaimo, British Columbia, Canada	BC	Active	
MA 1636	Mu Master		Williamstown, Victoria, Australia	VIC	Active	
MA 1637	Gamma Upsilon Master		Chatham, Ontario, Canada	ON	Active	
MA 1640	Gamma Phi Master		Guelph, Ontario, Canada	ON	Active	
MA 1642	Beta Tau Master		Poplar Bluff, Missouri	MO	Active	
MA 1645	Mu Master		Sioux Falls, South Dakota	SD	Active	
MA 1648	Beta Chi Master		Wakeman, Ohio	OH	Active	
MA 1649	Alpha Rho Master		Glendale, Arizona	AZ	Active	
MA 1654	Omicron Master		North Little Rock, Arkansas	AR	Active	
MA 1661	Omicron Master		Elko, Nevada	NV	Active	
MA 1664	Beta Zeta Master		Jeffersonville, Indiana	IN	Active	
MA 1666	Beta Upsilon Master		Oak Grove, Missouri	MO	Active	
MA 1668	Gamma Chi Master		Brampton, Ontario, Canada	ON	Active	
MA 1671	Alpha Mu Master		Neodesha, Kansas	KS	Active	
MA 1715	Alpha Iota Master		Morgantown, West Virginia	WV	Active	
MA 1717	Beta Theta Master		Portage, Indiana	IN	Active	
MA 1718	Delta Gamma Master		Orangeville, Ontario, Canada	ON	Active	
MA 1719	Mu Master		Ashland, Kentucky	KY	Active	
MA 1721	Alpha Xi Master		Olathe, Kansas	KS	Active	
MA 1723	Gamma Alpha Master		Akron, Ohio	OH	Active	
MA 1724	Kappa Master		Lebanon, Tennessee	TN	Active	
MA 1725	Alpha Sigma Master		Fairfax, Virginia	VA	Active	
MA 1727	Beta Kappa Master		Harrisburg, Pennsylvania	PA	Active	
MA 1728	Beta Kappa Master		Moline, Illinois	IL	Active	
MA 1730	Gamma Beta Master		Hillsboro, Missouri	MO	Active	
MA 1731	Alpha Pi Master		Hutchinson, Kansas	KS	Active	
MA 1732	Epsilon Iota Master		Hurst, Texas	TX	Active	
MA 1733	Lambda Master		Columbia, South Carolina	SC	Active	
MA 1734	Nu Master		Sumter, South Carolina	SC	Active	
MA 1737	Iota Master		Mount Airy, Maryland	MD	Active	
MA 1738	Beta Alpha Master		Las Vegas, New Mexico	NM	Active	
MA 1739	Delta Delta Master		Owen Sound, Ontario, Canada	ON	Active	
MA 1740	Gamma Gamma Master		Aurora, Missouri	MO	Active	
MA 1742	Beta Pi Master		Delta, British Columbia, Canada	BC	Active	
MA 1745	Epsilon Kappa Master		Stockton, California	CA	Active	
MA 1746	Alpha Chi Master		Indianola, Iowa	IA	Active	
MA 1747	Gamma Eta Master		Lakeland, Florida	FL	Active	
MA 1748	Beta Epsilon Master		Detroit, Michigan	MI	Active	
MA 1750	Alpha Psi Master		Mesa, Arizona	AZ	Active	
MA 1751	Gamma Delta Master		Dexter, Missouri	MO	Active	
MA 1752	Epsilon Lambda Master		Kerrville, Texas	TX	Active	
MA 1753	Beta Rho Master		Port Alberni, British Columbia, Canada	BC	Active	
MA 1754	Delta Epsilon Master		Belle River, Ontario, Canada	ON	Active	
MA 1755	Alpha Kappa Master		Parkersburg, West Virginia	WV	Active	
MA 1756	Beta Nu Master		Altoona, Pennsylvania	PA	Active	
MA 1757	Kappa Master		Baltimore, Maryland	MD	Active	
MA 1758	Omega Master		Dalton, Nebraska	NE	Active	
MA 1760	Epsilon Mu Master		Houston, Texas	TX	Active	
MA 1763	Delta Xi Master		West Chester, Pennsylvania	PA	Active	
MA 1764	Alpha Omega Master		Phoenix, Arizona	AZ	Active	
MA 1766	Epsilon Lambda Master		Fremont, California	CA	Active	
MA 1768	Nu Master		Sioux Falls, South Dakota	SD	Active	
MA 1769	Epsilon Nu Master		Vista, California	CA	Active	
MA 1771	Beta Kappa Master		Richmond, Indiana	IN	Active	
MA 1774	Beta Kappa Master		Spokane, Washington	WA	Active	
MA 1777	Upsilon Master		Saskatoon, Saskatchewan, Canada	SK	Active	
MA 1780	Delta Zeta Master		Stouffville, Ontario, Canada	ON	Active	
MA 1781	Beta Sigma Master		Vancouver, British Columbia, Canada	BC	Active	
MA 1782	Delta Eta Master		London, Ontario, Canada	ON	Active	
MA 1784	Alpha Tau Master		Mission, Kansas	KS	Active	
MA 1788	Beta Nu Master		Elwood, Indiana	IN	Active	
MA 1790	Phi Master		Regina, Saskatchewan, Canada	SK	Active	
MA 1791	Omicron Master		Ripon, Wisconsin	WI	Active	
MA 1973	Beta Zeta Master		Buckeye, Arizona	AZ	Active	
MA 1974	Pi Master		Loudon, Tennessee	TN	Active	
MA 1975	Delta Rho Master		St. Catharines, Ontario, Canada	ON	Active	
MA 1976	Lambda Master		Apple Valley, Minnesota	MN	Active	
MA 1977	Lambda Master		Hamilton, Montana	MT	Active	
MA 1978	Zeta Lambda Master		Ontario, California	CA	Active	
MA 1979	Gamma Gamma Master		Port Alberni, British Columbia, Canada	BC	Active	
MA 1980	Alpha Alpha Master		Greensboro, North Carolina	NC	Active	
MA 1981	Beta Eta Master		Bullhead City, Arizona	AZ	Active	
MA 1982	Delta Sigma Master		Bowmanville, Ontario, Canada	ON	Active	
MA 1983	Beta Tau Master		Bridgeview, Illinois	IL	Active	
MA 1984	Nu Master		Moncton, New Brunswick, Canada	NB	Active	
MA 1987	Tau Master		Rome, New York	NY	Active	
MA 1989	Alpha Gamma Master		Marietta, Georgia	GA	Active	
MA 1990	Delta Tau Master		Hamilton, Ontario, Canada	ON	Active	
MA 1992	Nu Master		Lacombe, Louisiana	LA	Active	
MA 1993	Zeta Gamma Master		Houston, Texas	TX	Active	
MA 1995	Gamma Master		Springfield, Massachusetts	MA	Active	
MA 1996	Beta Sigma Master		Easton, Pennsylvania	PA	Active	
MA 1998	Beta Omicron Master		Colfax, Washington	WA	Active	
MA 1999	Delta Master		Franklin, Massachusetts	MA	Active	
MA 2000	Gamma Epsilon Master		Kimberley, British Columbia, Canada	BC	Active	
MA 2001	Omega Master		Calgary, Alberta, Canada	AB	Active	
MA 2002	Zeta Delta Master		Lewisville, Texas	TX	Active	
MA 2003	Beta Master		Perth, Western Australia, Australia	WA	Active	
MA 2004	Epsilon Theta Master		Lakewood, Colorado	CO	Active	
MA 2005	Zeta Nu Master		Visalia, California	CA	Active	
MA 2007	Gamma Zeta Master		Defiance, Ohio	OH	Active	
MA 2008	Theta Master		Gulf Shores, Alabama	AL	Active	
MA 2009	Zeta Epsilon Master		Lubbock, Texas	TX	Active	
MA 2010	Xi Master		Metairie, Louisiana	LA	Active	
MA 2011	Gamma Omega Master		St. Petersburg, Florida	FL	Active	
MA 2012	Upsilon Master		Rochester, New York	NY	Active	
MA 2013	Gamma Eta Master		Bowling Green, Ohio	OH	Active	
MA 2014	Beta Omicron Master		Flint, Michigan	MI	Active	
MA 2015	Delta Alpha Master		Fort Myers, Florida	FL	Active	
MA 2016	Beta Tau Master		Newport News, Virginia	VA	Active	
MA 2017	Alpha Beta Master		Havelock, North Carolina	NC	Active	
MA 2019	Sigma Master		Knoxville, Tennessee	TN	Active	
MA 2021	Beta Upsilon Master		Covington, Virginia	VA	Active	
MA 2022	Gamma Zeta Master		Duncan, British Columbia, Canada	BC	Active	
MA 2025	Delta Phi Master		Trenton, Ontario, Canada	ON	Active	
MA 2026	Epsilon Master		Plymouth, Massachusetts	MA	Active	
MA 2029	Upsilon Master		Milwaukee, Wisconsin	WI	Active	
MA 2030	Gamma Pi Master		Poplar Bluff, Missouri	MO	Active	
MA 2031	Beta Theta Master		Prescott Valley, Arizona	AZ	Active	
MA 2032	Alpha Beta Master		Albuquerque, New Mexico	NM	Active	
MA 2033	Gamma Rho Master		St. Charles, Missouri	MO	Active	
MA 2034	Beta Pi Master		Manchester, Michigan	MI	Active	
MA 2035	Delta Delta Master		Port St. Lucie, Florida	FL	Active	
MA 2036	Zeta Zeta Master		Georgetown, Texas	TX	Active	
MA 2037	Alpha Pi Master		Petersburg, West Virginia	WV	Active	
MA 2038	Beta Rho Master		Plymouth, Michigan	MI	Active	
MA 2039	Beta Pi Master		Tacoma, Washington	WA	Active	
MA 2040	Alpha Psi Master		Cherryvale, Kansas	KS	Active	
MA 2041	Gamma Eta Master		Victoria, British Columbia, Canada	BC	Active	
MA 2042	Lambda Master		Halifax, Nova Scotia, Canada	NS	Active	
MA 2044	Zeta Omicron Master		Susanville, California	CA	Active	
MA 2045	Nu Master		Saint Paul, Minnesota	MN	Active	
MA 2046	Tau Master		Knoxville, Tennessee	TN	Active	

=== Torchbearer chapters ===
Following are the active Torchbearer chapters of Beta Sigma Phi as of 2026.

Number	Chapter	Charter date and range	Location	State or province	Status	Ref.
TO 100	Torch Alpha		Alton, Illinois	IL	Active	
TO 101	Torch Alpha		Northport, New York	NY	Active	
TO 103	Torch Alpha		Richmond, British Columbia, Canada	BC	Active	
TO 104	Torch Alpha		Toledo, Ohio	OH	Active	
TO 105	Torch Alpha		Bangor, Maine	ME	Active	
TO 108	Torch Alpha		Bremerton, Washington	WA	Active	
TO 109	Torch Beta		Duncan, British Columbia, Canada	BC	Active	
TO 110	Torch Alpha		Pueblo, Colorado	CO	Active	
TO 111	Torch Alpha		Minneapolis, Minnesota	MN	Active	
TO 114	Torch Alpha		Uniontown, Pennsylvania	PA	Active	
TO 116	Torch Alpha		Broken Arrow, Oklahoma	OK	Active	
TO 117	Torch Alpha		Goderich, Ontario, Canada	ON	Active	
TO 118	Torch Alpha		Cody, Wyoming	WY	Active	
TO 119	Torch Alpha		Chula Vista, California	CA	Active	
TO 121	Torch Alpha		Salem, Oregon	OR	Active	
TO 122	Torch Alpha		Mountain Home, Idaho	ID	Active	
TO 125	Torch Alpha		Charleston, West Virginia	WV	Active	
TO 127	Torch Alpha		Lexington, Kentucky	KY	Active	
TO 128	Torch Gamma		Maryville, Missouri	MO	Active	
TO 129	Torch Gamma		Elyria, Ohio	OH	Active	
TO 133	Torch Alpha		Salina, Kansas	KS	Active	
TO 134	Torch Beta		Mount Carmel, Illinois	IL	Active	
TO 135	Torch Gamma		Medford, Oregon	OR	Active	
TO 137	Torch Delta		Mansfield, Ohio	OH	Active	
TO 138	Torch Alpha		Lakeland, Florida	FL	Active	
TO 140	Torch Beta		Sanford, Maine	ME	Active	
TO 142	Torch Epsilon		Cape Girardeau, Missouri	MO	Active	
TO 144	Torch Alpha		Hammond, Indiana	IN	Active	
TO 145	Torch Zeta		Independence, Missouri	MO	Active	
TO 146	Torch Epsilon		Fort Worth, Texas	TX	Active	
TO 148	Torch Beta		Vero Beach, Florida	FL	Active	
TO 149	Torch Alpha		Clear Lake, Iowa	IA	Active	
TO 150	Torch Beta		Lansdale, Pennsylvania	PA	Active	
TO 152	Torch Gamma		Ocala, Florida	FL	Active	
TO 153	Torch Theta		Harrisonville, Missouri	MO	Active	
TO 154	Torch Epsilon		Mansfield, Ohio	OH	Active	
TO 155	Torch Delta		Salem, Oregon	OR	Active	
TO 156	Torch Alpha		Grand Island, Nebraska	NE	Active	
TO 157	Torch Alpha		Virginia Beach, Virginia	VA	Active	
TO 159	Torch Delta		Naperville, Illinois	IL	Active	
TO 160	Torch Gamma		Lancaster, Pennsylvania	PA	Active	
TO 161	Torch Gamma		Aurora, Colorado	CO	Active	
TO 165	Torch Gamma		Woodstock, Ontario, Canada	ON	Active	
TO 167	Torch Delta		Sault Ste. Marie, Ontario, Canada	ON	Active	
TO 168	Torch Epsilon		Marion, Illinois	IL	Active	
TO 171	Torch Delta		Melbourne, Florida	FL	Active	
TO 172	Torch Beta		Beatrice, Nebraska	NE	Active	
TO 173	Torch Alpha		Moose Jaw, Saskatchewan, Canada	SK	Active	
TO 174	Torch Delta		York, Pennsylvania	PA	Active	
TO 175	Torch Gamma		Colusa, California	CA	Active	
TO 176	Torch Epsilon		Pottsville, Pennsylvania	PA	Active	
TO 178	Torch Beta		Martinsburg, West Virginia	WV	Active	
TO 179	Torch Eta		Hummelstown, Pennsylvania	PA	Active	
TO 180	Torch Gamma		Martinsburg, West Virginia	WV	Active	
TO 181	Torch Zeta		Austin, Texas	TX	Active	
TO 182	Torch Delta		Ludington, Michigan	MI	Active	
TO 183	Torch Beta		Moose Jaw, Saskatchewan, Canada	SK	Active	
TO 184	Torch Gamma		Lincoln, Nebraska	NE	Active	
TO 185	Torch Epsilon		Grand Rapids, Michigan	MI	Active	
TO 186	Torch Delta		Comox, British Columbia, Canada	BC	Active	
TO 187	Torch Beta		Duluth, Minnesota	MN	Active	
TO 189	Torch Beta		Hutchinson, Kansas	KS	Active	
TO 191	Torch Alpha		Appleton, Wisconsin	WI	Active	
TO 193	Torch Theta		Tamaqua, Pennsylvania	PA	Active	
TO 194	Torch Beta		Calgary, Alberta, Canada	AB	Active	
TO 195	Torch Eta		Detroit, Michigan	MI	Active	
TO 196	Torch Epsilon		Oshawa, Ontario, Canada	ON	Active	
TO 198	Torch Iota		Cape Girardeau, Missouri	MO	Active	
TO 199	Torch Gamma		Calgary, Alberta, Canada	AB	Active	
TO 200	Torch Alpha		Aiken, South Carolina	SC	Active	
TO 203	Torch Zeta		Hamilton, Ontario, Canada	ON	Active	
TO 208	Torch Epsilon		Victoria, British Columbia, Canada	BC	Active	
TO 210	Torch Lambda		Saginaw, Michigan	MI	Active	
TO 211	Torch Iota		Montoursville, Pennsylvania	PA	Active	
TO 212	Torch Beta		Maysville, Kentucky	KY	Active	
TO 213	Torch Zeta		Merced, California	CA	Active	
TO 216	Torch Zeta		Victoria, British Columbia, Canada	BC	Active	
TO 217	Torch Zeta		Mansfield, Ohio	OH	Active	
TO 219	Torch Lambda		Warrensburg, Missouri	MO	Active	
TO 221	Torch Mu		Flint, Michigan	MI	Active	
TO 222	Torch Alpha		Lafayette, Louisiana	LA	Active	
TO 226	Torch Gamma		Louisville, Kentucky	KY	Active	
TO 228	Torch Kappa		Reading, Pennsylvania	PA	Active	
TO 230	Torch Alpha		Annapolis, Maryland	MD	Active	
TO 231	Torch Beta		Yuma, Arizona	AZ	Active	
TO 232	Torch Gamma		Swift Current, Saskatchewan, Canada	SK	Active	
TO 234	Torch Lambda		Reading, Pennsylvania	PA	Active	
TO 235	Torch Gamma		Reno, Nevada	NV	Active	
TO 236	Torch Epsilon		Jacksonville, Florida	FL	Active	
TO 237	Torch Zeta		Tallahassee, Florida	FL	Active	
TO 238	Torch Eta		Elyria, Ohio	OH	Active	
TO 239	Torch Delta		Weyburn, Saskatchewan, Canada	SK	Active	
TO 240	Torch Eta		Surrey, British Columbia, Canada	BC	Active	
TO 242	Torch Alpha		LaFayette, Georgia	GA	Active	
TO 243	Torch Beta		Glenwood, Iowa	IA	Active	
TO 244	Torch Zeta		Colorado Springs, Colorado	CO	Active	
TO 245	Torch Eta		Belleville, Ontario, Canada	ON	Active	
TO 250	Torch Beta		Elwood, Indiana	IN	Active	
TO 251	Torch Alpha		Pleasantville, New Jersey	NJ	Active	
TO 252	Torch Delta		Reno, Nevada	NV	Active	
TO 253	Torch Nu		Muskegon, Michigan	MI	Active	
TO 254	Torch Alpha		Milford, Delaware	DE	Active	
TO 255	Torch Gamma		Perry, Iowa	IA	Active	
TO 256	Torch Epsilon		Charleston, West Virginia	WV	Active	
TO 257	Torch Lambda		Sacramento, California	CA	Active	
TO 259	Torch Xi		Niles, Michigan	MI	Active	
TO 260	Torch Gamma		Rochester, New York	NY	Active	
TO 261	Torch Epsilon		Carroll, Iowa	IA	Active	
TO 263	Torch Zeta		Decatur, Illinois	IL	Active	
TO 264	Torch Epsilon		Regina, Saskatchewan, Canada	SK	Active	
TO 265	Torch Eta		DeLand, Florida	FL	Active	
TO 266	Torch Alpha		Salt Lake City, Utah	UT	Active	
TO 268	Torch Omicron		Muskegon, Michigan	MI	Active	
TO 269	Torch Theta		Pensacola, Florida	FL	Active	
TO 270	Torch Alpha		Anchorage, Alaska	AK	Active	
TO 271	Torch Iota		Springfield, Ohio	OH	Active	
TO 272	Torch Kappa		Newark, Ohio	OH	Active	
TO 275	Torch Mu		Lock Haven, Pennsylvania	PA	Active	
TO 276	Torch Iota		St. Petersburg, Florida	FL	Active	
TO 277	Torch Gamma		Fort Wayne, Indiana	IN	Active	
TO 278	Torch Mu		Saint Louis, Missouri	MO	Active	
TO 279	Torch Lambda		Toledo, Ohio	OH	Active	
TO 280	Torch Nu		Garden Grove, California	CA	Active	
TO 281	Torch Xi		San Fernando, California	CA	Active	
TO 282	Torch Delta		Fremont, Nebraska	NE	Active	
TO 283	Torch Nu		Norristown, Pennsylvania	PA	Active	
TO 284	Torch Kappa		Lakeland, Florida	FL	Active	
TO 285	Torch Delta		Valparaiso, Indiana	IN	Active	
TO 286	Torch Gamma		Olympia, Washington	WA	Active	
TO 288	Torch Delta		Cedar Rapids, Iowa	IA	Active	
TO 290	Torch Pi		Flint, Michigan	MI	Active	
TO 291	Torch Beta		Sturgis, South Dakota	SD	Active	
TO 293	Torch Nu		Columbia, Missouri	MO	Active	
TO 294	Torch Mu		Abilene, Texas	TX	Active	
TO 296	Torch Theta		Fort Collins, Colorado	CO	Active	
TO 297	Torch Xi		Hatboro, Pennsylvania	PA	Active	
TO 298	Torch Omicron		Scranton, Pennsylvania	PA	Active	
TO 299	Torch Epsilon		Lafayette, Indiana	IN	Active	
TO 300	Torch Zeta		Elwood, Indiana	IN	Active	
TO 301	Torch Pi		Scranton, Pennsylvania	PA	Active	
TO 303	Torch Eta		Salem, Illinois	IL	Active	
TO 304	Torch Iota		Pueblo, Colorado	CO	Active	
TO 305	Torch Theta		Barrie, Ontario, Canada	ON	Active	
TO 306	Torch Iota		Toronto, Canada	ON	Active	
TO 307	Torch Pi		Redding, California	CA	Active	
TO 308	Torch Gamma		Raleigh, North Carolina	NC	Active	
TO 309	Torch Kappa		Cobourg, Ontario, Canada	ON	Active	
TO 310	Torch Rho		Carlisle, Pennsylvania	PA	Active	
TO 311	Torch Zeta		Fairmont, West Virginia	WV	Active	
TO 312	Torch Xi		Albany, Missouri	MO	Active	
TO 313	Torch Lambda		Huntsville, Ontario, Canada	ON	Active	
TO 314	Torch Mu		Springfield, Ohio	OH	Active	
TO 315	Torch Mu		Barrie, Ontario, Canada	ON	Active	
TO 316	Torch Rho		Pacifica, California	CA	Active	
TO 317	Torch Alpha		Montreal, Quebec, Canada	QC	Active	
TO 319	Torch Nu		Tiffin, Ohio	OH	Active	
TO 320	Torch Eta		Wheeling, West Virginia	WV	Active	
TO 321	Torch Kappa		Northglenn, Colorado	CO	Active	
TO 322	Torch Delta		Watertown, New York	NY	Active	
TO 323	Torch Alpha		Montgomery, Alabama	AL	Active	
TO 324	Torch Beta		Enid, Oklahoma	OK	Active	
TO 326	Torch Eta		Des Moines, Iowa	IA	Active	
TO 327	Torch Gamma		Richmond, Virginia	VA	Active	
TO 329	Torch Delta		Enid, Oklahoma	OK	Active	
TO 330	Torch Lambda		Sarasota, Florida	FL	Active	
TO 333	Torch Alpha		Nashville, Tennessee	TN	Active	
TO 334	Torch Epsilon		Lincoln, Nebraska	NE	Active	
TO 335	Torch Xi		Rossford, Ohio	OH	Active	
TO 336	Torch Omicron		Cape Girardeau, Missouri	MO	Active	
TO 337	Torch Delta		Winchester, Virginia	VA	Active	
TO 338	Torch Gamma		Brewer, Maine	ME	Active	
TO 340	Torch Lambda		Englewood, Colorado	CO	Active	
TO 341	Torch Epsilon		Hillsboro, Oregon	OR	Active	
TO 342	Torch Delta		Seattle, Washington	WA	Active	
TO 343	Torch Beta		Milwaukee, Wisconsin	WI	Active	
TO 344	Torch Rho		Kalamazoo, Michigan	MI	Active	
TO 345	Torch Zeta		Beatrice, Nebraska	NE	Active	
TO 346	Torch Tau		Sacramento, California	CA	Active	
TO 348	Torch Alpha		Miramichi, New Brunswick, Canada	NB	Active	
TO 350	Torch Omicron		Mingo Junction, Ohio	OH	Active	
TO 351	Torch Delta		Topeka, Kansas	KS	Active	
TO 354	Torch Iota		Woodridge, Illinois	IL	Active	
TO 355	Torch Eta		Hartford City, Indiana	IN	Active	
TO 356	Torch Xi		Sault Ste. Marie, Ontario, Canada	ON	Active	
TO 357	Torch Mu		Pace, Florida	FL	Active	
TO 358	Torch Kappa		Mount Carmel, Illinois	IL	Active	
TO 359	Torch Rho		St. Charles, Missouri	MO	Active	
TO 360	Torch Theta		Mason City, Iowa	IA	Active	
TO 361	Torch Pi		Wooster, Ohio	OH	Active	
TO 362	Torch Alpha		Socorro, New Mexico	NM	Active	
TO 363	Torch Nu		Brush, Colorado	CO	Active	
TO 365	Torch Iota		Boone, Iowa	IA	Active	
TO 366	Torch Sigma		Bethlehem, Pennsylvania	PA	Active	
TO 367	Torch Nu		Brandon, Florida	FL	Active	
TO 368	Torch Beta		Las Cruces, New Mexico	NM	Active	
TO 370	Torch Nu		West Columbia, Texas	TX	Active	
TO 371	Torch Beta		Albany, Georgia	GA	Active	
TO 372	Torch Kappa		Osceola, Iowa	IA	Active	
TO 373	Torch Delta		Middlesboro, Kentucky	KY	Active	
TO 375	Torch Delta		Bloomington, Minnesota	MN	Active	
TO 376	Torch Omicron		Fort Frances, Ontario, Canada	ON	Active	
TO 378	Torch Phi		Pacifica, California	CA	Active	
TO 381	Torch Delta		Bangor, Maine	ME	Active	
TO 382	Torch Xi		Sweetwater, Texas	TX	Active	
TO 383	Torch Omicron		Victoria, Texas	TX	Active	
TO 386	Torch Alpha		Grand Falls-Windsor, Newfoundland and Labrador, Canada	NL	Active	
TO 387	Torch Chi		North Fork, California	CA	Active	
TO 389	Torch Sigma		Ashtabula, Ohio	OH	Active	
TO 391	Torch Eta		Lincoln, Nebraska	NE	Active	
TO 394	Torch Alpha		Columbus, Mississippi	MS	Active	
TO 395	Torch Omega		Arroyo Grande, California	CA	Active	
TO 396	Torch Alpha		Halifax, Nova Scotia, Canada	NS	Active	
TO 398	Torch Pi		Denton, Texas	TX	Active	
TO 399	Torch Rho		San Antonio, Texas	TX	Active	
TO 401	Torch Zeta		Puyallup, Washington	WA	Active	
TO 402	Torch Alpha		Perth, Western Australia, Australia	WA	Active	
TO 404	Torch Beta		Lewiston, Idaho	ID	Active	
TO 405	Torch Psi		Mount Shasta, California	CA	Active	
TO 406	Torch Zeta		Regina, Saskatchewan, Canada	SK	Active	
TO 407	Torch Beta		Nashville, Tennessee	TN	Active	
TO 408	Torch Pi		Peterborough, Ontario, Canada	ON	Active	
TO 410	Torch Sigma		Georgetown, Texas	TX	Active	
TO 411	Torch Gamma		Boise, Idaho	ID	Active	
TO 412	Torch Eta		Port Orchard, Washington	WA	Active	
TO 413	Torch Rho		Windsor, Ontario, Canada	ON	Active	
TO 414	Torch Alpha Beta		Arroyo Grande, California	CA	Active	
TO 415	Torch Xi		Colorado Springs, Colorado	CO	Active	
TO 416	Torch Sigma		Independence, Missouri	MO	Active	
TO 417	Torch Sigma		Sault Ste. Marie, Ontario, Canada	ON	Active	
TO 418	Torch Beta		Casper, Wyoming	WY	Active	
TO 419	Torch Eta		Portland, Oregon	OR	Active	
TO 420	Torch Gamma		Hampton, New Brunswick, Canada	NB	Active	
TO 421	Torch Epsilon		Asheboro, North Carolina	NC	Active	
TO 422	Torch Upsilon		Oakville, Ontario, Canada	ON	Active	
TO 423	Torch Delta		Watertown, South Dakota	SD	Active	
TO 425	Torch Nu		Vernon, British Columbia, Canada	BC	Active	
TO 426	Torch Theta		Indianapolis, Indiana	IN	Active	
TO 427	Torch Xi		Victoria, British Columbia, Canada	BC	Active	
TO 428	Torch Epsilon		Louisville, Kentucky	KY	Active	
TO 429	Torch Gamma		Gadsden, Alabama	AL	Active	
TO 431	Torch Eta		Regina, Saskatchewan, Canada	SK	Active	
TO 432	Torch Omicron		Punta Gorda, Florida	FL	Active	
TO 433	Torch Lambda		Chariton, Iowa	IA	Active	
TO 434	Torch Sigma		Adrian, Michigan	MI	Active	
TO 435	Torch Beta		Utica, New York	NY	Active	
TO 436	Torch Zeta		Hopkinsville, Kentucky	KY	Active	
TO 437	Torch Epsilon		Presque Isle, Maine	ME	Active	
TO 438	Torch Tau		Houston, Texas	TX	Active	
TO 439	Torch Iota		Crown Point, Indiana	IN	Active	
TO 440	Torch Lambda		Charleston, Illinois	IL	Active	
TO 441	Torch Epsilon		Sioux Falls, South Dakota	SD	Active	
TO 442	Torch Beta		Bridgeport, Connecticut	CT	Active	
TO 443	Torch Epsilon		Phoenix, Arizona	AZ	Active	
TO 444	Torch Beta		Halifax, Nova Scotia, Canada	NS	Active	
TO 445	Torch Iota		Huntington, West Virginia	WV	Active	
TO 449	Torch Zeta		Havelock, North Carolina	NC	Active	
TO 450	Torch Phi		Cobourg, Ontario, Canada	ON	Active	
TO 451	Torch Zeta		Phoenix, Arizona	AZ	Active	
TO 453	Torch Chi		Exeter, Ontario, Canada	ON	Active	
TO 454	Torch Nu		Knoxville, Iowa	IA	Active	
TO 455	Torch Eta		Flagstaff, Arizona	AZ	Active	
TO 456	Torch Upsilon		Austin, Texas	TX	Active	
TO 457	Torch Pi		Orlando, Florida	FL	Active	
TO 458	Torch Omega		Peterborough, Ontario, Canada	ON	Active	
TO 459	Torch Alpha Delta		Chico, California	CA	Active	
TO 460	Torch Tau		Grand Rapids, Michigan	MI	Active	
TO 462	Torch Omicron		Delta, British Columbia, Canada	BC	Active	
TO 463	Torch Tau		Reading, Pennsylvania	PA	Active	
TO 464	Torch Theta		Prineville, Oregon	OR	Active	
TO 465	Torch Beta		Salt Lake City, Utah	UT	Active	
TO 466	Torch Iota		Omaha, Nebraska	NE	Active	
TO 467	Torch Gamma		Albuquerque, New Mexico	NM	Active	
TO 468	Torch Alpha Alpha		Kemptville, Ontario, Canada	ON	Active	
TO 469	Torch Alpha		Black Rock, Victoria, Australia	VIC	Active	
TO 470	Torch Gamma		Madison, Wisconsin	WI	Active	
TO 471	Torch Xi		Des Moines, Iowa	IA	Active	
TO 472	Torch Tau		Springfield, Missouri	MO	Active	
TO 473	Torch Omicron		Council Bluffs, Iowa	IA	Active	
TO 474	Torch Pi		New Westminster, British Columbia, Canada	BC	Active	
TO 475	Torch Delta		Quispamsis, New Brunswick, Canada	NB	Active	
TO 476	Torch Phi		Santa Fe, Texas	TX	Active	
TO 477	Torch Kappa		Washington, Indiana	IN	Active	
TO 478	Torch Eta		Hendersonville, North Carolina	NC	Active	
TO 479	Torch Delta		Florence, Alabama	AL	Active	
TO 480	Torch Chi		Lufkin, Texas	TX	Active	
TO 481	Torch Zeta		Virginia Beach, Virginia	VA	Active	
TO 482	Torch Upsilon		Tecumseh, Michigan	MI	Active	
TO 483	Torch Eta		Derby, Kansas	KS	Active	
TO 484	Torch Zeta		Reno, Nevada	NV	Active	
TO 485	Torch Psi		Deer Park, Texas	TX	Active	
TO 486	Torch Zeta		Mobile, Alabama	AL	Active	
TO 487	Torch Zeta Zeta		Fresno, California	CA	Active	
TO 488	Torch Epsilon		Virginia, Minnesota	MN	Active	
TO 489	Torch Omega		Houston, Texas	TX	Active	
TO 490	Torch Beta		Lexington, South Carolina	SC	Active	
TO 491	Torch Gamma		Columbia, South Carolina	SC	Active	
TO 492	Torch Eta		Norfolk, Virginia	VA	Active	
TO 493	Torch Theta		Raleigh, North Carolina	NC	Active	
TO 494	Torch Chi		Dallas, Oregon	OR	Active	
TO 495	Torch Upsilon		Williamsport, Pennsylvania	PA	Active	
TO 496	Torch Alpha Alpha		Garland, Texas	TX	Active	
TO 497	Torch Theta		Shawnee Mission, Kansas	KS	Active	
TO 498	Torch Rho		Orlando, Florida	FL	Active	
TO 499	Torch Epsilon		Tulsa, Oklahoma	OK	Active	
TO 500	Torch Rho		Trail, British Columbia, Canada	BC	Active	
TO 501	Torch Alpha Zeta		Mission Viejo, California	CA	Active	
TO 502	Torch Sigma		Daytona Beach, Florida	FL	Active	
TO 503	Torch Tau		Niceville, Florida	FL	Active	
TO 504	Torch Alpha		Providence, Rhode Island	RI	Active	
TO 505	Torch Theta		Sierra Vista, Arizona	AZ	Active	
TO 507	Torch Upsilon		Sedalia, Missouri	MO	Active	
TO 508	Torch Kappa		De Witt, Nebraska	NE	Active	
TO 509	Torch Gamma		Ogden, Utah	UT	Active	
TO 510	Torch Mu		Golconda, Illinois	IL	Active	
TO 511	Torch Gamma		Mount Eliza, Victoria, Australia	VIC	Active	
TO 512	Torch Alpha Eta		El Cajon, California	CA	Active	
TO 513	Torch Gamma		Baton Rouge, Louisiana	LA	Active	
TO 514	Torch Alpha Theta		Redwood City, California	CA	Active	
TO 515	Torch Phi		Council Bluffs, Iowa	IA	Active	
TO 516	Torch Upsilon		Cocoa, Florida	FL	Active	
TO 517	Torch Epsilon		St. Albert, Alberta, Canada	AB	Active	
TO 518	Torch Alpha Beta		Amarillo, Texas	TX	Active	
TO 519	Torch Alpha Beta		Oshawa, Ontario, Canada	ON	Active	
TO 520	Torch Alpha Gamma		Amarillo, Texas	TX	Active	
TO 521	Torch Theta		Lynchburg, Virginia	VA	Active	
TO 522	Torch Alpha Iota		Arvin, California	CA	Active	
TO 523	Torch Phi		Independence, Missouri	MO	Active	
TO 524	Torch Omicron		Greeley, Colorado	CO	Active	
TO 525	Torch Iota		Prescott Valley, Arizona	AZ	Active	
TO 526	Torch Pi		Englewood, Colorado	CO	Active	
TO 527	Torch Iota		Topeka, Kansas	KS	Active	
TO 528	Torch Kappa		Brandon, Florida	FL	Active	
TO 529	Torch Phi		Tecumseh, Michigan	MI	Active	
TO 530	Torch Pi		Cedar Rapids, Iowa	IA	Active	
TO 531	Torch Alpha Gamma		Ottawa, Ontario, Canada	ON	Active	
TO 532	Torch Kappa		Parkersburg, West Virginia	WV	Active	
TO 533	Torch Alpha Delta		Port Hope, Ontario, Canada	ON	Active	
TO 534	Torch Zeta		Calgary, Alberta, Canada	AB	Active	
TO 535	Torch Epsilon		Rome, New York	NY	Active	
TO 537	Torch Epsilon		Quispamsis, New Brunswick, Canada	NB	Active	
TO 538	Torch Gamma		Halifax, Nova Scotia, Canada	NS	Active	
TO 539	Torch Eta		Edmonton, Alberta, Canada	AB	Active	
TO 540	Torch Delta		Columbia, South Carolina	SC	Active	
TO 541	Torch Alpha Kappa		Mission Viejo, California	CA	Active	
TO 542	Torch Sigma		New Westminster, British Columbia, Canada	BC	Active	
TO 543	Torch Alpha Lambda		Visalia, California	CA	Active	
TO 544	Torch Chi		North Kansas City, Missouri	MO	Active	
TO 545	Torch Phi		Tampa, Florida	FL	Active	
TO 546	Torch Iota		Bellevue, Washington	WA	Active	
TO 547	Torch Zeta		Henryetta, Oklahoma	OK	Active	
TO 548	Torch Tau		Parksville, British Columbia, Canada	BC	Active	
TO 550	Torch Lambda		Hammond, Indiana	IN	Active	
TO 551	Torch Upsilon		Lima, Ohio	OH	Active	
TO 552	Torch Alpha Epsilon		Peterborough, Ontario, Canada	ON	Active	
TO 553	Torch Mu		Anderson, Indiana	IN	Active	
TO 554	Torch Chi		Lakeland, Florida	FL	Active	
TO 555	Torch Beta		Wilmington, Delaware	DE	Active	
TO 556	Torch Alpha Delta		Katy, Texas	TX	Active	
TO 557	Torch Psi		Orlando, Florida	FL	Active	
TO 558	Torch Delta		Wisconsin Rapids, Wisconsin	WI	Active	
TO 559	Torch Iota		Calgary, Alberta, Canada	AB	Active	
TO 560	Torch Psi		Atlantic, Iowa	IA	Active	
TO 561	Torch Alpha Zeta		Peterborough, Ontario, Canada	ON	Active	
TO 562	Torch Omega		Richmond, Virginia	VA	Active	
TO 563	Torch Alpha Alpha		Yakima, Washington	WA	Active	
TO 564	Torch Psi		North Kansas City, Missouri	MO	Active	
TO 565	Torch Gamma Chi		San Diego, California	CA	Active	
TO 566	Torch Omega		Ocala, Florida	FL	Active	
TO 567	Torch Nu		New Albany, Indiana	IN	Active	

=== Online chapters ===
Following are the active online chapters of Beta Sigma Phi as of 2026, along with known inactive chapters.

Number	Chapter	Charter date and range	Location	State or province	Status	Ref.
OL 101	Online Alpha	September 15, 1998	Kansas City, Missouri	MO	Active	(Note: This was the sorority's first online chapter; it started meeting on January 27, 1997.)
OL 102	Online Beta		Kansas City, Missouri	MO	Active	
OL 103	Online Gamma		Kansas City, Missouri	MO	Active	
OL 104	Online Delta		Kansas City, Missouri	MO	Active	
OL 105	Online Epsilon		Kansas City, Missouri	MO	Active	
OL 106	Online Zeta		Kansas City, Missouri	MO	Active	
OL 107	Online Eta		Kansas City, Missouri	MO	Active	
OL 108	Online Theta		Kansas City, Missouri	MO	Active	
OL 110	Online Kappa		Kansas City, Missouri	MO	Active	
OL 111	Online Lambda		Kansas City, Missouri	MO	Active	
OL 112	Online Xi		Kansas City, Missouri	MO	Active	
OL 118	Online Sigma		Kansas City, Missouri	MO	Active	
OL 119	Online Alpha Alpha				Inactive	
	Online Phi	xxxx ? – November 2002			Inactive	
OL 122	Online Chi		Kansas City, Missouri	MO	Active	
OL 123	Online Psi		Kansas City, Missouri	MO	Active	
OL 124	Online Omega		Kansas City, Missouri	MO	Active	
OL 130	Online Alpha Gamma		Kansas City, Missouri	MO	Active	
OL 145	Online Alpha Phi		Kansas City, Missouri	MO	Active	
OL 148	Online Alpha Omega		Kansas City, Missouri	MO	Active	
