= Texas State Highway OSR =

State highway in Texas, United States

State Highway OSR
- Old San Antonio Road
- SH OSR; highlighted in red

Route information
- Maintained by TxDOT
- Length: 61.918 mi (99.647 km)
- Existed: 1942–present

Major junctions
- West end: SH 21 west of Bryan
- US 190 / SH 6 in Benchley; I-45 south of Leona; SH 75 south-southeast of Leona
- East end: SH 21 at Midway

Location
- Country: United States
- State: Texas
- Counties: Brazos, Robertson, Leon, Madison

Highway system
- Highways in Texas; Interstate; US; State; Former; Toll; Loops; Spurs; FM/RM; Park; Rec
← SH NASA Road 1	→ SH 1

State Highway OSR (SH OSR) is a 61.918-mile (99.647 km) non-numbered state highway in southeastern Texas, United States, that forms a northern loop off of Texas State Highway 21 (SH 21).

The route is the section of the Old San Antonio Road in east-central Texas that is maintained by the Texas Department of Transportation. While most of the original Old San Antonio Road (that is, the section of the road that is not private property) follows SH 21, SH OSR provides a routing close to the original alignment of the road near and around the Bryan-College Station metropolitan area.

"OSR" is the only state highway in Texas with a completely alphabetical designation and one of only two where the designation begins with a letter (Texas State Highway NASA Road 1 being the other with a beginning letter).

== Route description ==
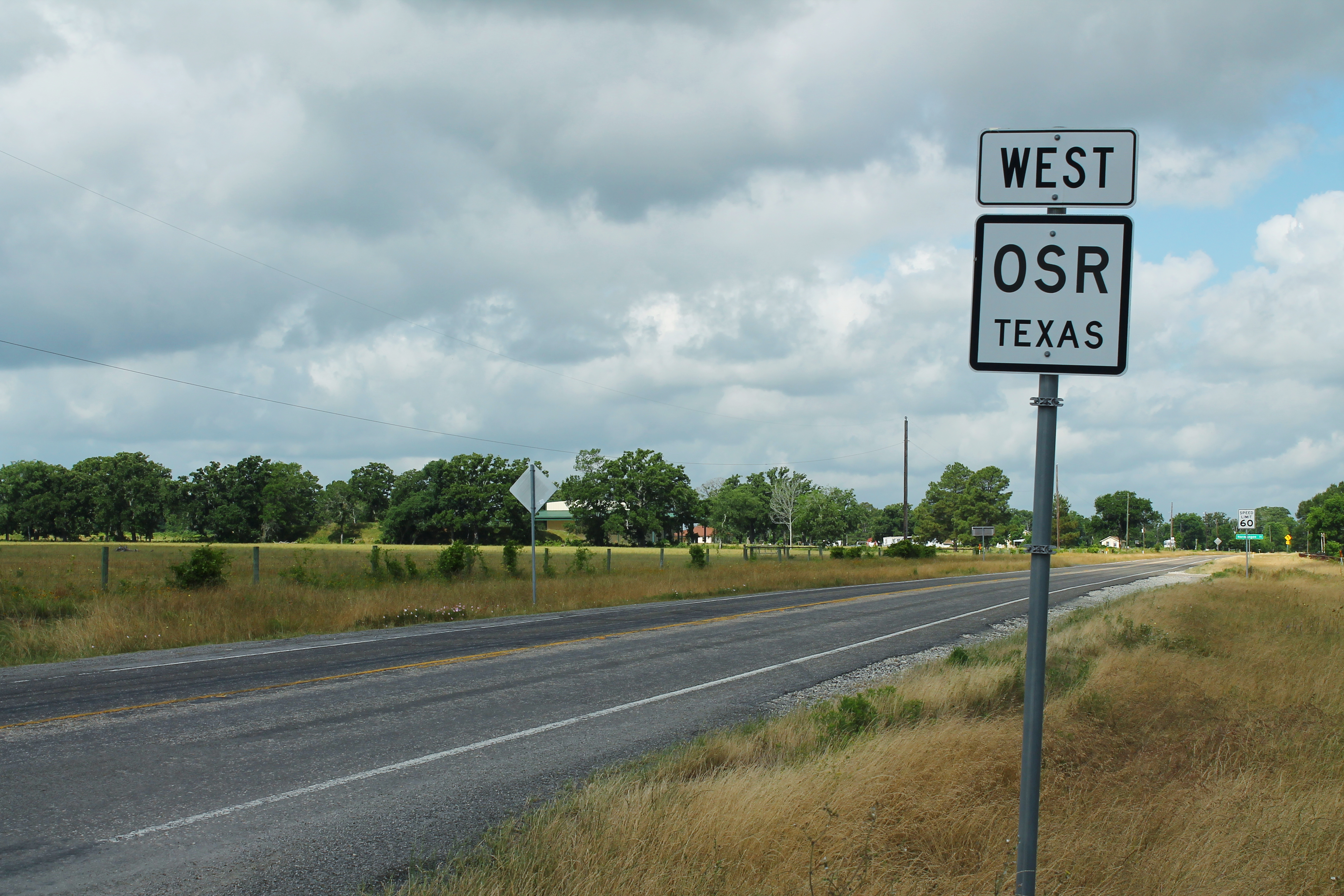
Along SH OSR west of Normangee, near Interstate 45, May 2014

OSR begins at an intersection of SH 21 just east of the Brazos River in Brazos County. It crosses U.S. Route 190 (US 190) / Texas State Highway 6 north of Bryan. Just west of this intersection, it begins to run along the county line between Brazos County and Robertson County. Upon crossing the Navasota River, SH OSR continues as the county line, this time between Leon County and Madison County. It passes through Normangee and crosses Interstate 45 (I-45). East of I-45, SH OSR crosses solely into Madison County and ends at Midway at another junction with SH 21.

== History ==
SH OSR was originally designated on September 17, 1929, as Texas State Highway 938, to run from Midway to SH 6 (now also US 190) in Benchley, and a second section was designated from SH 21 northeast of Giddings to SH 29 (now US 183) north of Lockhart. On July 15, 1935, the section from SH 44 (now US 77) in Lincoln to SH 21 became part of SH 21. On April 19, 1938, the section from Lincoln to Bastrop also became part of SH 21. On March 26, 1942, a section from US 81 (now I-35) in San Marcos east 4.4 miles (7.1 km) was added (creating a gap), and the designation was changed to SH OSR. On April 28, 1942, the road was extended from Benchley to SH 21 near the Brazos River. On August 2, 1943, the section from SH 29 to 4.4 miles (7.1 km) east of San Marcos was added, closing the gap. Later that day, the section from Bastrop to San Marcos became part of SH 21.

== Major intersections ==
County	Location	mi	km	Destinations	Notes
Brazos		0.00	0.00	SH 21 – Caldwell, Bryan	Western terminus
Brazos		4.2	6.8	FM 1687 (Sandy Point Road) – Bryan	
Brazos–Robertson county line	Benchley	8.0	12.9	US 190 / SH 6 to Spur 231 – Waco, Houston	Interchange; future I-14; access to Spur 231 via southern frontage road
Brazos–Robertson county line		12.1	19.5	FM 2223 south – Bryan	
Brazos–Robertson county line		18.8	30.3	FM 46 north – Wheelock	
Brazos–Robertson county line		27.3	43.9	FM 1940 north – Franklin, New Baden	
Navasota River		29.0	46.7	Bridge	
Madison–Leon county line		31.1	50.1	FM 1452 east	
Madison–Leon county line	Normangee	37.2	59.9	FM Spur 3 to FM 3 – Hilltop Lakes	
Madison–Leon county line	Normangee	37.5	60.4	FM 39 – Jewett, North Zulch	
Madison–Leon county line		39.4	63.4	FM 2289 east	
Madison–Leon county line		46.3	74.5	FM 2485 north	
Madison–Leon county line		48.0	77.2	I-45 – Dallas, Houston	Interchange; I-45 exit 152
Madison		50.3	81.0	SH 75 – Madisonville, Leona	
Madison		54.8	88.2	FM 579 north	
Madison		57.2	92.1	FM 2346 south	
Madison		58.1	93.5	FM 1119 north – Centerville	
Madison	Midway	62.0	99.8	SH 21 – Madisonville, Crockett	Eastern terminus
1.000 mi = 1.609 km; 1.000 km = 0.621 mi

== See also ==
- List of state highways in Texas
