= Hiram "Doc" Jones =

American minister and military chaplain (born 1937)

Hiram L. Jones
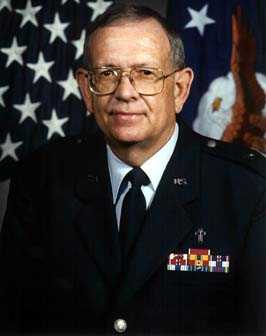
- US Air Force photo of Jones
- Born: Hiram Lee Jones; 7 November 1937 (age 88); Madisonville, Texas, US
- Other name: "Doc"
- Education: B.S., Sam Houston State U.; M.Div., Perkins Theological
- Occupation: Chaplain
- Military career
- Branch: United States Air Force
- Years: 1969–1999
- Rank: Brigadier general
- Awards: AF Distinguished Svc.; Legion of Merit

Ecclesiastical career
- Religion: Christianity
- Church: United Methodist
- Title: Elder

Hiram Lee "Doc" Jones (born 7 November 1937) is an American United Methodist leader and retired chaplain in the US Air Force.

== Personal life ==
In Madisonville, Texas, on 7 November 1937, Hiram Lee Jones was born to Ada (née Standley; born 1897/1898) and Dan L. Jones (born 1891/1892). By the 1940 United States census, Jones had two siblings: brother Jim Dand (born 1926/1927) and sister Doris Marie (born 1929/1930), and the family lived on a farm in rural Madison County, Texas.

Jones graduated from Madisonville High School. He later earned a Bachelor of Science from Sam Houston State University in 1959, and was ordained in the United Methodist Church in 1963. Jones received a Master of Divinity (M.Div.) from Perkins School of Theology, and after spending six years serving civilian parishes, he joined the United States Air Force in 1969. In 1974, Wiley College awarded Jones the honorary degree, Doctor of Divinity. By January 1997, Jones was an ordained Elder in the United Methodist Church. After his retirement, Jones and his wife moved to Greater Houston in 1999.

== US Air Force ==
Ranks held
Date	Insignia & rank
17 June 1970	Captain
1 May 1979	Major
1 January 1984	Lieutenant colonel
1 May 1989	Colonel
1 August 1997	Brigadier general

After joining in 1969, Jones spent that May through July 1985 as a chaplain at Kincheloe, Andrews, Kalkar Kaserne, Bergstrom, and Maxwell Air Force Bases. From July 1985 – July 1991, Jones served in the office of the command chaplain for Pacific Air Forces (at Hickam Air Force Base) and Air Training Command (at Randolph Air Force Base). After a two-year stint as the senior chaplain at Bolling Air Force Base, Jones was the command chaplain for United States Air Forces in Europe (at Ramstein Air Base) and Air Combat Command (at Langley Air Force Base) from June 1993 – June 1997.

In June 1997, Jones was made the Deputy Chief of Chaplains of the United States Air Force and assigned to Washington, D.C. In that capacity at the turn of the 21st century, when USA Today made news reporting on Wiccan airmen at a South Carolina Air Force base, Deputy Chief Jones told the investigating US senator—Strom Thurmond—that, "if you can tell us what religion America's religious freedom doesn't cover, we won't let them practice it."

Jones retired from the Air Force on 1 December 1999. Among the awards and decorations earned by General Jones were an Air Force Distinguished Service Medal, a Legion of Merit, eight Meritorious Service Medals, an Air Force Commendation Medal, three Air Force Outstanding Unit Awards, two Air Force Organizational Excellence Awards, and a National Defense Service Medal.
