= Route OSR =

Route OSR or Highway OSR may refer to:

- Texas State Highway OSR
- Old San Antonio Road
