= Chris Taylor (wide receiver) =

American football player (born 1979)

No. 83, 1
- Position: Wide receiver

Personal information
- Born: April 25, 1979 (age 47); Temple, Texas, U.S.
- Listed height: 5 ft 10 in (1.78 m)
- Listed weight: 187 lb (85 kg)

Career information
- High school: Madisonville (Madisonville, Texas)
- College: Texas A&M (1997–2000)
- NFL draft: 2001: 7th round, 218th overall pick

Career history
- Pittsburgh Steelers (2001)*; Buffalo Bills (2001)*; Tennessee Titans (2001)*; St. Louis Rams (2002)*; New York Giants (2002)*; BC Lions (2003); Houston Texans (2004)*; → Amsterdam Admirals (2004)
- * Offseason or practice squad member only
- Stats at Pro Football Reference

Christopher Tremayne Taylor (born April 25, 1979) is an American former football wide receiver. He played college football at Texas A&M, and was selected by the Pittsburgh Steelers in the seventh round of the 2001 NFL draft. He played professionally in the Canadian Football League and NFL Europe.

== Early life ==
Christopher Tremayne Taylor was born on April 25, 1979, in Temple, Texas. He attended Madisonville High School in Madisonville, Texas.

== College career ==
Taylot was a four-year letterman for the Texas A&M Aggies from 1997 to 2000. He only caught three passes as a freshman in 1997. He finished his college career with totals of 83 receptions for 1,316 yards and seven touchdowns, six carries for 69 yards and one touchdown, 17 kick returns for 350 yards, and 76 punt returns for 581 yards.

== Professional career ==
Taylor was selected by the Pittsburgh Steelers in the seventh round, with the 218th overall pick, of the 2001 NFL draft. He officially signed with the team on May 30. He was released on August 31, 2001.

Taylor was signed to the Buffalo Bills' practice squad on September 3, 2001. He was released on September 26, 2001.

Taylor was signed to the practice squad of the Tennessee Titans on October 17, 2001. He became a free agent after the 2001 season, and signed with the St. Louis Rams on January 11, 2002. He was later released on September 1, 2002.

Taylor was signed to the New York Giants' practice squad on December 17, 2002. He became a free agent after the season, and re-signed with New York. He was released on May 2, 2003.

Taylor was signed to the practice roster of the BC Lions of the Canadian Football League in late August 2003. He was later promoted to the active roster and dressed in four games for the Lions during the 2003 season, recording one catch for five yards, 16 kickoff returns for 237 yards, and 20 punt returns for 145 yards. He was released by the Lions on October 24, 2003.

Taylor signed with the Houston Texans on January 26, 2004. In February 2004, he was allocated to NFL Europe to play for the Amsterdam Admirals. He started all ten games for Amsterdam during the 2004 NFL Europe season, totaling 42 receptions for 573 yards and five touchdowns, 12 kickoff returns for 267 yards, and 17 punt returns for 131 yards. Taylor was released by the Texans on September 5, 2004.
