= Joseph Jones (basketball) =

American basketball player and coach

UTEP Miners
- Position: Assistant coach
- League: Mountain West Conference

Personal information
- Born: March 21, 1986 (age 40) Normangee, Texas, U.S.
- Listed height: 6 ft 9 in (2.06 m)
- Listed weight: 280 lb (127 kg)

Career information
- High school: Normangee (Normangee, Texas)
- College: Texas A&M (2004–2008)
- NBA draft: 2008: undrafted
- Playing career: 2008–present

Career history

Playing
- 2008–2009: Oyak Renault
- 2009–2011: STB Le Havre
- 2011–2012: Hapoel Gilboa Galil
- 2012: Metros de Santiago
- 2012–2013: CAI Zaragoza
- 2013: Cangrejeros de Santurce
- 2013–2014: CAI Zaragoza
- 2014–2015: Hapoel Jerusalem
- 2015–2016: Canarias
- 2016–2017: Azad University Tehran
- 2017–2018: Limoges CSP
- 2019–2020: Santeros de Aguada

Coaching
- 2021–2023: Tarleton State (assistant)
- 2023–2024: Tarleton State (interim head coach)
- 2024–2025: UTSA (assistant)
- 2025-present: Tarleton State (assistant)

Career highlights
- As coach: WAC Coach of the Year (2024); As player: BSN champion (2019)

Joseph CostelloReshawn Jones (born March 21, 1986) is an American college basketball coach and former player who is currently an assistant coach for the UTEP Miners of the Mountain West Conference.

== Early years ==
Jones was born March 21, 1986, to D.C. Nealey and Betty Jones in Normangee, Texas.

As a sophomore, junior, and senior at Normangee High School, Jones was a first-team All-State pick. Jones averaged 22.4 points and 15.1 rebounds in his senior year and led the school to a 37–2 record, including a 23-game winning streak to finish the regular season. The team earned a trip to the Class A Division I championship game, where Jones was named most valuable player with 21 points, 17 rebounds, and 5 blocked shots. Jones was ranked as the Number 86 prospect in the country by HoopScoop and the 12th best post prospect by Rivals.

Jones was recruited by Kansas, Texas, Arkansas, and Texas Tech, but signed a National Letter of Intent to play at Texas A&M under coach Melvin Watkins.

== College career ==
=== Freshman year ===
Before Jones arrived at Texas A&M, Aggies coach Melvin Watkins was forced out, with former UTEP coach Billy Gillispie taking over the program. Regardless, Jones chose to honor his commitment and made an immediate impact, scoring 10 points and making 10 rebounds in his college debut against North Carolina A&T. Jones started all 31 games, ranked second on the team in scoring with 12.7 points per game and dunks (18), and led the Aggies in rebounding (7.3), field goal percentage (.577), blocked shots (39), and three-point plays (16). He posted seven double-doubles, the most by a Big 12 freshman, and scored 10 or more points 23 times, also setting the A&M freshman record by completing 103 free throws. His performance earned him honorable mention All-Big 12 honors and a place on the Big-12 All-Freshman team, with CollegeInsider.Com also naming him to their Freshman All-America team.

With a then-career-high twenty-five points, Jones led the Aggies to a win against Clemson in the first round of the NIT.

=== Sophomore year ===
As a sophomore, Jones started all of the team's games, averaging 15.3 points and a team-best 6.5 rebounds. In one of his most impressive games of the season, Jones scored 31 points against Texas, the most points an Aggie had scored in Austin since 1963. In that game he tied two Big 12 records, one for field goals in a half, making 9 of 11 second-half field goal attempts, as well as for most consecutive shots, making nine straight shots to end the game. Jones also made the game-winning shot against Oklahoma State, completing an 8-foot jumper with one second remaining. The Aggies lost their rematch with the Cowboys despite Jones's 27 points. Against North Texas, Jones scored a career-high 35 points and had a career-high 13 rebounds.

Jones ranked in the conference's top 10 in scoring and rebounding, despite averaging fewer than 30 minutes per game. His performance earned him consensus second-team All-Big 12 honors, and he was named to the second-team Academic All-Big 12.

The Aggies earned a spot in the NCAA Tournament for the first time since 1987. The Aggies won their first-round match-up against Syracuse and appeared poised to reach the Sweet 16 when, with 18 seconds left in their second-round game against LSU, the Aggies went up 57–55. The dream was dashed fifteen seconds later, however, when Glen Davis completed a three-point shot for LSU.

=== Junior year ===
Expectations were raised for Jones's junior season when he and teammate Acie Law IV were named to the John R. Wooden pre-season top 50 All-American watch list, and the team received a Number 13 rank in the pre-season AP poll. The team had their best start since opening 16–2 in the 1959–1960 season, as well as their best conference opening since the inception of the Big 12.

After suffering knee problems throughout non-conference play, Jones has been a big part of the Aggies' successful 2006-2007 season, averaging 13.2 points per game and a team-best 6.4 rebounds per game. Despite a cramp in his calf that kept him out of most of the second half of the game against Iowa State, Jones still scored 21 points.

The Aggies ranked in the top 10 throughout the season. On February 3, 2007, Jones's Aggies became the first Big 12 South team (in 32 attempts) to ever beat the Kansas Jayhawks at Allen Fieldhouse. Two days later the team earned a 100–82 victory over their archrivals, then-Number 25 Texas, their twenty-first straight home win, making them the sole leader of the Big 12.

Although the Aggies were the number two seed for the Big 12 Conference Tournament, they played poorly in the quarterfinals of the tournament and were eliminated by Oklahoma State.

The Aggies were named a Number 3 seed in the South region of the 2007 NCAA Tournament. In their first-round game against Penn, Jones finished with a double-double, 14 points and 11 rebounds. He energized the team in the second half, scoring two dunks in less than a minute to give the Aggies the lead. The Aggies won 68–52 to advance to the second round of the tournament, where they subsequently defeated Louisville and advanced to the Sweet Sixteen for the first time since 1980.

=== Senior year ===
Jones and Texas Longhorns player D. J. Augustin were featured on the cover of the November 15, 2007, issue of Sports Illustrated. Jones graduated from A&M a semester early.

== Professional career ==
After his college career, Jones joined the Houston Rockets 2008 Summer League. The team had a 12-man roster and was coached by Rockets assistant coach Elston Turner. The team played five games against other NBA teams from July 14–20, 2008.

In the season 2008–09 has been playing at Oyak Renaul Bursa in the Turkish Basketball League. He's averaged 32.2 minutes and 13.9 points per game being the second top-scorer of the team during this season.

In 2012, after spending two years in France with STB Le Havre and one year in Israel with Hapoel Gilboa Galil, Jones signs with Spanish squad CAI Zaragoza.

In September 2014, Jones signed with Hapoel Jerusalem of Israel.

On October 19, 2016, Jones signed with Azad University Tehran. On February 21, 2017, he moved to French club Limoges CSP.

== Coaching career ==
In January 2021, Jones was announced as an assistant coach at Tarleton State under his former coach Billy Gillispie. In November 2023, Jones was named acting head coach when Gillispie took an indefinite medical leave of absence. Jones won 21 games while leading the Texans in an interim role, and was named the 2024 Western Athletic Conference coach of the year.

In April 2024 Jones became an assistant coach at UTSA.

In June 2026, after one season with UTSA and another with Tarleton State, Jones became an assistant coach at UTEP.

== Head coaching record ==
Record table
| Season | Team | Overall | Conference | Standing | Postseason |
|---|---|---|---|---|---|
Tarleton State Texans (Western Athletic Conference) (2023–2024)
| 2023–24 | Tarleton State | 23–8 | 16–4 | 2nd | CIT Semifinal |
| Tarleton State: | | 23–8 (.742) | 16–4 (.800) | | |
| Total: | | 23–8 (.742) | | | |
National champion Postseason invitational champion Conference regular season champion Conference regular season and conference tournament champion Division regular season champion Division regular season and conference tournament champion Conference tournament champion
