= Madison County Courthouse (Texas) =

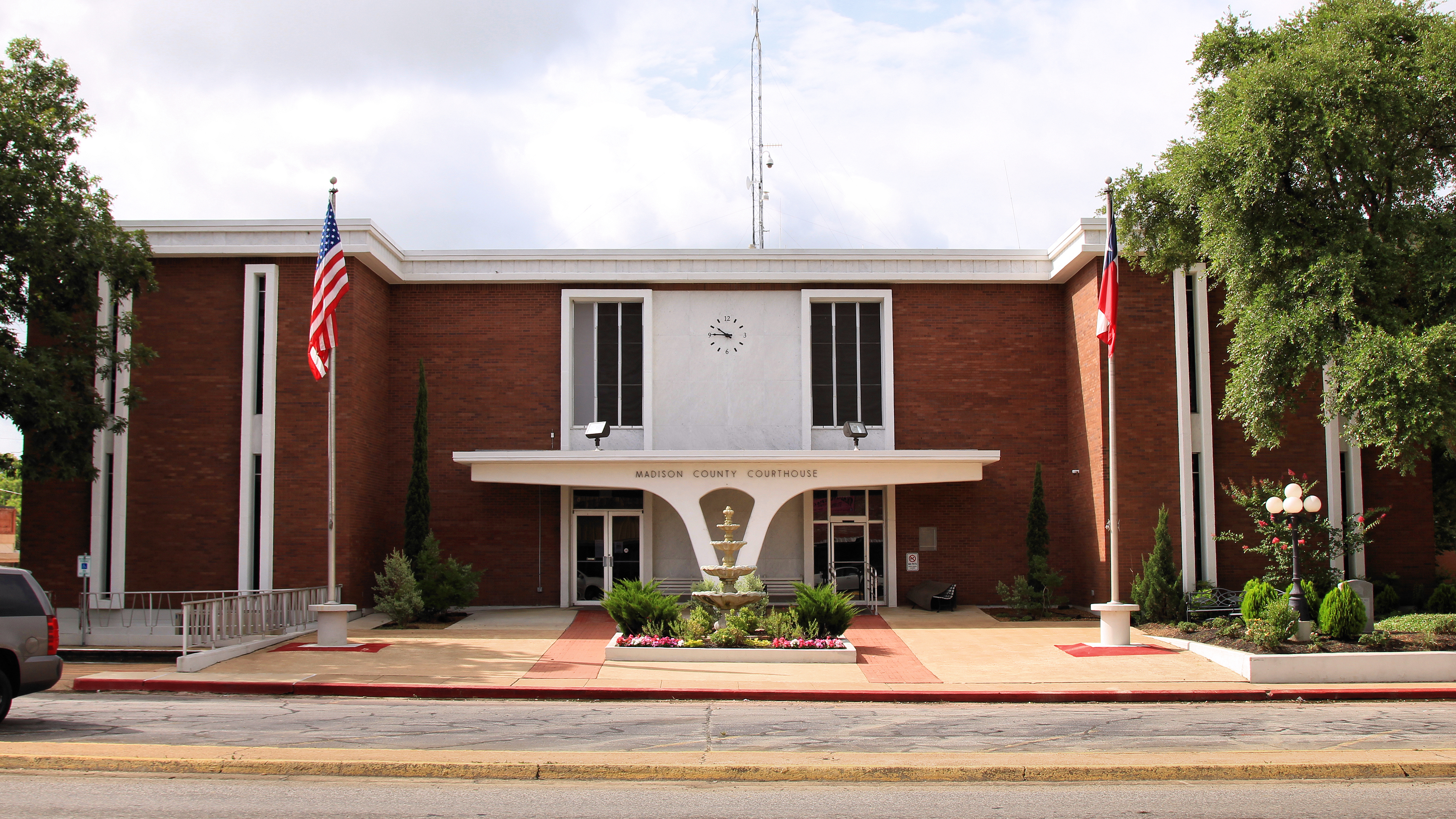
- The Madison County Courthouse in 2019

- Location within Texas Madison County Courthouse (the United States)

General information
- Architectural style: Modern
- Location: 101 W. Main St. Madisonville, Texas
- Coordinates: 30°56′55″N 95°54′50″W
- Completed: 1970

Technical details
- Material: Brick, concrete

Design and construction
- Architects: Dickson, Dickson, Buckley & Bullock

The Madison County Courthouse is the courthouse in Madisonville, Texas.

The current structure was built in 1969. It is at least the fifth courthouse to serve Madison County.

In 2013, it was listed in "Five Of The Ugliest Texas County Courthouses" by Houstonia magazine.

== See also ==
- List of county courthouses in Texas
