= North Zulch High School =

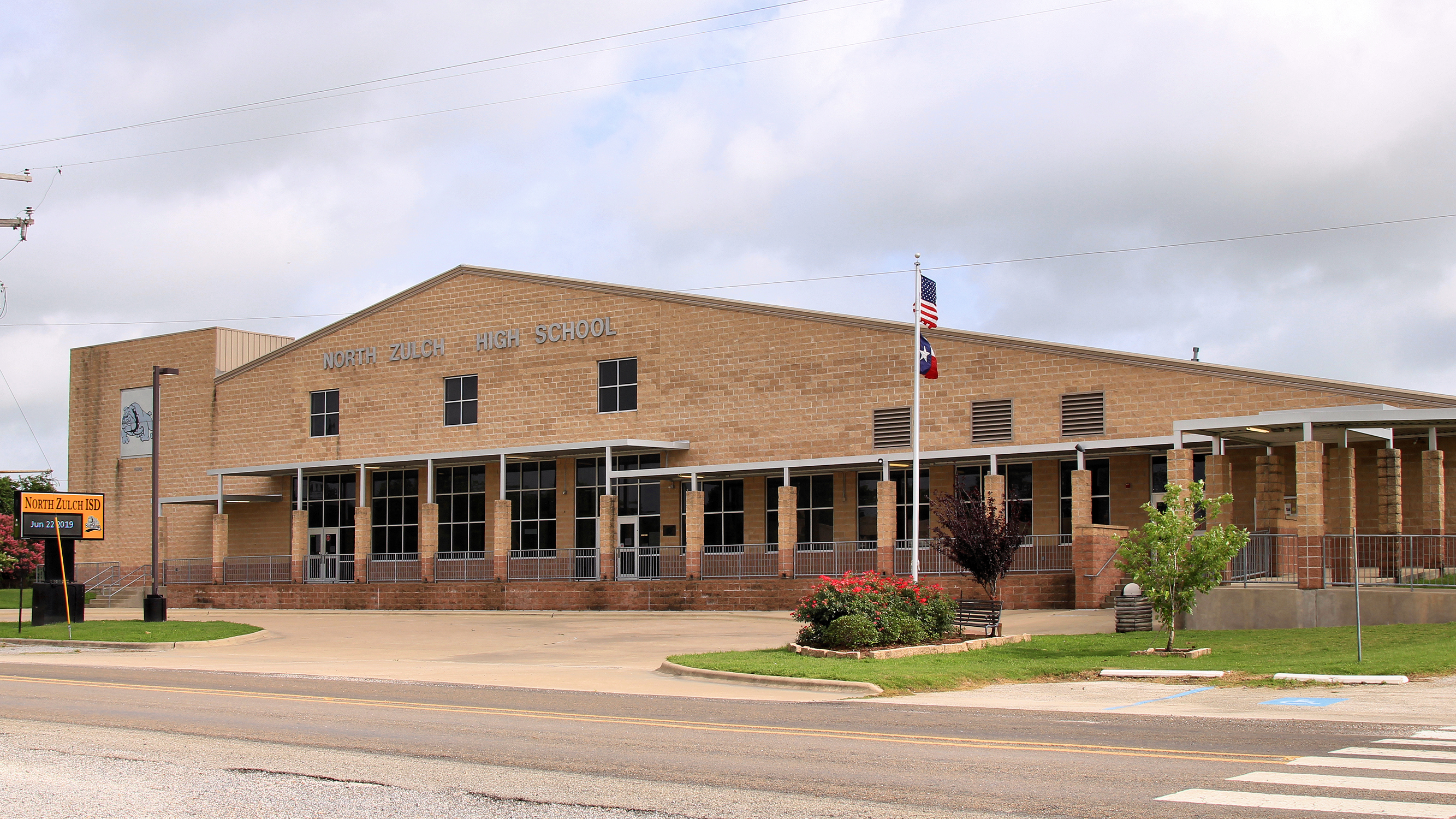

Location
- 11450 5th Street; North Zulch, Texas 77872-0158; United States; 30.917030°N 96.106524°W

Information
- School type: Public High School
- School district: North Zulch Independent School District
- Principal: Donald May
- Teaching staff: 33.03 (FTE)
- Grades: PK-12
- Enrollment: 333 (2024-2025)
- Student to teacher ratio: 10.08
- Colors: Black & Gold
- Athletics conference: UIL Class A
- Mascot: Bulldog
- Website: www.nzisd.org

North Zulch High School is a 1A public high school located in unincorporated North Zulch, Texas (USA). It is part of the North Zulch Independent School District located in west central Madison County. In 2011, the school was rated "Academically Acceptable" by the Texas Education Agency.
