= List of Old San Antonio Road DAR markers =

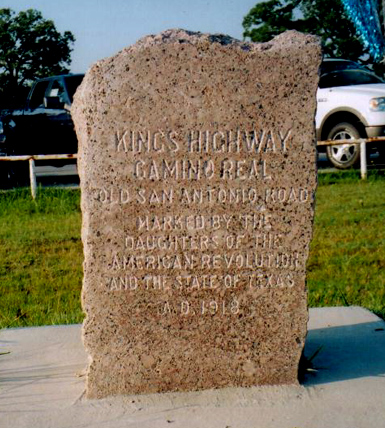
A typical marker placed along the route of the Old San Antonio Road in 1918.

Following is a list of granite markers placed by the Texas Society Daughters of the American Revolution that designate one of the main routes of the Old San Antonio Road through Texas as surveyed in 1915 and placed in 1918. There were never any markers numbered 103-107 because of a numbering error by the surveyor.

As of October 2015, 110 of the 123 markers have been documented. This includes 106 that have been documented since 2013 and 4 more that were documented circa 1995 and are known or assumed to still exist. 13 markers have never been documented.

Most of the stones have been moved to accommodate highway construction, ranching operations, or to get them off of private land and make them accessible to the public. As of 2015, only 34 of the 110 documented markers were within 100 feet of their original 1918 locations.

Old San Antonio Road DAR Markers
Marker #	Latitude	Longitude	County	Date last documented	Image
1	31.462148	-93.753750	Sabine County	Aug. 10, 2013	
2	31.44233	-93.77390	Sabine County	Aug. 10, 2013	
3	31.43275	-93.84733	Sabine County	Aug. 10, 2013	
4	31.475916	-93.917280	Sabine County	Aug. 10, 2013	
5	unknown	unknown	Sabine County	1918	
6	31.511393	-94.0488556	San Augustine County	Aug. 10, 2013	
7	31.522973	-94.115937	San Augustine County	Aug. 10, 2013	
8	31.52585	-94.19386	San Augustine County	Aug. 10, 2013	
9	31.505546	-94.270636	San Augustine County	Aug. 10, 2013	
10	31.5046023	-94.307046	Nacogdoches County	Aug. 10, 2013	
11	31.52312	-94.36872	Nacogdoches County	Aug. 31, 2013	
12	31.565295	-94.48926	Nacogdoches County	Aug. 31, 2013	
13	unknown	unknown	Nacogdoches County	1918	
14	31.59971	-94.61390	Nacogdoches County	Aug. 10, 2013	
15	31.60285	-94.65449	Nacogdoches County	Aug. 10, 2013	
16	31.626144	-94.731591	Nacogdoches County	Aug. 10, 2013	
17	31.658169	-94.801413	Nacogdoches County	Aug. 31, 2013	
18	31.67326	-94.87796	Nacogdoches County	Aug. 31, 2013	
19	unknown	unknown	Cherokee County	1918	
20	31.654495	-95.038107	Cherokee County	Sep. 30, 2013	
21	31.650664	-95.073025	Cherokee County	Sep. 30, 2013	
22	31.604941	-95.139407	Cherokee County	Sep. 30, 2013	
23	31.576121	-95.168511	Houston County	Oct. 26, 2013	
24	31.526760	-95.247896	Houston County	Oct. 26, 2013	
25	31.493704	-95.273708	Houston County	Oct. 26, 2013	
26	31.432620	-95.321598	Houston County	Oct. 26, 2013	
27	31.376477	-95.373935	Houston County	Oct. 26, 2013	
28	31.314600	-95.419851	Houston County	Oct. 26, 2013	
29	31.296459	-95.496690	Houston County	Nov. 16, 2013	
30	31.247057	-95.566903	Houston County	Nov. 16, 2013	
31	31.204458	-95.626198	Houston County	Nov. 16, 2013	
32	31.142759	-95.667619	Houston County	Nov. 16, 2013	
33	31.063904	-95.716535	Madison County	Feb. 22, 2014	
34	31.024622	-95.752205	Madison County	Mar. 22, 2014	
35	31.059346	-95.827645	Madison County	Mar. 22, 2014	
36	31.083452	-95.926091	Madison County	Mar. 22, 2014	
37	31.076820	-96.002642	Leon-Madison County line	Mar. 22, 2014	
38	31.037200	-96.098010	Leon-Madison County line	Mar. 22, 2014 (Note: There is a granite marker about halfway between the original locations of Marker #38 and Marker #39. It is unknown which marker this one is and which one is missing.)	
39	unknown	unknown	Leon-Madison County line	1918	
40	30.99205	-96.186232	Leon-Madison County line	Mar. 22, 2014	
41	30.971051	-96.248107	Brazos-Robertson County line	Mar. 22, 2014	
42	30.934035	-96.315954	Brazos-Robertson County line	Apr. 19, 2014	
43	30.880590	-96.370144	Brazos-Robertson County line	Mar. 22, 2014	
44	30.820374	-96.412801	Brazos-Robertson County line	Apr. 19, 2014	
45	30.755733	-96.451097	Brazos-Robertson County line	Apr. 19, 2014	
46	30.702818	-96.488081	Brazos County	Apr. 19, 2014	
47	30.645595	-96.505614	Brazos County	Apr. 19, 2014	
48	30.624438	-96.54463	Burleson County	May 10, 2014	
49	unknown	unknown	Burleson County	1918	
50	30.596100	-96.610539	Burleson County	Apr. 19, 2014	
51	30.562824	-96.668192	Burleson County	May 10, 2014	
52	30.525363	-96.710137	Burleson County	May 10, 2014	
53	30.471872	-96.768686	Burleson County	May 10, 2014	
54	30.435223	-96.798796	Burleson County	May 10, 2014	
55	30.405617	-96.818384	Lee County	May 31, 2014	
56	30.368932	-96.873518	Lee County	May 31, 2014	
57	30.322003	-96.926998	Lee County	May 31, 2014	
57B	30.291272	-96.960875	Lee County	May 31, 2014	
58	30.262832	-96.974243	Lee County	May 31, 2014	
59	30.231695	-97.025965	Lee County	May 31, 2014	
60	30.229620	-97.073668	Bastrop County	May 31, 2014	
61	30.214017	-97.117281	Bastrop County	June 21, 2014	
62	30.157091	-97.216053	Bastrop County	May 31, 2014	
63	30.112564	-97.290489	Bastrop County	May 31, 2014	
64	30.110671	-97.315175	Bastrop County	May 31, 2014	
65	30.105287	-97.318553	Bastrop County	June 21, 2014	
66	30.110234	-97.403396	Bastrop County	July 12, 2014	
67	30.095981	-97.465165	Bastrop County	July 12, 2014	
68	unknown	unknown	Bastrop County	1918	
69	unknown	unknown	Caldwell County	1918	
70	30.023080	-97.707887	Caldwell County	Aug. 2, 2014	
71	29.982066	-97.763209	Caldwell-Hays County line	Jul. 12, 2014	
72	29.934476	-97.818236	Caldwell-Hays County line	Jul. 12, 2014	
73	29.902699	-97.867914	Caldwell-Hays County line	Jul. 12, 2014	
74	29.842490	-97.913034	Hays County	Aug. 2, 2014	
75	29.813210	-97.967469	Hays County	Aug. 2, 2014	
76	29.794372	-98.013933	Comal County	Aug. 2, 2014	
77	29.759950	-98.049333	Comal County	Oct. 19, 2014	
78	29.695467	-98.113737	Comal County	Aug. 23, 2014	
79	29.662083	-98.186333	Comal County	Aug. 23, 2014	
80	29.638384	-98.260415	Comal County	Aug. 23, 2014	
81	29.604217	-98.328317	Bexar County	Aug. 23, 2014	
82	29.563304	-98.391343	Bexar County	Sep. 20, 2014	
83	29.515267	-98.453583	Bexar County	Sep. 20, 2014	
84	29.446017	-98.503417	Bexar County	Sep. 20, 2014	
85	29.378283	-98.489167	Bexar County	Sep. 20, 2014	
86	29.320895	-98.455218	Bexar County	Nov. 8, 2014	
87	29.289899	-98.502535	Bexar County	Mar. 28, 2015	
88	29.263450	-98.491092	Bexar County	Mar. 28, 2015	
89	29.166898	-98.500884	Bexar County	Aug. 7, 2015	
90	29.145066	-98.497409	Atascosa County	Mar. 28, 2015	
91	29.127383	-98.495750	Atascosa County	Mar. 28, 2015	
92	unknown	unknown	Atascosa County	1995 (est.)	
93	28.956539	-98.601730	Atascosa County	Mar. 28, 2015	
94	28.916013	-98.596652	Atascosa County	Mar. 28, 2015	
95	unknown	unknown	Atascosa County	1918	
96	28.835907	-98.689757	Atascosa County	Mar. 28, 2015	
97	28.782667	-98.740333	Atascosa County	Mar. 28, 2015	
98	28.708980	-98.786671	Atascosa County	Mar. 28, 2015	
99	unknown	unknown	Frio County	1995 (est.)	
100	unknown	unknown	La Salle County	1918	
101	28.462947	-98.816203	La Salle County	April 25, 2015	
102	28.436380	-98.879290	La Salle County	April 25, 2015	
108	28.443396	-98.932342	La Salle County	Aug. 9, 2015	
109	28.465673	-99.000933	La Salle County	June 6, 2015	
110	28.464793	-99.110030	La Salle County	June 6, 2015	
111	28.450900	-99.171267	La Salle County	June 6, 2015	
112	28.436930	-99.233853	La Salle County	June 6, 2015	
113	unknown	unknown	La Salle County	1918	
114	28.280443	-99.285313	La Salle County	Aug. 8, 2015	
115	28.294548	-99.395127	Dimmit County	July 11, 2015	
116	28.311595	-99.465727	Dimmit County	July 11, 2015	
117	28.331864	-99.564784	Dimmit County	July 11, 2015	
118	28.351605	-99.613910	Dimmit County	July 11, 2015	
119	28.31967	-99.7025	Dimmit County	1995 (est.)	
120	28.275168	-99.836681	Dimmit County	Aug. 8, 2015	
121	28.26567	-99.91798	Dimmit County	Aug. 8, 2015	
122	28.256849	-99.963027	Dimmit County	Aug. 8, 2015	
123	28.270116	-100.019254	Dimmit County	Aug. 8, 2015	
124	28.2727	-100.07275	Dimmit County	1995 (est.)	
125	unknown	unknown	Maverick County	1918	
126	unknown	unknown	Maverick County	1918	
127	unknown	unknown	Maverick County	1918	
128	unknown	unknown	Maverick County	1918	
