= Madisonville Consolidated Independent School District =

School district in Texas, United States

Address
- 718 Bacon Street Madisonville, Texas, 77864; United States

District information
- Type: Public
- Grades: PK–12
- Schools: 4
- NCES District ID: 4828710

Students and staff
- Students: 2,392 (2023–2024)
- Teachers: 172.65 (on an FTE basis) (2023–2024)
- Staff: 149.85 (on an FTE basis) (2023–2024)
- Student–teacher ratio: 13.85 (2023–2024)

Other information
- Website: www.madisonvillecisd.org

Madisonville Consolidated Independent School District is a public school district based in Madisonville, Texas (USA).

In addition to Madisonville, the district serves the cities of Midway and Bedias as well as rural areas in eastern Madison and northeastern Grimes counties.

In 2009, the school district was rated "academically acceptable" by the Texas Education Agency.

== Schools ==
- Madisonville High School (Grades 9–12)
- Madisonville Junior High (Grades 6–8)
- Madisonville Intermediate (Grades 3–5)
- Madisonville Elementary (Grades PK-2)

Madisonville High School located in Madisonville, Texas, is a 4A school.
