= Madisonville High School =

Location
- 811A S May St; Madisonville, Madison County, Texas 77864–0879; United States; 30.944977°N 95.905518°W

Information
- School type: Public high school
- School district: Madisonville Consolidated Independent School District
- Superintendent: Keith West
- NCES School ID: 482871003251
- Principal: Shelli Sheppard
- Faculty: 55.55 (on an FTE basis)
- Grades: 9–12
- Enrollment: 684 (2023–2024)
- Student to teacher ratio: 12.31
- Colors: Blue & Red
- Athletics conference: UIL Class 4A
- Mascot: Mustangs
- Website: Madisonville HS website

Madisonville High School is a public high school located in Madisonville, Texas and classified as a 4A school by the UIL. It is part of the Madisonville Consolidated Independent School District in Madison County.

== History ==
Madisonville High School became a public high school around the late 19th or early 20th century within a segregated system. It initially served white students while a separate school, Marian Anderson High School, served black students. Full integration was completed in January 1971 after Marian Anderson closed.

== Demographics ==
As of the 2023-2024 school year, there are 684 students enrolled at Madisonville High School. Around 66.8% of students are eligible for free or reduced-price lunch. The ethnic distribution of students is as follows:

- 41.1% White
- 40.5% Hispanic
- 15.6% African American
- 0.4% Asian
- 0.1% American Indian
- 0% Native Hawaiian/Pacific Islander
- 2.2% Two or More Races

== Academics ==
For the 2024-2025 school year, the school was rated "A" by the Texas Education Agency. The school offers Dual Credit courses, which allow students to earn both high school and college credit at the same time through the Lone Star College system.

== Athletics ==
The Madisonville Mustangs compete in the following sports:

- Baseball
- Basketball
- Cross country
- Football
- Golf
- Soccer
- Softball
- Tennis
- Track and field
- Volleyball

== Notable alumni ==
- Hiram "Doc" Jones (1955), retired U.S. Air Force brigadier general and chaplain
- Sam Bennet (2017), professional golfer
