= North Zulch =

Coordinates: 30°55′04″N 96°06′30″W

- Unincorporated community
- Interactive map of North Zulch
- Country: United States
- State: Texas
- County: Madison
- Elevation: 318 ft (97 m)

Population Estimated
  - Total: 350
- Time zone: UTC-6 (Central (CST))
  - Summer (DST): UTC-5 (CDT)
- Postal code: 77872
- Area code: 936

North Zulch is an unincorporated community in Madison County, Texas, United States, at the intersection of Farm to Market Road 39 and State Highway 21. It is 6 miles (9.7 km) from the Navasota River and 13 miles (21 km) west of Madisonville in west-central Madison County.

North Zulch has a post office using the ZIP code 77872.

== Education ==
The North Zulch Independent School District has served the community for over 100 years and is home to the North Zulch High School Bulldogs. The school is a 1A public school.
