= Normangee Independent School District =

School district in Texas, United States

Address
- 116 Spur 3 Normangee, Texas, 77871; United States

District information
- Type: Public
- Grades: PK–12
- Schools: 3
- NCES District ID: 4832910

Students and staff
- Students: 649 (2023–2024)
- Teachers: 58.46 (on an FTE basis) (2023–2024)
- Staff: 55.23 (on an FTE basis) (2023–2024)
- Student–teacher ratio: 11.10 (2023–2024)

Other information
- Website: www.normangeeisd.org

Normangee Independent School District is a public school district based in Normangee, Texas (USA). Located in Leon County, a small portion of the district extends into Madison County.

== Schools ==
The district has three campuses –

- Normangee High School (Grades (9-12)
- Normangee Middle School (6-8)
- Normangee Elementary School (Grades PK-5)

In 2009, the school district was rated "academically acceptable" by the Texas Education Agency.
