= Shapira Hotel =

- U.S. National Register of Historic Places
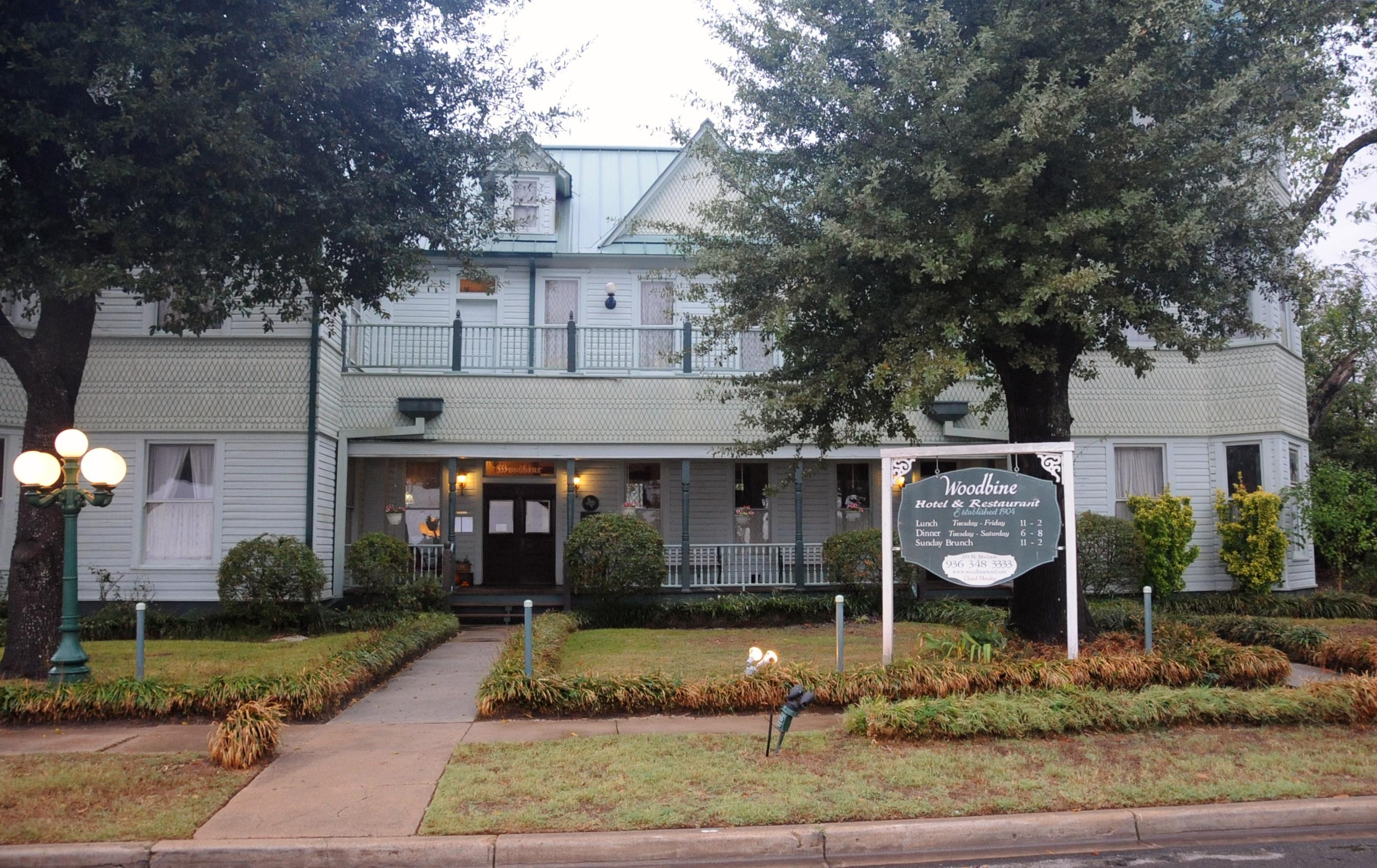

- Location within Texas Location within the United States
- Location: 209 N. Madison St., Madisonville, Texas
- Coordinates: 30°57′01″N 95°54′53″W
- Area: less than one acre
- Built: 1904
- Architectural style: Queen Anne
- NRHP reference No.: 80004140
- Added to NRHP: September 8, 1980

The Shapira Hotel, at 209 N. Madison St. in Madisonville, Texas was built in 1904. It was listed on the National Register of Historic Places in 1980.

It has elements of Queen Anne architecture. It has also been known as Wills Hotel.
