= Old San Antonio Road =

Historic roadway in the U.S. states of Texas and Louisiana

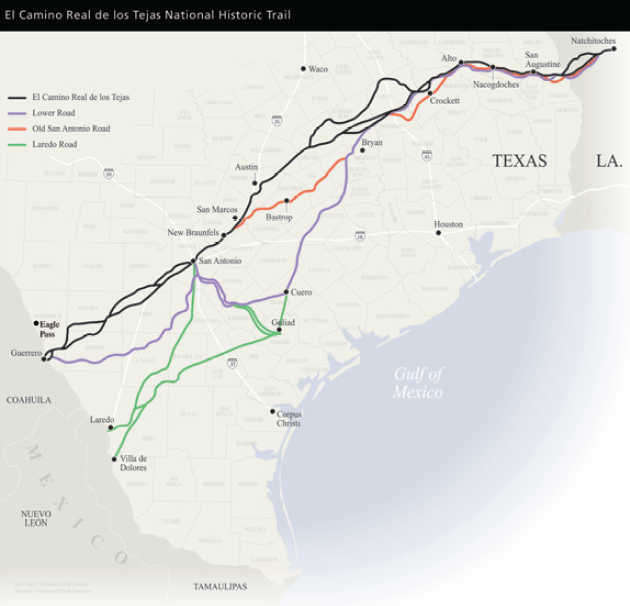

The Old San Antonio Road was a historic roadway located in the U.S. states of Texas and Louisiana. Parts of it were based on traditional Native American trails. Its Texas terminus was about 35 miles (56 km) southeast of Eagle Pass at the Rio Grande in Maverick County, and its northern terminus was at Natchitoches, Louisiana. The road continued from Texas through Monclova to Mexico City.

The Old San Antonio Road is considered a part of El Camino Real de los Tejas National Historic Trail.

== Route ==
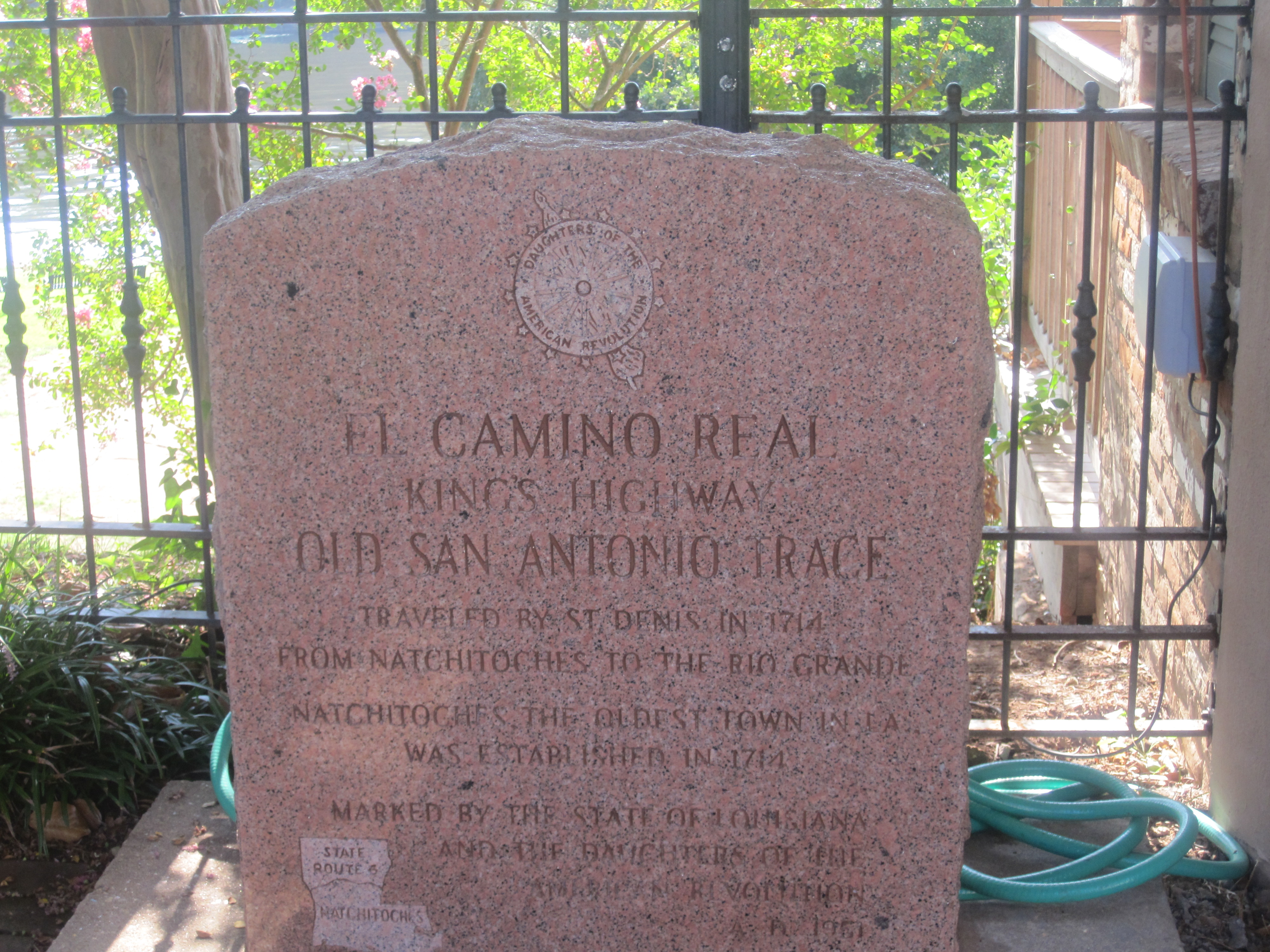
El Camino Real monument in downtown Natchitoches, Louisiana

Louisiana Highway 6 mostly runs alongside the Old San Antonio Road for the entirety of its route through that state from Natchitoches to west of Many. State Highway 21 follows the old road to Midway, Texas, then State Highway OSR (for Old San Antonio Road) follows it around Bryan and College Station, and back to Highway 21 to the eastern outskirts of San Marcos. South of San Marcos, the road follows the Old Bastrop Road until it intersects with I-35. The road leaves the Interstate at New Braunfels and follows Solms road, then Nacogdoches Road, then Mission Road through San Antonio. South of San Antonio, the road follows Old Pleasanton Road, then varying local and county roads and merges with State Highway 97 to Cotulla. The road crosses private property and then follows Farm to Market Road 133 to Catarina. After Catarina, the road is on private property.

== History ==
In 1690, Spanish explorer Alonso de León, following various Indian and buffalo trails, crossed the Rio Grande on his way to East Texas to establish missions, effectively blazing the Old San Antonio Road. In 1691, Domingo Terán de los Ríos took additional missionaries to East Texas following much the same course as traveled by De León. In 1693, Gregorio de Salinas Varona further defined the course of the road while bringing relief supplies from Monclova.

The Old San Antonio Road was not a single road, but a network of trails with different routes at different times. The trail's path was dictated by things as diverse as weather and Native American threats.

During the time that Texas was a Spanish, then Mexican, state, the road was used as a major thoroughfare between Mexico City and East Texas. With Texas independence, however, trade between Mexico and Texas waned, while Mexico's trade with the United States began to increase. The old route from San Antonio to Louisiana, now called the Camino Arriba, was still a vital link for Texans to the United States. During the 1860s, the old road had a brief revival as a supply line from the Texas interior to the Confederacy, and for the flow of cotton to Mexico as a means to circumvent the ever-tightening Union blockade.

After the Civil War, the name Camino Arriba faded and the road was called the Old San Antonio Road. By the 1870s, with the coming of the railroad, the roadway between San Antonio and Mexico had all but disappeared. It was then called the Lower Presidio Road.

=== Preservation ===
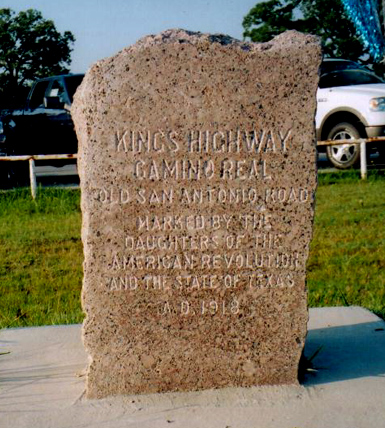
A typical marker placed along the route of the Old San Antonio Road in 1918.

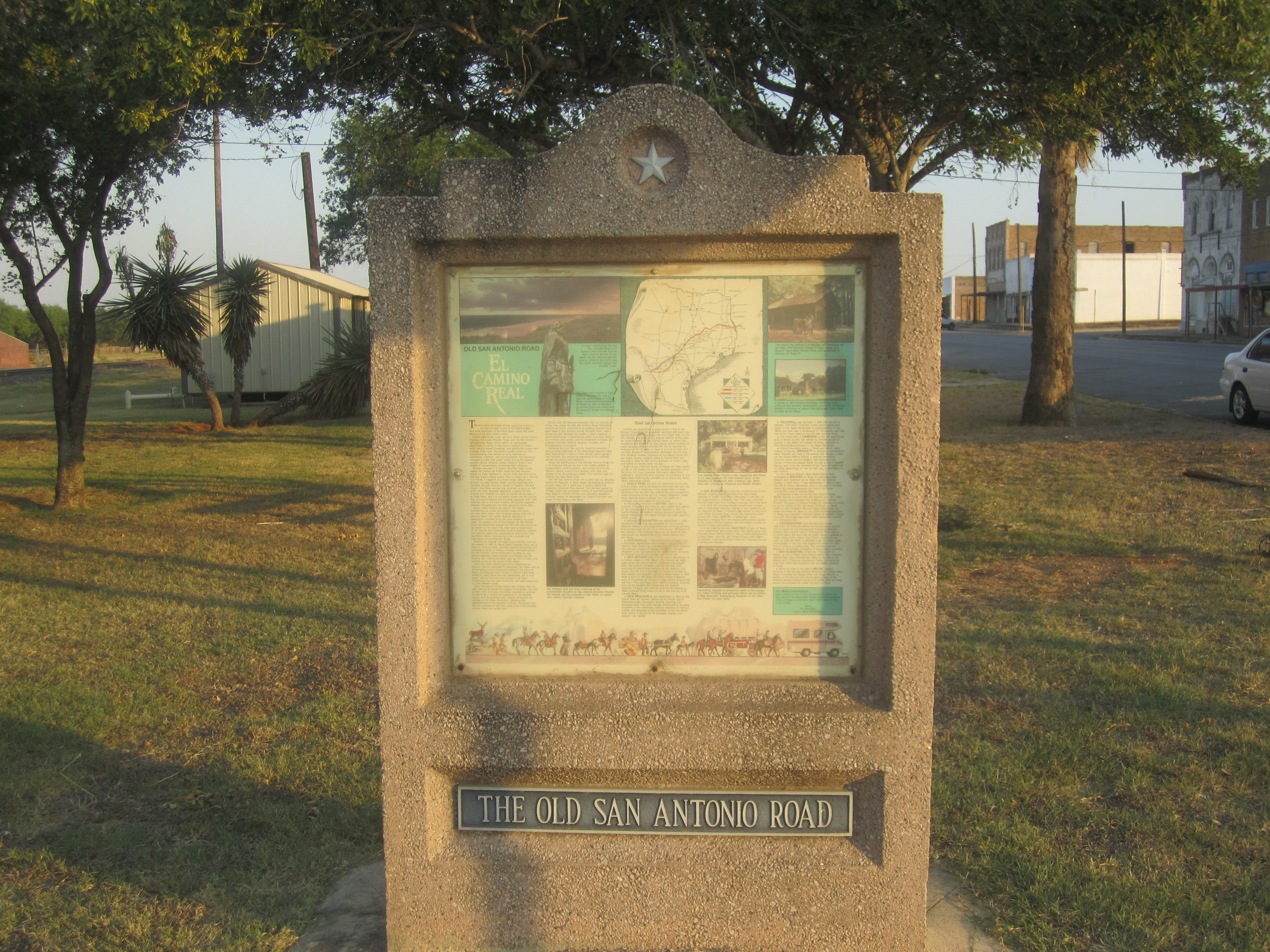
Old San Antonio Road historical marker in Cotulla in La Salle County in south Texas

In 1915, the State of Texas and the Daughters of the American Revolution (DAR) funded a project to place pink granite markers at approximately 5-mile (8.0 km) intervals along the route of the Old San Antonio Road. V.N. Zively, a professional surveyor, mapped the routing in 1915 and 1916 and placed an oak post at each marker site. Inscribed granite markers were installed later, and the Texas DAR presented the markers to the State of Texas in a ceremony in San Antonio on March 2, 1918.

The State of Texas took this routing and marked the remaining county roads as State Highway OSR. Originally, the whole route from the Sabine River to San Marcos carried this designation, but it has since been reduced to a short bypass around Bryan.

As of February 2006, all but nine of the 123 markers were surviving, but many were moved from their original locations as the route of the road was straightened by new highway construction. In deep South Texas, many of the markers are now on private ranches. (See List of Old San Antonio Road DAR Markers.)

In 1929, the Texas legislature designated the Zivley version of the Old San Antonio Road as one of the historic trails of Texas. Later research by the Old San Antonio Road Preservation Commission determined that the Zively route is just one of no fewer than five different main routes that were used at various times.

In 1989, the Texas Legislature created the Old San Antonio Road Preservation Commission to coordinate a yearlong observance in 1991 of the 300th anniversary of the road and encourage tourism along the route. The member agencies of the commission—The Texas Historical Commission, the Texas Department of Transportation, Texas Parks and Wildlife, and the Department of Commerce—promoted the road and constructed a series of information panels to be placed along the route. The commission ceased operations in July, 1993.

On October 18, 2004, President Bush signed a bill designating The El Camino Real de Los Tejas, of which the Old San Antonio Road is part, a National Historic Trail. The Texas Legislature is considering a bill that would give the Texas Historical Commission authority to oversee the development and administration of El Camino Real de los Tejas National Historic Trail in conjunction with the National Park Service.

== Length ==
- Louisiana — 48 Miles
- Texas — 540 Miles

== U.S. cities along the route ==
- Natchitoches, Louisiana
- Many, Louisiana
- Nacogdoches, Texas
- Crockett, Texas
- Caldwell, Texas
- Bastrop, Texas
- San Marcos, Texas
- Midway, Texas
- New Braunfels, Texas
- Normangee, Texas
- San Antonio, Texas
- Benton City, Texas
- Cotulla, Texas
- Uhland, Texas
- Niederwald, Texas

== See also ==
- List of Old San Antonio Road DAR markers
- Spanish Texas
