= Ferguson Unit =

Prison in unincorporated Madison County, Texas, USA

Jim Ferguson Unit
- Location in Texas
- Location: 12120 Savage Drive Midway, Texas 75852; 30°57′31″N 95°42′17″W
- Status: Operational
- Security class: G2-G5, Administrative Segregation, Outside Trusty, Transient
- Capacity: Unit: 2,100 Trusty Camp: 321
- Opened: June 1962
- Managed by: TDCJ Correctional Institutions Division
- Director: Wayne Brewer
- Warden: Richard Gunnels
- Website: www.tdcj.state.tx.us/unit_directory/fe.html

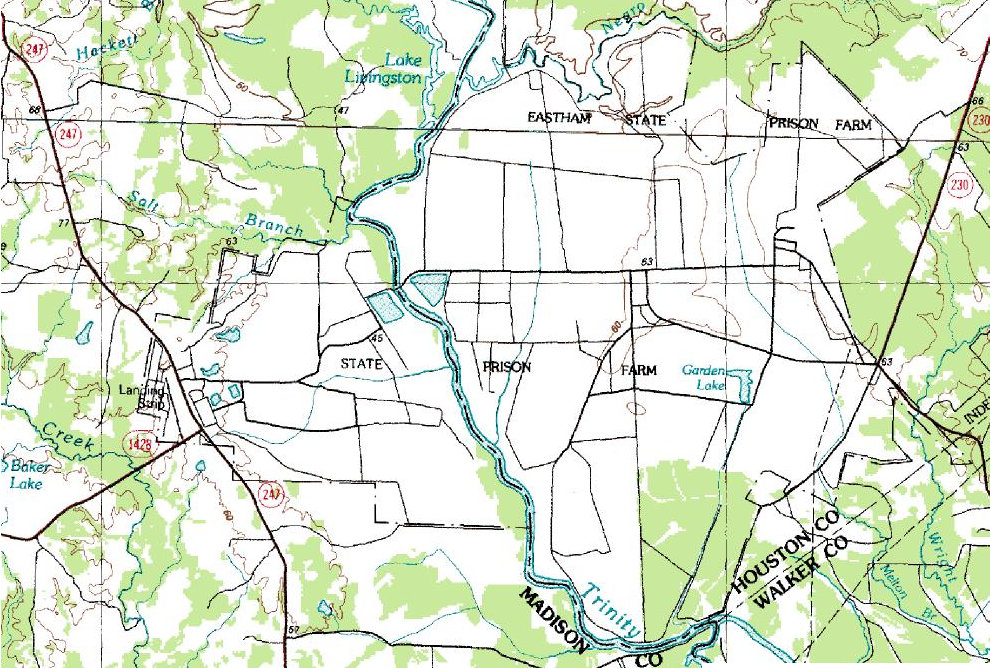
Topographic maps of the Ferguson Unit and the Eastham Unit, July 1, 1983 - U.S. Geological Survey

Jim Ferguson Unit (FE) is a Texas Department of Criminal Justice prison for men located in unincorporated Madison County, Texas. The 4,355-acre (1,762 ha) prison is located on Farm to Market Road 247, near Midway and 20 miles (32 km) northwest of Huntsville.

== History ==
The unit was named after James E. Ferguson, a governor of Texas. In 1935, Ferguson housed white and black prisoners. The current Ferguson Unit opened in June 1962. Jack D. Kyle, the warden of Ferguson, supervised the construction of the current facility, which began in the fall of 1959. The facility was redesignated as a young-offenders unit, for men between the ages of 18 and 25. The first prisoners moved into the facility on March 2, 1962.

In May 1965, the prison had 1,047 prisoners, with a capacity of 1,136 prisoners. As of May 1965, the then 34-year-old Kyle was the youngest warden in the Texas Prison System.

== Demographics ==
In May 1965, while Ferguson was a young-offenders unit, the prison had 1,047 prisoners. About 45% were White, about 29% were Black, and about 26% were Hispanic and Latino. Almost all of the prisoners were between the ages of 17 and 21, with the exception of classroom instructors, shop instructors, and other key prisoner personnel. Prisoners came from all over the state, with various economic levels, urban and rural locations, and troubled and un-troubled upbringings represented.

Bob Johnson of the Houston Post said that the prisoners were "just boys — older boys, perhaps, but still boys." According to Kyle, fewer than 2% of the young male Ferguson prisoners had high school diplomas, almost 20% of the young male prisoners were illiterate, and 83% of them had received below a 9th grade education. At the time, the recidivism rate was 9.3%, compared to the state average of 27% and the national average of 50%.

== Composition ==
The Ferguson unit, a red brick facility, is located in a woodland. In 1965, Bob Johnson of the Houston Post said that Ferguson, "at first glance, looks like it might be a small agricultural college" except that the presence of barbed wire demonstrates that the facility is a prison. Johnson said that Ferguson was "a neat new prison with lots of greenery[...]"

In 1965, the prison, with a capacity of 1,136 prisoners, housed most of its inmates in individual cells. It had 935 individual cells, and two dormitories with 100 prisoners each.

== Notable prisoners ==
- Craig Ahrens, accomplice of the murder of Buddy Musso
- Terence Singleton, accomplice of the murder of Buddy Musso
- Paris Lee Bennett
