= North Zulch Independent School District =

School district in Texas, United States

Address
- 11390 Fifth Street North Zulch, Texas, 77872; United States

District information
- Type: Public
- Grades: PK–12
- Schools: 1
- NCES District ID: 4833030

Students and staff
- Students: 358 (2023–2024)
- Teachers: 30.58 (on an FTE basis) (2023–2024)
- Staff: 31.36 (on an FTE basis) (2023–2024)
- Student–teacher ratio: 11.71 (2023–2024)

Other information
- Website: www.nzisd.org

North Zulch Independent School District is a public school district based in the unincorporated community of North Zulch, Texas (USA).

The district has two campuses –

- North Zulch High School (Grades 6-12)
- North Zulch Elementary (Grades PK-5)

In 2009, the school district was rated "academically acceptable" by the Texas Education Agency.
