= Normangee High School =

Public school in Texas, United States

Location
- 116 Spur 3 Normangee, Texas 77871-0219; United States; 31.026439°N 96.122381°W

Information
- School type: Public high school
- School district: Normangee Independent School District
- Principal: Trae Davis
- Teaching staff: 19.46 (FTE)
- Grades: 9-12
- Enrollment: 185 (2023–2024)
- Student to teacher ratio: 9.51
- Colors: Green, black, and white
- Athletics conference: UIL Class AA
- Mascot: Panther
- Website: Normangee High School website

Normangee High School is a 2A public high school located in Normangee, Texas (USA). It is part of the Normangee Independent School District located in southwest Leon County. In 2011, the school was rated "Academically Acceptable" by the Texas Education Agency.

== Athletics ==
The Normangee Panthers compete in the following sports:

- Baseball
- Basketball
- Football
- Golf
- Powerlifting
- Softball
- Tennis
- Track and Field
- Volleyball

=== State Titles ===
- Boys Basketball -
  - 2004(1A/D1)^

^Also won Texas Cup
