= Normangee, Texas =

Town in Leon and Madison counties in Texas, United States

- Town
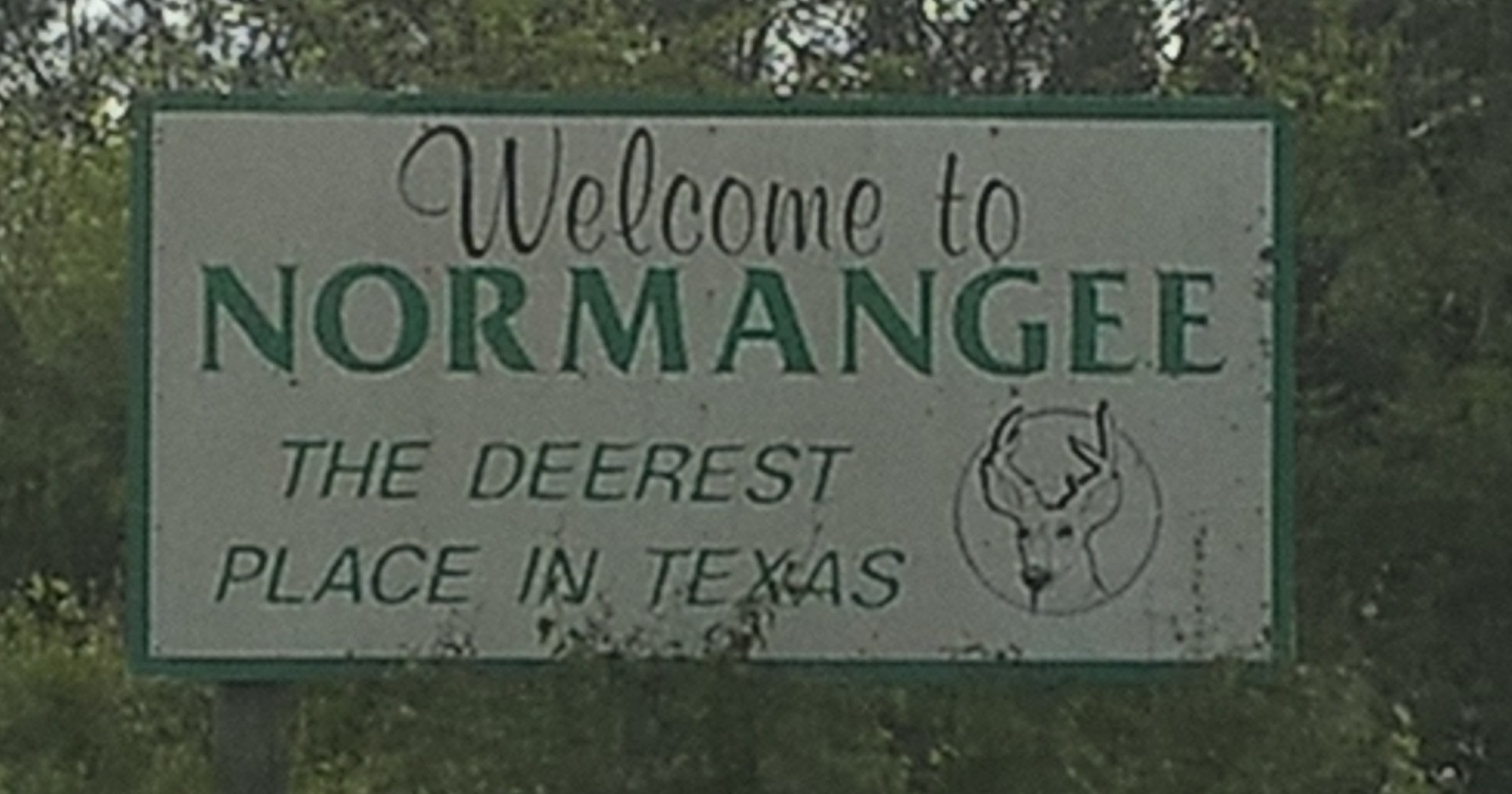
- Normangee welcome sign, March 2016
- Motto: "The Deerest Place in Texas"
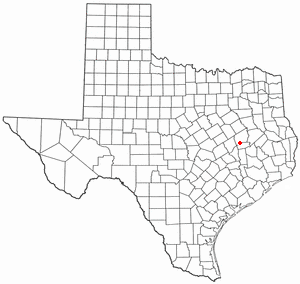
- Location of Normangee, Texas

- Coordinates: 31°01′47″N 96°07′18″W
- Country: United States
- State: Texas
- Counties: Leon, Madison

Area
  - Total: 1.12 sq mi (2.89 km^{2})
  - Land: 1.12 sq mi (2.89 km^{2})
  - Water: 0 sq mi (0.00 km^{2})
- Elevation: 377 ft (115 m)

Population (2020)
  - Total: 495
  - Density: 632.9/sq mi (244.36/km^{2})
- Time zone: UTC-6 (Central (CST))
  - Summer (DST): UTC-5 (CDT)
- ZIP code: 77871
- Area code: 936
- FIPS code: 48-51840
- GNIS feature ID: 2413052

Normangee is a town in Leon and Madison counties in Texas, United States. Its population is 495 as of 2020.

== History ==
The railroads were pushing the frontier westward and the Trinity and Brazos Valley Railway (T&BV) and the Houston and Texas Central Railway (H&TC) were built between Houston and Dallas in 1904–1905, but the railways passed through Robert Rogers' land, approximately two miles west of Rogers Prairie. So on January 26, 1907, S.B. Phillips filed for record a plat of the new town, Normangee, located in the southwestern corner of the Robert Rogers land grant at the junction of the Old San Antonio Road and the two new railroads. When the H&TC was being built through this region, railroad officials placed a town every eight miles. A small community, known as Rogers Prairie, existed two miles east of where the railroad line was built. Norman G. Kittrell was the county judge of Leon County at the time. The railroad named the new town after Judge Kittrell. Since there was already a Norman, Oklahoma, the town renamed itself Normangee.

== Geography ==
According to the United States Census Bureau, the town has a total area of 1.1 square miles (2.9 km^{2}), all land. Normangee is incorporated in Leon County, where most of it lies; only a small part extends into Madison County.

== Demographics ==
Historical population
Census	Pop.	Note	%±
1920	662		—
1930	869		31.3%
1940	535		−38.4%
1950	657		22.8%
1960	718		9.3%
1970	657		−8.5%
1980	636		−3.2%
1990	689		8.3%
2000	719		4.4%
2010	685		−4.7%
2020	495		−27.7%
U.S. Decennial Census

Normangee racial composition as of 2020 (NH = Non-Hispanic) (Note: Note: the US Census treats Hispanic/Latino as an ethnic category. This table excludes Latinos from the racial categories and assigns them to a separate category. Hispanics/Latinos can be of any race.)
Race	Number	Percentage
White (NH)	313	63.23%
Black or African American (NH)	57	11.52%
Native American or Alaska Native (NH)	1	0.2%
Asian (NH)	2	0.4%
Some Other Race (NH)	2	0.4%
Mixed/Multi-Racial (NH)	23	4.65%
Hispanic or Latino	97	19.6%
Total	495	

As of the 2020 United States census, there were 495 people, 315 households, and 249 families residing in the town.

As of the census of 2000, 719 people, 277 households, and 185 families were residing in the town. The population density was 648.0 inhabitants per square mile (250.2/km^{2}). The 358 housing units averaged 322.6 per mi^{2} (124.5/km^{2}). The racial makeup of the town was 73.71% White, 20.45% African American, 0.42% Native American, 0.14% Pacific Islander, 3.48% from other races, and 1.81% from two or more races. Hispanics or Latinos of any race were 8.07% of the population.

Of the 277 households, 35.0% had children under the age of 18 living with them, 43.3% were married couples living together, 19.1% had a female householder with no husband present, and 33.2% were not families. About 28.9% of all households were made up of individuals, and 16.2% had someone living alone who was 65 years of age or older. The average household size was 2.60, and the average family size was 3.22.

In the town, the age distribution was 30.7% under 18, 6.5% from 18 to 24, 28.7% from 25 to 44, 17.9% from 45 to 64, and 16.1% who were 65 or older. The median age was 36 years. For every 100 females, there were 88.2 males. For every 100 females age 18 and over, there were 81.1 males.

The median income for a household in the town was $28,594, and for a family was $34,444. Males had a median income of $29,375 versus $16,042 for females. The per capita income for the town was $18,336. About 16.1% of families and 17.6% of the population were below the poverty line, including 22.2% of those under age 18 and 17.6% of those age 65 or over.

== Education ==
The Town of Normangee is served by the Normangee Independent School District and is home to the Normangee High School Panthers.

== Economy ==
The local economy consists of over 100 small businesses, including banking, groceries and staple goods, antique and thrift stores, health care, and agricultural suppliers.

== Notable people ==
- William Womack Heath, US ambassador to Sweden
- Joseph Jones, former Texas A&M and now professional basketball player
- Lester Roloff, Independent Baptist clergyman from Corpus Christi; died in a private plane crash near Normangee in 1982
- Dr. Billy Charles Covington, an inventor of the non-thermal process for annealing crystalline materials

== See also ==
- List of municipalities in Texas
