= Midway, Texas =

City in Madison County, Texas, United States

- City
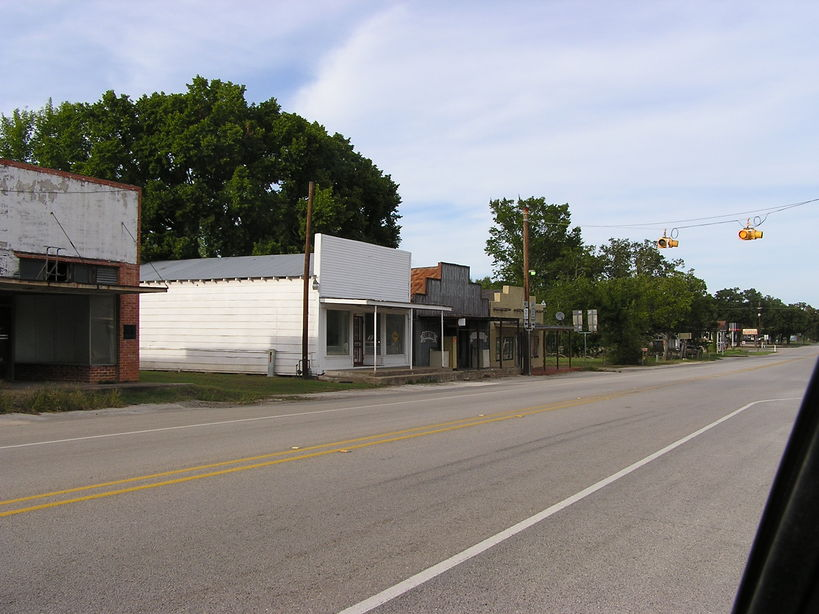
- Downtown Midway, 2010

- Location of Midway, Texas in Madison County

- Location in Texas
- Coordinates: 31°1′23″N 95°45′4″W
- Country: United States
- State: Texas
- County: Madison

Area
  - Total: 1.61 sq mi (4.16 km^{2})
  - Land: 1.59 sq mi (4.11 km^{2})
  - Water: 0.019 sq mi (0.05 km^{2})
- Elevation: 249 ft (76 m)

Population (2020)
  - Total: 173
  - Density: 148.7/sq mi (57.41/km^{2})
- Time zone: UTC-6 (Central (CST))
  - Summer (DST): UTC-5 (CDT)
- ZIP code: 75852
- Area code: 936
- FIPS code: 48-48180
- GNIS feature ID: 1362795
- Website: midway.municipalimpact.com

Midway is a city in northeastern Madison County, Texas, United States, at the junction of the La Bahía Road (now Texas State Highway 21) and the Old San Antonio Road (Texas State Highway OSR). As of the 2020 census, Midway had a population of 173.

Midway was the birthplace of George McJunkin, who was born a slave.

== Geography ==
Midway is located at 31°1′23″N 95°45′4″W (31.023176, –95.751081). According to the United States Census Bureau, the city has a total area of 1.6 square miles (4.1 km^{2}), all land.

== Demographics ==
Historical population
Census	Pop.	Note	%±
1880	100		—
1990	274		—
2000	288		5.1%
2010	228		−20.8%
2020	173		−24.1%
U.S. Decennial Census

=== 2020 census ===
As of the 2020 census, Midway had a population of 173. The median age was 48.9 years. 19.1% of residents were under the age of 18 and 17.3% of residents were 65 years of age or older. For every 100 females there were 111.0 males, and for every 100 females age 18 and over there were 105.9 males age 18 and over.

0.0% of residents lived in urban areas, while 100.0% lived in rural areas.

There were 81 households in Midway, of which 40.7% had children under the age of 18 living in them. Of all households, 43.2% were married-couple households, 28.4% were households with a male householder and no spouse or partner present, and 24.7% were households with a female householder and no spouse or partner present. About 25.9% of all households were made up of individuals and 9.9% had someone living alone who was 65 years of age or older.

There were 109 housing units, of which 25.7% were vacant. The homeowner vacancy rate was 1.7% and the rental vacancy rate was 8.0%.

Racial composition as of the 2020 census
Race	Number	Percent
White	128	74.0%
Black or African American	23	13.3%
American Indian and Alaska Native	4	2.3%
Asian	0	0.0%
Native Hawaiian and Other Pacific Islander	0	0.0%
Some other race	7	4.0%
Two or more races	11	6.4%
Hispanic or Latino (of any race)	18	10.4%

=== 2000 census ===
As of the census of 2000, 288 people, 120 households, and 86 families resided in the city. The population density was 179.6 inhabitants per square mile (69.3/km^{2}). The 151 housing units averaged 94.2 per square mile (36.4/km^{2}). The racial makeup of the city was 80.90% White, 15.97% African American, 0.35% Native American, 1.39% from other races, and 1.39% from two or more races. Hispanics or Latinos of any race were 5.21% of the population.

Of the 120 households, 29.2% had children under the age of 18 living with them, 52.5% were married couples living together, 13.3% had a female householder with no husband present, and 28.3% were not families; 25.0% of all households were made up of individuals, and 14.2% had someone living alone who was 65 years of age or older. The average household size was 2.40 and the average family size was 2.83.

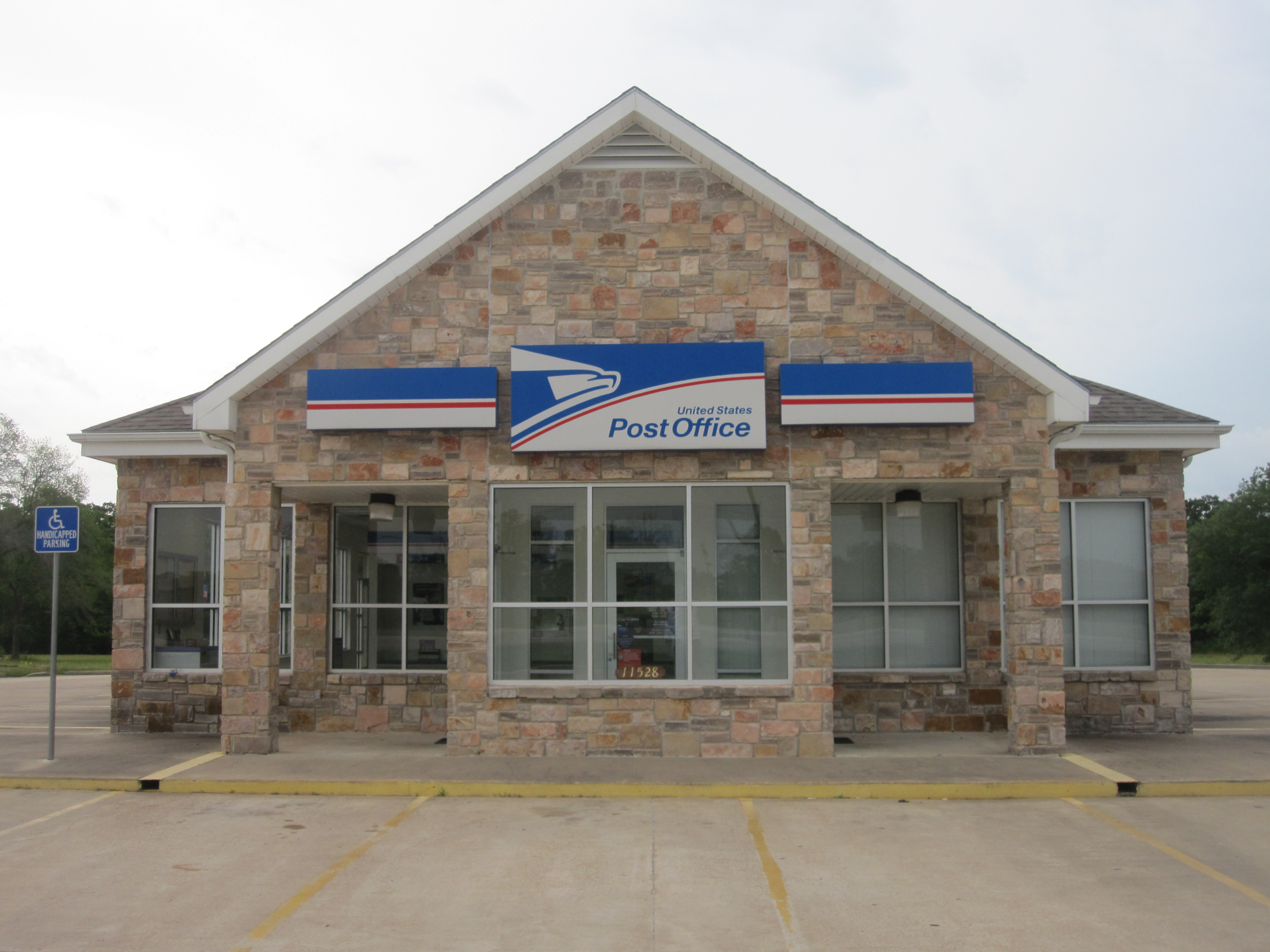
Midway Post Office, May 2010

In the city, the population was distributed as 24.0% under the age of 18, 10.8% from 18 to 24, 23.6% from 25 to 44, 22.2% from 45 to 64, and 19.4% who were 65 years of age or older. The median age was 39 years. For every 100 females, there were 78.9 males. For every 100 females age 18 and over, there were 79.5 males.

The median income for a household in the city was $36,875, and for a family was $39,167. Males had a median income of $24,145 versus $24,375 for females. The per capita income for the city was $17,824. About 6.8% of families and 8.5% of the population were below the poverty line, including 3.7% of those under the age of 18 and 28.9% of those 65 or over.

== Government ==
The Ferguson Unit, a Texas Department of Criminal Justice prison for men, is located in unincorporated Madison County, near Midway.

== Climate ==
The climate in this area is characterized by hot, humid summers and generally mild to cool winters. According to the Köppen climate classification system, Midway has a humid subtropical climate, Cfa on climate maps.

== See also ==
- List of municipalities in Texas
