= Madison County, Texas =

County in Texas, United States

- County
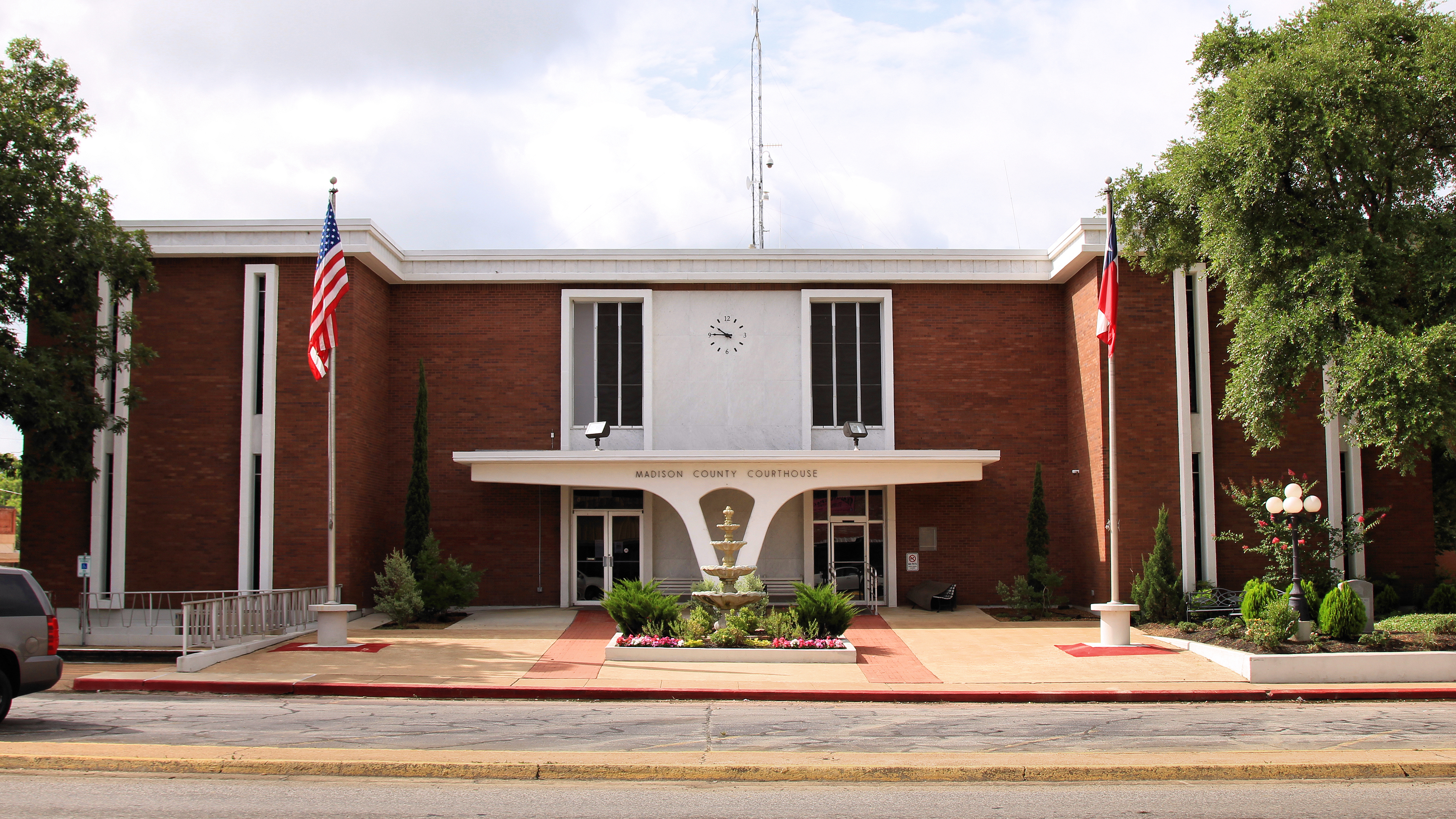
- The Madison County Courthouse in Madisonville

- Location within the U.S. state of Texas
- Coordinates: 30°58′N 95°56′W
- Country: United States
- State: Texas
- Founded: 1854
- Named for: James Madison
- Seat: Madisonville
- Largest city: Madisonville

Area
  - Total: 472 sq mi (1,220 km^{2})
  - Land: 466 sq mi (1,210 km^{2})
  - Water: 6.4 sq mi (17 km^{2}) 1.3%

Population (2020)
  - Total: 13,455
  - Estimate (2025): 14,226 ▲
  - Density: 28.9/sq mi (11.1/km^{2})
- Time zone: UTC−6 (Central)
  - Summer (DST): UTC−5 (CDT)
- Congressional district: 10th
- Website: www.co.madison.tx.us

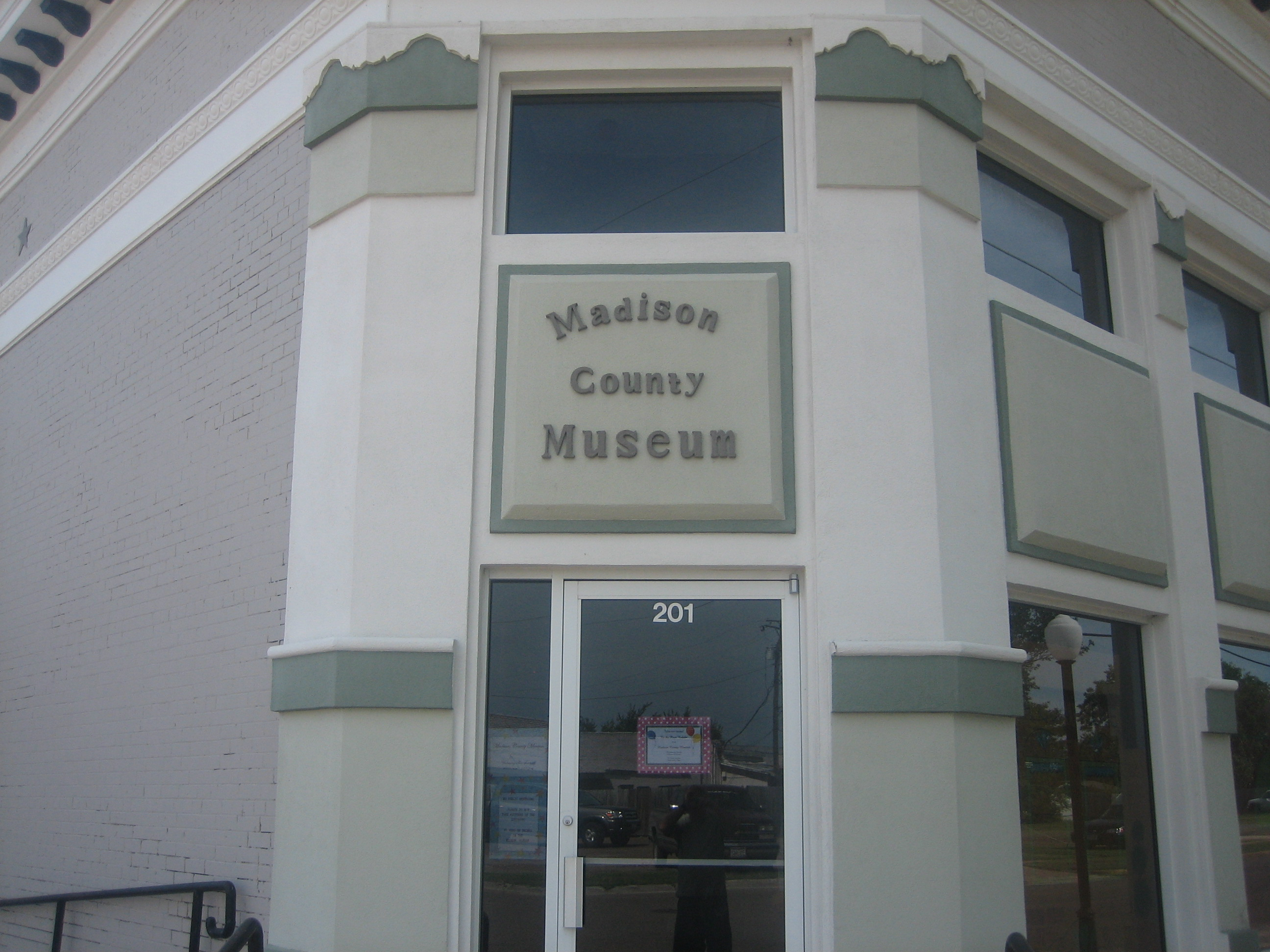
The Madison County Museum in Madisonville

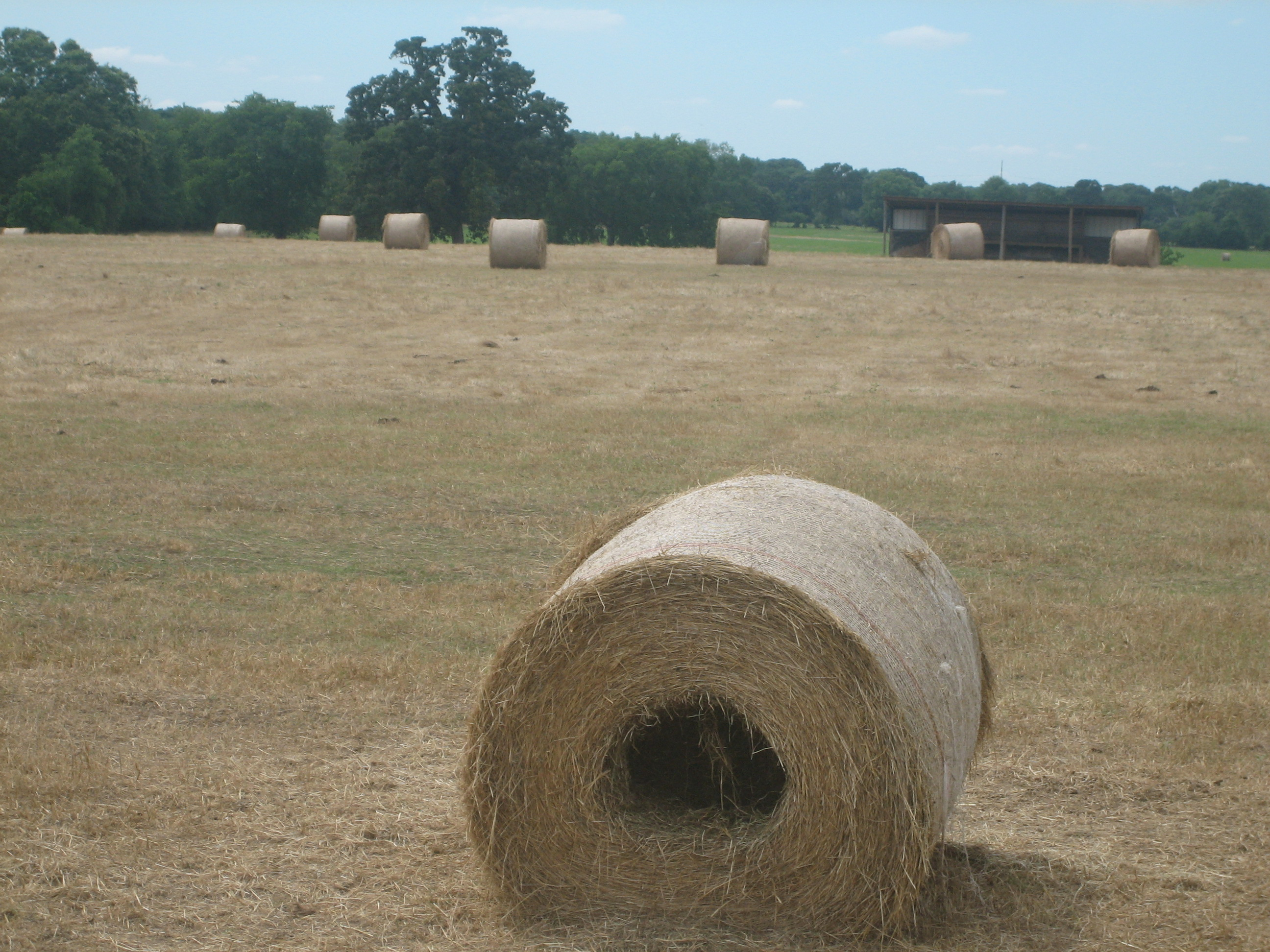
Bales of rolled hay off Texas State Highway 21 east of Madisonville

Madison County is a county located in the U.S. state of Texas. As of the 2020 census, its population was 13,455. Its seat is Madisonville. The county was created in 1853 and organized the next year. It is named for James Madison, the fourth President of the United States. In 1852, Hillary Mercer Crabb was elected to serve the unexpired term of State Representative F. L. Hatch. Among Crabb's accomplishments as a legislator was the introduction of a bill to create Madison County.

== History ==
The current Madison County Courthouse was built in 1970. It is at least the fifth courthouse to serve Madison County. Hillary Mercer Crabb also served as a justice of the peace and chief justice (county judge). In 1852 he was elected to serve the unexpired term of State Representative F. L. Hatch. Among Crabb's accomplishments as a legislator was the introduction of a bill to create Madison County.

== Geography ==
According to the U.S. Census Bureau, the county has a total area of 472 square miles (1,220 km^{2}), of which 466 square miles (1,210 km^{2}) are land and 6.4 square miles (17 km^{2}) (1.3%) are covered by water.

The county has three natural borders; its eastern boundary is defined by the Trinity River, its western boundary is defined by the Navasota River, and the portion of its southern border adjacent to Walker County is defined by Bedias Creek.

=== Major highways ===
- Interstate 45
- U.S. Highway 190
- State Highway 21
- State Highway 75
- State Highway 90
- State Highway OSR
- Loop 160
- Loop 1853
- Spur 67
- Spur 104
- Spur 174

=== Notes ===
1. Loop 1853 will be a relief route for SH 21.

=== Adjacent counties ===
- Leon County (north)
- Houston County (northeast)
- Walker County (southeast)
- Grimes County (south)
- Brazos County (west)

== Demographics ==
Historical population
Census	Pop.	Note	%±
1860	2,238		—
1870	4,061		81.5%
1880	5,395		32.8%
1890	8,512		57.8%
1900	10,432		22.6%
1910	10,318		−1.1%
1920	11,956		15.9%
1930	12,227		2.3%
1940	12,029		−1.6%
1950	7,996		−33.5%
1960	6,749		−15.6%
1970	7,693		14.0%
1980	10,649		38.4%
1990	10,931		2.6%
2000	12,940		18.4%
2010	13,664		5.6%
2020	13,455		−1.5%
2025 (est.)	14,226	▲	5.7%
U.S. Decennial Census; 1850–2010 2010 2020

=== Racial and ethnic composition ===
Madison County, Texas – Racial and ethnic composition Note: the US Census treats Hispanic/Latino as an ethnic category. This table excludes Latinos from the racial categories and assigns them to a separate category. Hispanics/Latinos may be of any race.
Race / Ethnicity (NH = Non-Hispanic)	Pop 1980	Pop 1990	Pop 2000	Pop 2010	Pop 2020	% 1980	% 1990	% 2000	% 2010	% 2020
White alone (NH)	7,168	7,127	7,801	8,030	6,984	67.31%	65.20%	60.29%	58.77%	51.91%
Black or African American alone (NH)	2,608	2,547	2,915	2,687	2,587	24.49%	23.30%	22.53%	19.66%	19.23%
Native American or Alaska Native alone (NH)	30	54	30	32	48	0.28%	0.49%	0.23%	0.23%	0.36%
Asian alone (NH)	27	12	50	77	101	0.25%	0.11%	0.39%	0.56%	0.75%
Native Hawaiian or Pacific Islander alone (NH)	x	x	3	1	0	x	x	0.02%	0.01%	0.00%
Other race alone (NH)	14	13	5	4	11	0.13%	0.12%	0.04%	0.03%	0.08%
Mixed race or Multiracial (NH)	x	x	94	145	309	x	x	0.73%	1.06%	2.30%
Hispanic or Latino (any race)	802	1,178	2,042	2,688	3,415	7.53%	10.78%	15.78%	19.67%	25.38%
Total	10,649	10,931	12,940	13,664	13,455	100.00%	100.00%	100.00%	100.00%	100.00%

=== 2020 census ===
As of the 2020 census, the county had a population of 13,455. The median age was 36.5 years. 20.5% of residents were under the age of 18 and 16.4% of residents were 65 years of age or older. For every 100 females there were 133.0 males, and for every 100 females age 18 and over there were 143.8 males age 18 and over.

The racial makeup of the county was 57.2% White, 19.4% Black or African American, 0.8% American Indian and Alaska Native, 0.8% Asian, <0.1% Native Hawaiian and Pacific Islander, 14.8% from some other race, and 7.0% from two or more races. Hispanic or Latino residents of any race comprised 25.4% of the population.

<0.1% of residents lived in urban areas, while 100.0% lived in rural areas.

There were 4,166 households in the county, of which 35.1% had children under the age of 18 living in them. Of all households, 51.0% were married-couple households, 16.6% were households with a male householder and no spouse or partner present, and 27.9% were households with a female householder and no spouse or partner present. About 24.1% of all households were made up of individuals and 12.6% had someone living alone who was 65 years of age or older.

There were 5,054 housing units, of which 17.6% were vacant. Among occupied housing units, 74.4% were owner-occupied and 25.6% were renter-occupied. The homeowner vacancy rate was 1.8% and the rental vacancy rate was 10.5%.

=== 2000 census ===
As of the census of 2000, 12,940 people, 3,914 households, and 2,837 families were residing in the county. The population density was 28 people per square mile (11 people/km^{2}). The 4,797 housing units average density 10/mi^{2} (3.9/km^{2}). The racial makeup of the county was 66.79% White, 22.87% African American, 0.32% Native American, 0.39% Asian, 7.93% from other races, and 1.72% from two or more races. About 15.78% of the population were Hispanic or Latino of any race.

Of the 3,914 households, 31.50% had children under the age of 18 living with them, 57.10% were married couples living together, 11.70% had a female householder with no husband present, and 27.50% were not families. About 24.50% of all households were made up of individuals, and 12.40% had someone living alone who was 65 years of age or older. The average household size was 2.57, and the average family size was 3.05.

In the county, the age distribution was 21.10% under 18, 13.00% from 18 to 24, 31.90% from 25 to 44, 20.00% from 45 to 64, and 14.00% who were 65 or older. The median age was 33 years. For every 100 females there were 142.60 males. For every 100 females age 18 and over, there were 155.10 males.

The median income for a household in the county was $29,418, and for a family was $35,779. Males had a median income of $25,625 versus $19,777 for females. The per capita income for the county was $14,056. About 12.30% of families and 15.80% of the population were below the poverty line, including 20.00% of those under age 18 and 16.30% of those age 65 or over.

== Government and infrastructure ==
The Ferguson Unit, a Texas Department of Criminal Justice prison for men, is located in an unincorporated area in the county.

=== Politics ===
United States presidential election results for Madison County, Texas
Year	Republican		Democratic		Third party(ies)	
Year	No.	%	No.	%	No.	%
1912	37	7.55%	379	77.35%	74	15.10%
1916	120	13.38%	730	81.38%	47	5.24%
1920	63	5.60%	650	57.73%	413	36.68%
1924	146	8.38%	1,592	91.34%	5	0.29%
1928	364	44.61%	452	55.39%	0	0.00%
1932	20	1.47%	1,344	98.53%	0	0.00%
1936	45	3.84%	1,127	96.16%	0	0.00%
1940	127	8.14%	1,434	91.86%	0	0.00%
1944	65	4.97%	1,115	85.31%	127	9.72%
1948	134	11.82%	801	70.63%	199	17.55%
1952	692	37.53%	1,152	62.47%	0	0.00%
1956	733	50.27%	713	48.90%	12	0.82%
1960	607	39.11%	909	58.57%	36	2.32%
1964	644	33.11%	1,298	66.74%	3	0.15%
1968	608	25.69%	994	41.99%	765	32.32%
1972	1,540	73.30%	561	26.70%	0	0.00%
1976	1,062	35.87%	1,885	63.66%	14	0.47%
1980	1,389	46.02%	1,583	52.45%	46	1.52%
1984	2,158	60.74%	1,384	38.95%	11	0.31%
1988	1,896	50.60%	1,835	48.97%	16	0.43%
1992	1,544	39.76%	1,553	39.99%	786	20.24%
1996	1,576	47.03%	1,470	43.87%	305	9.10%
2000	2,333	64.39%	1,241	34.25%	49	1.35%
2004	2,837	69.18%	1,235	30.11%	29	0.71%
2008	2,891	70.96%	1,146	28.13%	37	0.91%
2012	3,028	75.17%	967	24.01%	33	0.82%
2016	3,351	78.13%	881	20.54%	57	1.33%
2020	4,169	78.69%	1,088	20.54%	41	0.77%
2024	4,498	81.95%	964	17.56%	27	0.49%

United States Senate election results for Madison County, Texas1
Year	Republican		Democratic		Third party(ies)	
Year	No.	%	No.	%	No.	%
2024	4,336	79.66%	1,012	18.59%	95	1.75%

United States Senate election results for Madison County, Texas2
Year	Republican		Democratic		Third party(ies)	
Year	No.	%	No.	%	No.	%
2020	4,118	78.84%	1,030	19.72%	75	1.44%

Texas Gubernatorial election results for Madison County
Year	Republican		Democratic		Third party(ies)	
Year	No.	%	No.	%	No.	%
2022	3,272	83.75%	595	15.23%	40	1.02%

== Communities ==
=== Cities ===
- Madisonville (county seat)
- Midway

=== Town ===
- Normangee (mostly in Leon County)

=== Unincorporated community ===
- North Zulch

== Education ==
School districts:

- Madisonville Consolidated Independent School District
- Normangee Independent School District
- North Zulch Independent School District

Blinn College is the designated community college for all of the county.

== See also ==
- National Register of Historic Places listings in Madison County, Texas
- Recorded Texas Historic Landmarks in Madison County
