= Madisonville, Texas =

City in and county seat of Madison County, Texas, United States

Madisonville
- City
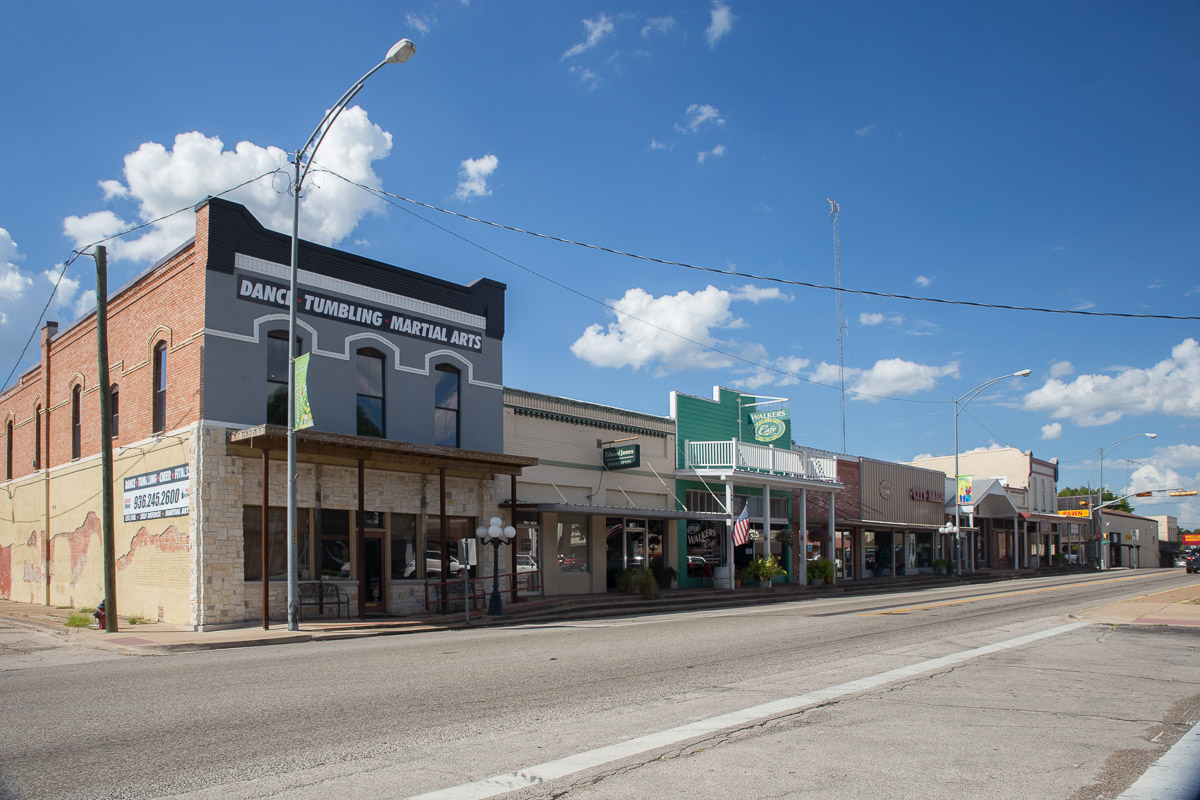
- Downtown Madisonville, June 2020
- Nickname: Madville
- Location of Madisonville, Texas
- Coordinates: 30°57′3″N 95°54′45″W
- Country: United States
- State: Texas
- County: Madison

Area
  - Total: 4.32 sq mi (11.20 km^{2})
  - Land: 4.18 sq mi (10.82 km^{2})
  - Water: 0.15 sq mi (0.38 km^{2})
- Elevation: 249 ft (76 m)

Population (2020)
  - Total: 4,420
  - Density: 1,121.2/sq mi (432.91/km^{2})
- Time zone: UTC-6 (Central (CST))
  - Summer (DST): UTC-5 (CDT)
- ZIP code: 77864
- Area code: 936
- FIPS code: 48-45996
- GNIS feature ID: 1362063
- Website: City website

Madisonville is a city in and the county seat of Madison County, Texas, United States. The population was 4,420 at the 2020 census. Both the City of Madisonville and the County of Madison were named for U.S. President James Madison, the fourth chief executive.

== History ==
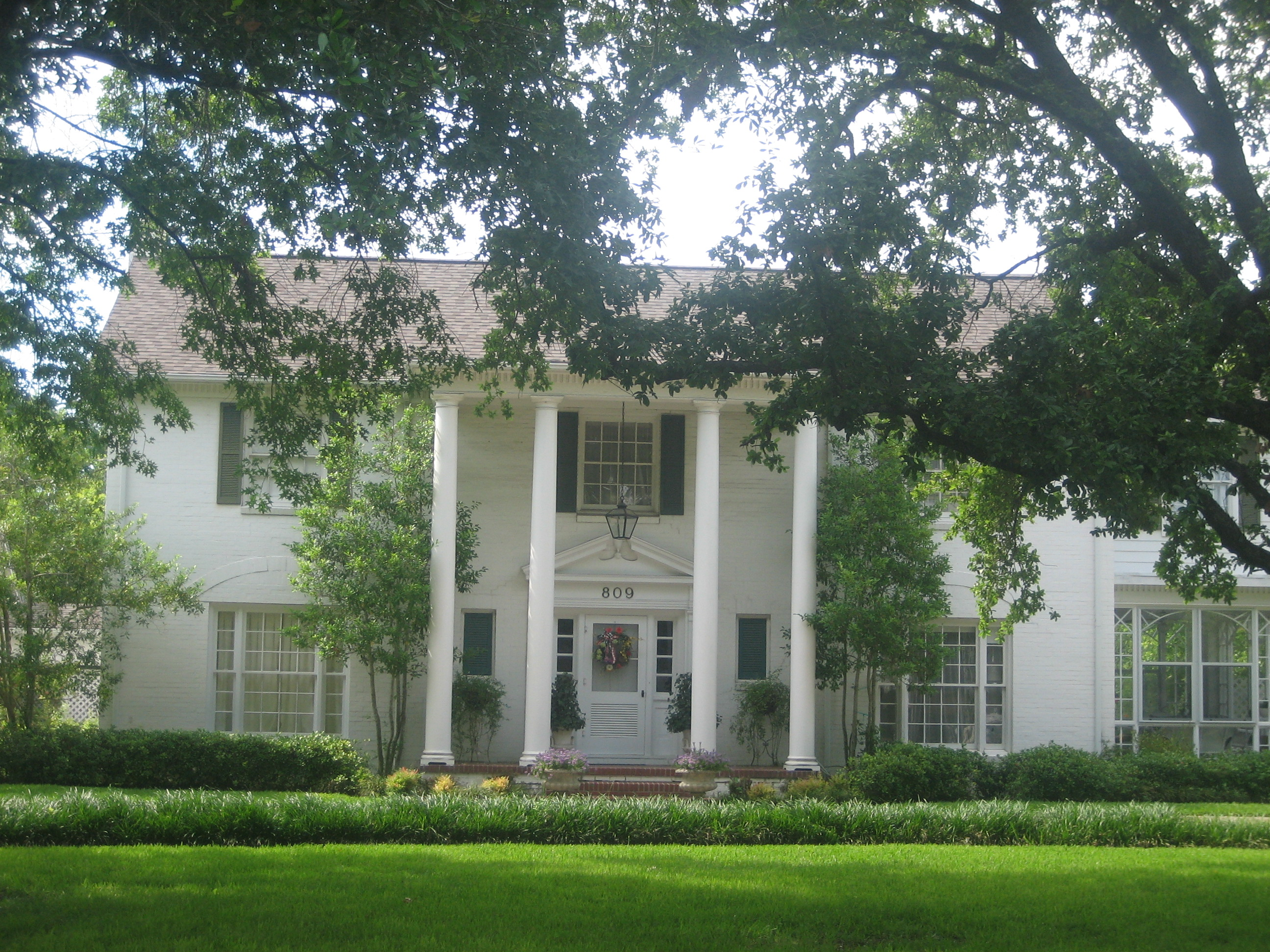
A historic plantation-style home in Madisonville (2009)

The town of Madisonville was founded in 1853, as the county seat of the at the time newly organized Madison County. Lots were sold in the summer of the same year, on a 200-acre tract of land donated by Job Starks Collard. At the suggestion of Pleasant Williams Kittrell, the town was named after President James Madison.

Hillary Mercer Crabb served as a justice of the peace and chief justice (county judge). In 1852 he was elected to serve the unexpired term of State Representative F. L. Hatch. Among Crabb's accomplishments as a legislator was the introduction of a bill to create Madison County.

== Geography ==
Madisonville is located at 30°57′3″N 95°54′45″W (30.950915, –95.912623).

According to the United States Census Bureau, the city has a total area of 4.3 square miles (11 km^{2}), of which 4.2 square miles (11 km^{2}) is land and 0.2 square miles (0.52 km^{2}) (3.49%) is water.

=== Climate ===
The climate in this area is characterized by hot, humid summers and generally mild to cool winters. According to the Köppen Climate Classification system, Madisonville has a humid subtropical climate, abbreviated "Cfa" on climate maps.

Climate data for Madisonville, Texas (1991–2020 normals, extremes 1942–present)
| Month | Jan | Feb | Mar | Apr | May | Jun | Jul | Aug | Sep | Oct | Nov | Dec | Year |
|---|---|---|---|---|---|---|---|---|---|---|---|---|---|
| Record high °F (°C) | 90 (32) | 94 (34) | 96 (36) | 95 (35) | 100 (38) | 105 (41) | 110 (43) | 109 (43) | 112 (44) | 99 (37) | 91 (33) | 86 (30) | 112 (44) |
| Mean maximum °F (°C) | 77.7 (25.4) | 80.6 (27.0) | 84.7 (29.3) | 88.1 (31.2) | 92.7 (33.7) | 96.8 (36.0) | 100.2 (37.9) | 101.8 (38.8) | 98.3 (36.8) | 92.4 (33.6) | 84.0 (28.9) | 79.4 (26.3) | 103.0 (39.4) |
| Mean daily maximum °F (°C) | 61.8 (16.6) | 65.7 (18.7) | 72.4 (22.4) | 79.1 (26.2) | 85.4 (29.7) | 91.5 (33.1) | 94.7 (34.8) | 96.1 (35.6) | 91.0 (32.8) | 82.1 (27.8) | 71.1 (21.7) | 63.6 (17.6) | 79.5 (26.4) |
| Daily mean °F (°C) | 49.2 (9.6) | 53.2 (11.8) | 59.7 (15.4) | 66.5 (19.2) | 74.0 (23.3) | 80.3 (26.8) | 83.1 (28.4) | 83.6 (28.7) | 78.2 (25.7) | 68.5 (20.3) | 57.9 (14.4) | 50.8 (10.4) | 67.1 (19.5) |
| Mean daily minimum °F (°C) | 36.6 (2.6) | 40.7 (4.8) | 47.0 (8.3) | 53.9 (12.2) | 62.6 (17.0) | 69.2 (20.7) | 71.6 (22.0) | 71.2 (21.8) | 65.4 (18.6) | 54.9 (12.7) | 44.7 (7.1) | 37.9 (3.3) | 54.6 (12.6) |
| Mean minimum °F (°C) | 21.8 (−5.7) | 26.1 (−3.3) | 29.9 (−1.2) | 37.7 (3.2) | 48.8 (9.3) | 61.6 (16.4) | 67.3 (19.6) | 65.5 (18.6) | 52.6 (11.4) | 38.1 (3.4) | 28.0 (−2.2) | 24.0 (−4.4) | 19.5 (−6.9) |
| Record low °F (°C) | −2 (−19) | 1 (−17) | 17 (−8) | 28 (−2) | 36 (2) | 51 (11) | 55 (13) | 53 (12) | 40 (4) | 21 (−6) | 18 (−8) | 3 (−16) | −2 (−19) |
| Average precipitation inches (mm) | 4.36 (111) | 3.35 (85) | 3.38 (86) | 3.40 (86) | 4.86 (123) | 3.76 (96) | 2.91 (74) | 3.42 (87) | 3.87 (98) | 4.72 (120) | 4.34 (110) | 4.40 (112) | 46.77 (1,188) |
| Average snowfall inches (cm) | 0.0 (0.0) | 0.3 (0.76) | 0.0 (0.0) | 0.0 (0.0) | 0.0 (0.0) | 0.0 (0.0) | 0.0 (0.0) | 0.0 (0.0) | 0.0 (0.0) | 0.0 (0.0) | 0.0 (0.0) | 0.2 (0.51) | 0.5 (1.3) |
| Average precipitation days (≥ 0.01 in) | 7.6 | 7.7 | 6.8 | 5.8 | 7.0 | 6.9 | 5.7 | 5.3 | 6.2 | 5.9 | 6.6 | 7.6 | 79.1 |
| Average snowy days (≥ 0.1 in) | 0.0 | 0.1 | 0.0 | 0.0 | 0.0 | 0.0 | 0.0 | 0.0 | 0.0 | 0.0 | 0.0 | 0.1 | 0.2 |
Source: NOAA

== Demographics ==
Historical population
| Census | Pop. | Note | %± |
|---|---|---|---|
| 1850 | 118 | | — |
| 1870 | 98 | | — |
| 1890 | 418 | | — |
| 1920 | 1,079 | | — |
| 1930 | 1,294 | | 19.9% |
| 1940 | 2,095 | | 61.9% |
| 1950 | 2,393 | | 14.2% |
| 1960 | 2,324 | | −2.9% |
| 1970 | 2,881 | | 24.0% |
| 1980 | 3,660 | | 27.0% |
| 1990 | 3,569 | | −2.5% |
| 2000 | 4,159 | | 16.5% |
| 2010 | 4,396 | | 5.7% |
| 2020 | 4,420 | | 0.5% |
U.S. Decennial Census

=== Racial and ethnic composition ===
Racial composition as of the 2020 census
| Race | Number | Percent |
|---|---|---|
| White | 1,778 | 40.2% |
| Black or African American | 1,236 | 28.0% |
| American Indian and Alaska Native | 44 | 1.0% |
| Asian | 26 | 0.6% |
| Native Hawaiian and Other Pacific Islander | 1 | 0.0% |
| Some other race | 832 | 18.8% |
| Two or more races | 503 | 11.4% |
| Hispanic or Latino (of any race) | 1,721 | 38.9% |

=== 2020 census ===
As of the 2020 census, Madisonville had a population of 4,420, 1,497 households, and 1,065 families residing in the city. The median age was 33.4 years, with 29.0% of residents under the age of 18 and 15.1% aged 65 or older. For every 100 females there were 87.6 males, and for every 100 females age 18 and over there were 82.8 males.

There were 1,497 households in Madisonville, of which 42.4% had children under the age of 18 living in them. Of all households, 42.0% were married-couple households, 15.4% were households with a male householder and no spouse or partner present, and 36.5% were households with a female householder and no spouse or partner present. About 25.7% of all households were made up of individuals and 13.5% had someone living alone who was 65 years of age or older.

There were 1,707 housing units, of which 12.3% were vacant. The homeowner vacancy rate was 2.7% and the rental vacancy rate was 7.9%.

0.0% of residents lived in urban areas, while 100.0% lived in rural areas.

=== 2000 census ===
At the 2000 census there were 4,159 people, 1,473 households, and 1,016 families living in the city. The population density was 1,003.3 inhabitants per square mile (387.4/km^{2}). There were 1,653 housing units at an average density of 398.7 per square mile (153.9/km^{2}). The racial makeup of the city was 56.60% White, 29.21% African American, 0.50% Native American, 0.41% Asian, 0.02% Pacific Islander, 10.56% from other races, and 2.69% from two or more races. Hispanic or Latino of any race were 22.24%.

Of the 1,473 households 35.6% had children under the age of 18 living with them, 46.1% were married couples living together, 17.7% had a female householder with no husband present, and 31.0% were non-families. 26.8% of households were one person and 13.2% were one person aged 65 or older. The average household size was 2.70 and the average family size was 3.28.

The age distribution was 29.7% under the age of 18, 10.1% from 18 to 24, 25.2% from 25 to 44, 18.2% from 45 to 64, and 16.8% 65 or older. The median age was 33 years. For every 100 females, there were 88.7 males. For every 100 females age 18 and over, there were 82.3 males.

The median household income was $25,440 and the median family income was $29,077. Males had a median income of $22,292 versus $19,885 for females. The per capita income for the city was $12,551. About 20.7% of families and 23.2% of the population were below the poverty line, including 31.1% of those under age 18 and 17.0% of those age 65 or over.

== Education ==
The City of Madisonville is served by the Madisonville Consolidated Independent School District.

== Gallery ==
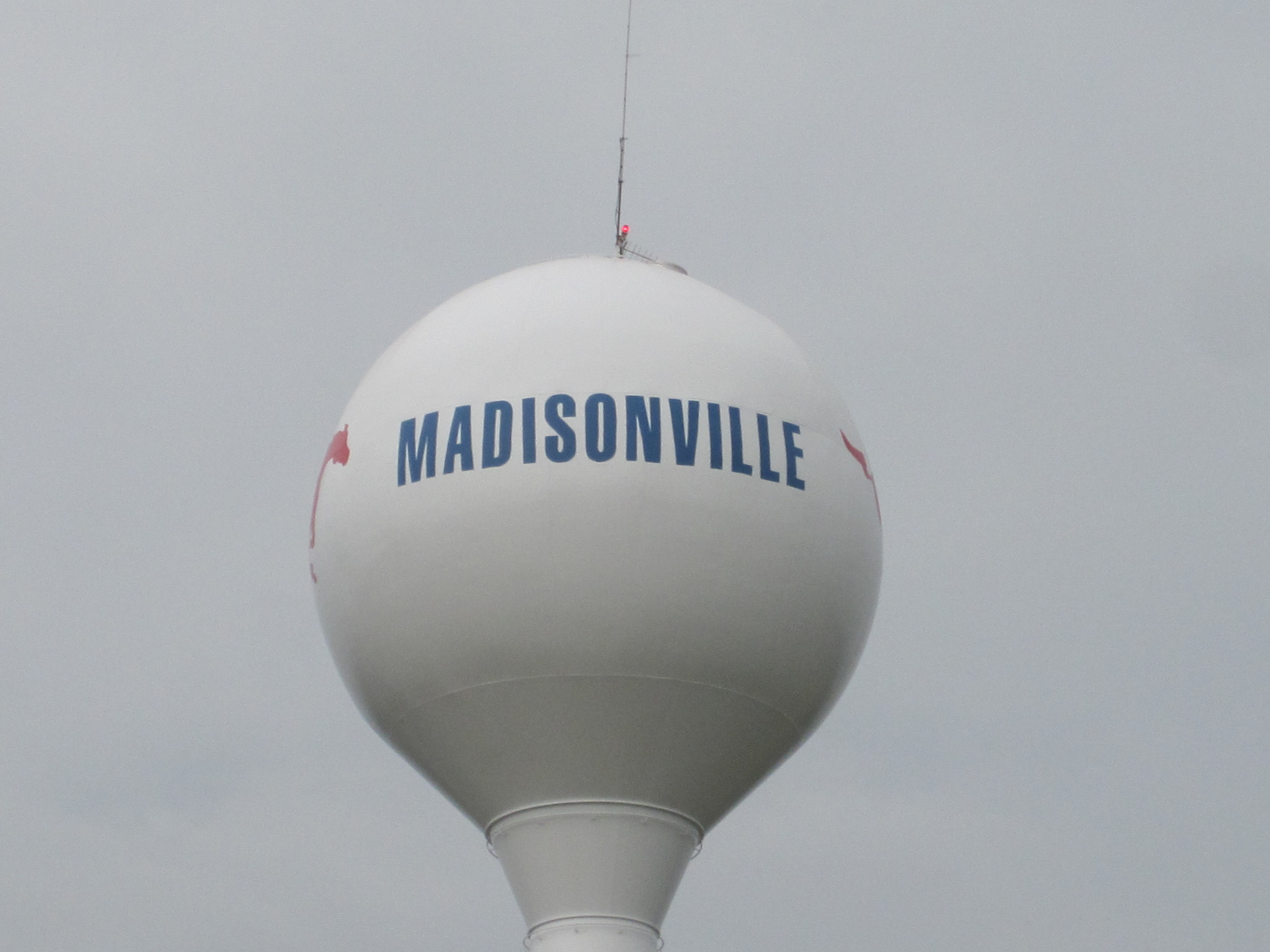
Madisonville water tower

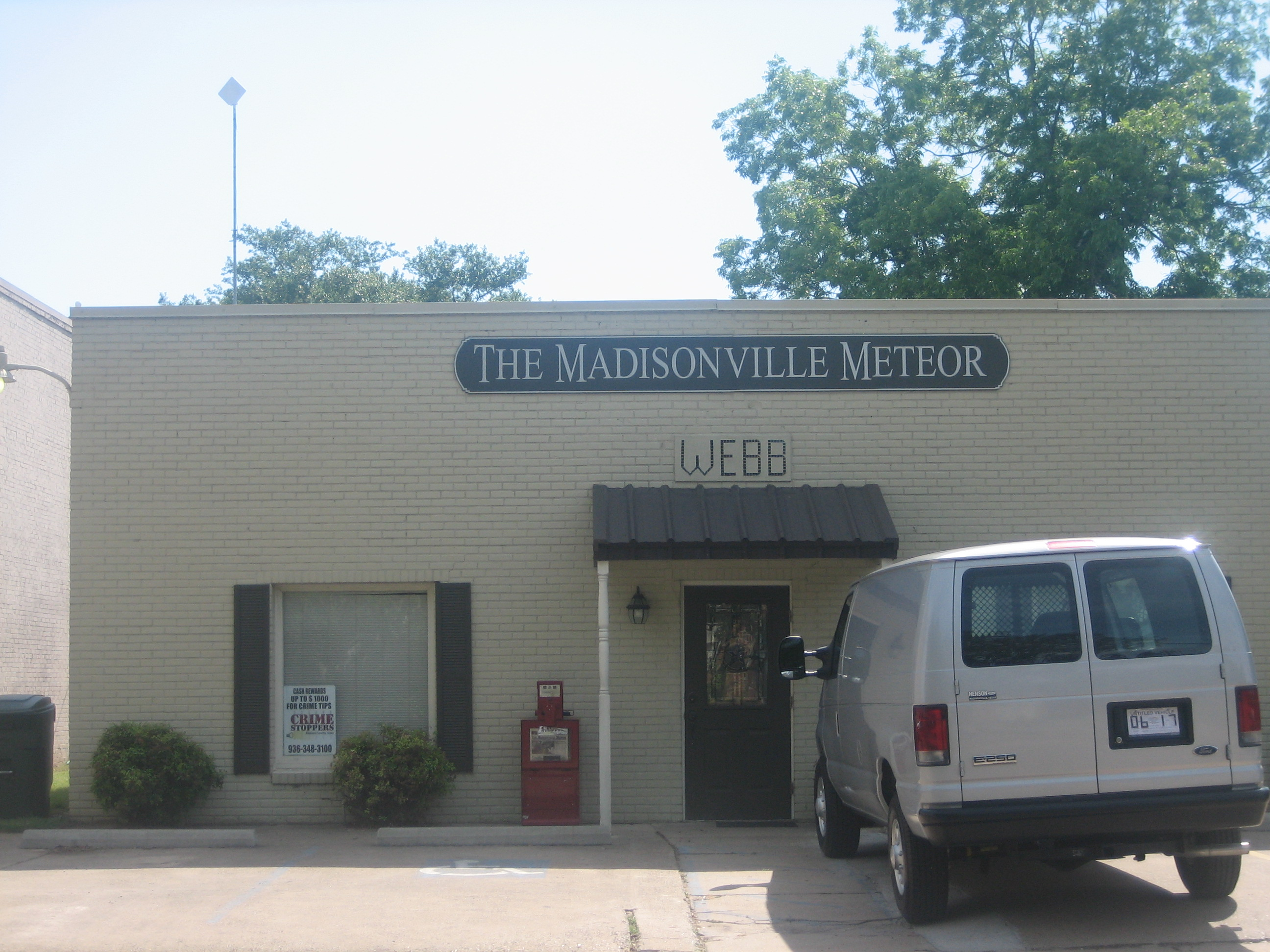
The Madisonville Meteor newspaper office is located next to the Madison County Museum.

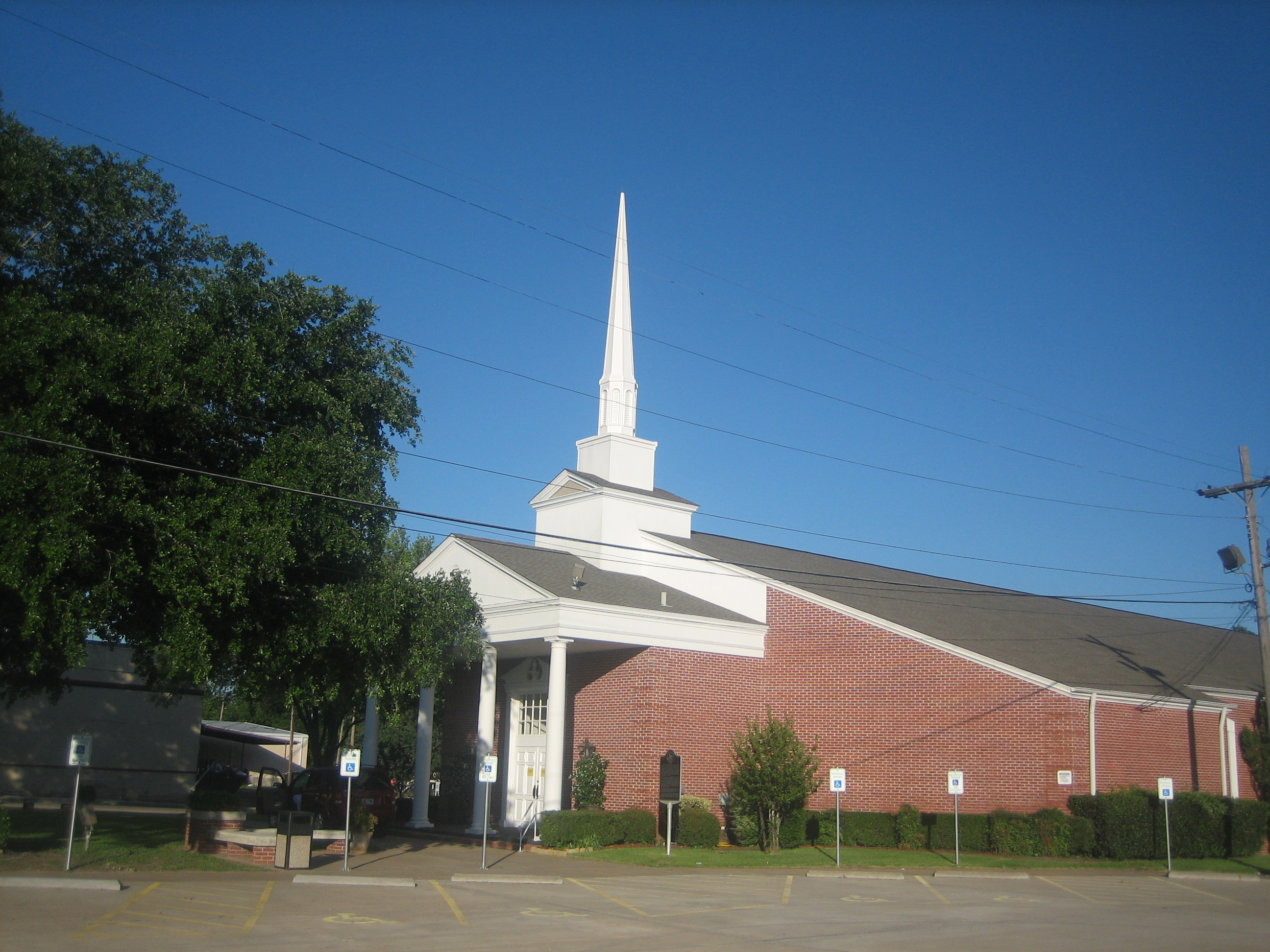
The First Baptist Church is among several houses of worship in Madisonville.

== See also ==
- List of municipalities in Texas
