= Wealthy (disambiguation) =

To be wealthy is to have an abundance of valuable resources or material possessions.

Wealthy may also refer to:

- Wealthy (apple), an American apple cultivar
- Wealthy, Texas, an unincorporated community in the United States

== People ==
- Wealthy Babcock, an American mathematician
- Annie Wealthy Holland, an American educator

== See also ==
- Wealth (disambiguation)
- Affluence (disambiguation)
- Affluent (disambiguation)
