= Guys Store, Texas =

Guys Store
- Unincorporated community
- Interactive map of Guys Store
- Location within Texas Guys Store (the United States)
- Coordinates: 31°13′13″N 95°49′28″W
- Country: United States
- State: Texas
- County: Leon County
- Elevation: 292 ft (89 m)
- GNIS feature ID: 2034941

Guys Store is an unincorporated community located along State Highway 811 in Leon County, Texas, United States.

== History ==
The settlement was established in 1871 and was named after the man who owned the store where the post office was established in the same year. By 1907, the settlement had a Baptist and a Methodist church, a cotton gin, a gristmill, a general store, a blacksmith, as well six schools; three for white and three for black students, with a total enrollment of 205. The communal postal office closed in 1927, and so the community's mail was directed to Nineveh, Texas.

By the 1940s, the community had a business and scattered residences. At that time, the place was popular amongst gamblers and sportsmen, making horse racing and card games the most popular attraction there. In 1983, the community only had a business and a cemetery.

Guys Store reported a population of 100 between in the years 1884 and 1890, in which it then dropped to 25 in 1892. It then had a population of 128 in 1904 and 50 in 1933.
