= Centerville Independent School District =

Centerville Independent School District may refer to:

- Centerville Independent School District (Leon County, Texas)
- Centerville Independent School District (Trinity County, Texas)
