= Wealth (disambiguation) =

Wealth is the abundance of valuable resources or material possessions.

Wealth may also refer to:

- Wealth (film), a 1921 American film directed by William Desmond Taylor
- Gospel of Wealth, an essay by Andrew Carnegie
- Plutus (play) or Wealth, a comedy by Aristophanes
- WealthTV, a cable television channel in the United States
- "Wealth" (Stewart Lee's Comedy Vehicle), a TV episode

== See also ==
- Wealthy (disambiguation)
- Affluence (disambiguation)
- Affluent (disambiguation)
