= National Register of Historic Places listings in Leon County, Texas =

Location of Leon County in Texas

This is a list of the National Register of Historic Places listings in Leon County, Texas.

This is intended to be a complete list of properties listed on the National Register of Historic Places in Leon County, Texas. There is one property listed on the National Register in the county. This property is also a State Antiquities Landmark and contains a Recorded Texas Historic Landmark.

This National Park Service list is complete through NPS recent listings posted March 21, 2025.

== Current listings ==
The locations of National Register properties may be seen in a mapping service provided.

	Name on the Register	Image	Date listed	Location	City or town	Description
1	Leon County Courthouse and Jails	Leon County Courthouse and Jails	December 12, 1977 (#77001458)	Public Sq; 31°15′30″N 95°58′41″W	Centerville	State Antiquities Landmark, includes Recorded Texas Historic Landmark

== See also ==
- National Register of Historic Places listings in Texas
- Recorded Texas Historic Landmarks in Leon County
