= Corinth, Leon County, Texas =

Corinth, Texas
- Unincorporated community
- Location within Texas Location within the United States
- Coordinates: 31°22′23″N 96°00′11″W
- Country: United States
- State: Texas
- County: Leon
- Elevation: 400 ft (120 m)
- Time zone: UTC-6 (Central (CST))
  - Summer (DST): UTC-5 (CDT)
- Area codes: 903,430
- GNIS feature ID: 1379589

Corinth is an unincorporated community in Leon County, Texas, United States. Corinth is located on Texas State Highway 75, 8.1 miles (13.0 km) north of Centerville. Corinth was founded in the late 1800s and named for Biblical Corinth.

By the 1900s, Corinth had a school, a church, and several businesses; in 1910, a telephone company opened in the community. The school closed in the late twentieth century, and by 2000 Corinth had no businesses or churches and consisted mainly of scattered ranches.
