= List of killings by law enforcement officers in the United States, June 2022 =

This is a list of people reported killed by non-military law enforcement officers in the United States in June 2022, whether in the line of duty or not, and regardless of reason or method. The listing documents the occurrence of a death, making no implications regarding wrongdoing or justification on the part of the person killed or officer involved. Killings are arranged by date of the incident that caused death. Different death dates, if known, are noted in the description. The table below lists 106 people.

== June 2022 ==
Date	Name (age) of deceased	Race of deceased	Location	Description
2022-06-30	Christian Parker (37)	Black	Springfield, Virginia	
2022-06-30	Robert Hubbard (43)	White	Safety Harbor, Florida	
2022-06-29	Mark Sales (66)	Unknown race	Pueblo, Colorado	
2022-06-29	Alejandro Molina Cornelio (31)	Hispanic	Fort Worth, Texas	
2022-06-29	Luis Angel Garcia (29)	Hispanic	El Paso, Texas	
2022-06-29	Michael McPhail (34)	Black	Irving, Texas	
2022-06-29	Joshua De'Miguel Kavota (33)	Black	Saranac Lake, New York	
2022-06-28	Unnamed person	Unknown race	Albuquerque, New Mexico	
2022-06-28	Samuel Quinton Edwards (34)	White	Louisville, Kentucky	
2022-06-28	Suzanne M. Shepherd (69)	Unknown	Philadelphia, Pennsylvania	A police vehicle turning left on South Nine Street struck Shepherd, a pedestrian. Shepherd died of her injuries later that day.
2022-06-27	Jayland Walker (25)	Black	Akron, Ohio	Walker refused to stop his vehicle for police and led them on a pursuit during which, police allege, Walker fired a gun. Walker stopped and fled on foot, and was shot dead when, according to police, he "posed a deadly threat" by making "a forward motion of his arm" and by "going down to his waist area". A handgun and loaded magazine were found in Walker's vehicle.
2022-06-27	Rakim Durham (30)	Black	Phoenix, Arizona	
2022-06-27	Isaiah P. Proctor (40)	White	Arvada, Colorado	
2022-06-27	Michael Charles Thompson (36)	Black	El Paso, Texas	
2022-06-26	Brett Jay Chapman (33)	White	Pueblo, Colorado	
2022-06-26	Kevin Eugene Boston (45)	Black	Charlotte, North Carolina	
2022-06-25	Curtis Kimbrough (42)	White	Grant-Valkaria, Florida	
2022-06-25	Arlen Jay Bates (66)	Black	North Little Rock, Arkansas	
2022-06-25	Unnamed man	Unknown race	San Bernardino, California	
2022-06-24	Unknown	Unknown	Pine River Township, Michigan	A trooper responding to a call drove through a red light, striking another vehicle, killing the passenger. The trooper, Michael Fox, was later charged with involuntary manslaughter.
2022-06-24	Saudi Arai Lee (31)	Black	Savannah, Georgia	
2022-06-24	Christopher DeVon Kelley (38)	Black	Topeka, Kansas	The footage was released.
2022-06-24	Robert W. McNamara (68)	Unknown race	Lake Placid, Florida	
2022-06-24	Joy Taylor-Graham (47)	White	Lore City, Ohio	
2022-06-23	Keith Carroll (59)	White	Jackson Township, Monroe County, Pennsylvania	
2022-06-23	Steven Ray Johnson (46)	Unknown race	Salisbury, North Carolina	
2022-06-23	Briseida Figueroa (21)	Hispanic	Fresno, Texas	
2022-06-23	Kemal Shea Jr. (58)	White	Trophy Club, Texas	
2022-06-22	Raymond Joseph Calderon (30)	Hispanic	San Jose, California	
2022-06-22	Name Withheld (29)	Black	Houston, Texas	
2022-06-22	Jason Dodds (42)	Black	Albion, Michigan	
2022-06-22	Timothy Charles Gravitt (49)	White	Thomaston, Georgia	
2022-06-21	Terry Harrell (58)	Black	Baltimore, Maryland	
2022-06-21	Taylor Ray Stevenson (25)	White	Lindale, Texas	
2022-06-21	Quincy J. Pritchett (43)	Black	Lima, Ohio	
2022-06-21	Antonio Beekman (41)	Black	Norfolk, Virginia	
2022-06-21	Peter Pfister (27)	Unknown race	Blue Hill, Maine	
2022-06-21	Shane Earl Holland	White	Adelanto, California	A sheriff's deputy shot Holland following a traffic stop and foot chase. Few details were revealed, other than that Holland was unarmed when he was shot. The California Department of Justice stated they were investigating the shooting, which is standard procedure in California when an unarmed individual is shot and killed by police.
2022-06-21	Darnell Trevon Travis	Unknown race	Redlands, California	
2022-06-20	Amos Lane (57)	Unknown race	Fairbanks, Alaska	
2022-06-20	Kevin Greene (51)	Black	Abilene, Texas	
2022-06-20	Unnamed person	White	Ponca City, Oklahoma	
2022-06-19	Adnan Husejnovic (33)	White	Manchester, New Hampshire	
2022-06-19	Oscar Santiago (24)	Hispanic	Los Angeles, CA	
2022-06-19	Unnamed man	Native American	Sanders, Arizona	
2022-06-19	Roy Sink (48)	White	Anadarko, Oklahoma	
2022-06-19	Frank Baty (58)	Black	Albuquerque, New Mexico	
2022-06-19	Jason Neal Puckett (38)	White	Coeburn, Virginia	
2022-06-19	Jason Thompson (28)	Black	Vallejo, California	
2022-06-18	William Ivan Cedillos (41)	Hispanic	Falfurrias, Texas	
2022-06-18	Derrick Dewayne Clark Jr. (24)	Black	Milwaukie, Oregon	
2022-06-18	Gonzalo Aceituno Jr. (30)	Hispanic	Fresno, California	
2022-06-16	Christian Robert Jensen (54)	White	Cleveland, Tennessee	
2022-06-16	Joseph Maverick Nagle (22)	White	Monterey Township, Michigan	Nagle was stopped by police on suspicion of impaired driving, and was arrested after failing a sobriety test. He was shot dead during a physical altercation with the officer.
2022-06-16	Matthew Brevosky (38)	White	Weston, West Virginia	
2022-06-15	Unnamed woman	Unknown race	Prescott, Arizona	
2022-06-15	Richard Hollis (21)	White	Miami, Florida	
2022-06-15	Jeremy Banach (39)	White	Star, Idaho	
2022-06-15	Christopher Robert Hensley (35)	White	Fletcher, North Carolina	
2022-06-15	David Yniguez (32)	Hispanic	Farmington, New Mexico	
2022-06-14	Michael Christopher Crater (33)	White	Austin, Texas	
2022-06-14	John Gries (41)	White	Seguin, Texas	
2022-06-14	Matthew Tyler Michel (37)	Unknown race	Coos Bay, Oregon	
2022-06-13	Normiez Reeves (35)	Black	Holly Springs, Georgia	
2022-06-13	Timothy Adams (32)	White	Valdosta, Georgia	
2022-06-13	Jovontay Williams (32)	Black	Charlotte, North Carolina	
2022-06-13	Jerome Lavon Connelly (35)	Black	Sawmills, North Carolina	After crashing his vehicle, Connelly—holding a pistol and assault rifle—tried to obtain a ride from passing cars. Police exchanged gunfire with Connelly when they arrived, and he fled wounded into a wooded area, dying later that day in hospital. A "significant" amount of narcotics were found in Connelly's car, and multiple firearms were located on Connelly.
2022-06-13	Brandon Keith Ned (42)	Black	Duncanville, Texas	Ned fired a gunshot at a lobby of the Duncanville Fieldhouse, where a summer camp was taking place, before attempting to enter a gymnasium where children were present. Police arrived and Ned was killed in a shoot-out.
2022-06-13	Viet Do Nguyen (27)	Asian	Kent, Washington	Police responded to a vehicle reported to be stopped on the road and shot the driver, Nguyen, who was allegedly armed with a gun.
2022-06-12	Ofelia Nuñez (74)	Latino	Fennville, Michigan	A deputy and his training officer were driving 87–95 miles per hour in a cruiser without lights on when they struck another vehicle at an intersection, killing Nuñez and wounding her husband. The deputies said they were chasing a speeding minivan when the crash occurred. The deputy driving was charged with misdemeanors and later resigned.
2022-06-12	Carlos Eli Chacon-Castillo (42)	Hispanic	Austin, Texas	
2022-06-11	Christian Glass (22)	White	Clear Creek County, Colorado	Glass called police after his car got stuck on a rural road. After officers arrived, Glass offered to throw out two knives and a hammer he had from a geology trip in Utah, but deputies instead told him to exit the car. An officer pulled his gun out after seeing a knife, after which Glass threw it to the other side of the car. During the confrontation, a Colorado State Patrol supervisor mentioned that Glass had not committed any crime and there was no medical issue they were not aware of. After an hour and twenty minutes, an officer climbed onto the hood and pointed a flashlight at Glass, who picked up a second knife. Police broke Glass's window, shot him with beanbags, tasered him, then shot him when the taser was ineffective.
2022-06-11	Cesar Anthony Pena (41)	White	Mableton, Georgia	
2022-06-11	Jonathan Hambleton (38)	White	Springville, Utah	
2022-06-10	Daniel Raymond Honeycutt (38)	White	Elizabethton, Tennessee	
2022-06-09	Curtis Roy Young (40)	White	Johnsonville, North Carolina	
2022-06-09	Robert Tyler White (32)	Unknown	Gadsden, Alabama	An officer shot White outside an elementary school after he allegedly tried to enter it. According to police White tried to grab the officer's gun before he was shot. According to White's brother, White had mental issues and had attended the elementary school. White's brother also said he may have tried to have police kill him.
2022-06-08	Jason James Morales (45)	White	Davenport, Iowa	
2022-06-08	Dakota Coleman (27)	White	Oconto, Wisconsin	
2022-06-08	Juan Sarmiento (42)	Hispanic	Wimauma, Florida	
2022-06-07	Pozz Striblin (20)	Black	Columbus, Ohio	
2022-06-06	Ernesto Battle (73)	Hispanic	Miami, Florida	
2022-06-05	Jason Harold James (47)	White	St. Augustine, Florida	
2022-06-05	Ricky Jimenez (51)	Unknown race	Lancaster, California	
2022-06-05	Jacob Poitraw (25)	White	Presque Isle, Maine	
2022-06-04	Walter Antreall Joyce (45)	Black	Jonesboro, Arkansas	
2022-06-04	Zachary C. Rutherford (32)	Unknown race	Wenatchee, Washington	
2022-06-04	Joseph Robert Henry Thompson (66)	Black	Towson, Maryland	
2022-06-03	Tyler Mehki Sincere Boages (19)	Black	West Columbia, South Carolina	
2022-06-03	Kevin Colindres (32)	Unknown race	West New York, New Jersey	
2022-06-03	Name Withheld ()	Unknown race	Fort Walton Beach, Florida	
2022-06-03	Richie Holcomb (36)	White	Birch River, West Virginia	
2022-06-03	Michael Alan Loman (56)	White	Lakeland, Florida	
2022-06-03	Edward Samaan (28)	White	Naperville, Illinois	
2022-06-03	Andre "AJ" Hernandez Jr (13)	Hispanic	San Antonio, Texas	
2022-06-02	Corey Brewer (45)	Black	Memphis, Tennessee	
2022-06-02	Desmond Eskridge (42)	Black	Cleveland, Ohio	
2022-06-02	Marvin Cua (23)	Hispanic	Los Angeles, California	
2022-06-02	Mike Smith (48)	Unknown race	San Bernardino, California	
2022-06-02	Kevin Dwight Nashio (25)	Unknown	Whiteriver, Arizona	
2022-06-02	Gonzalo Lopez (46)	Latino	Jourdanton, Texas	On May 12, convicted murderer Gonzalo Lopez attacked a prison bus driver and briefly stole the bus before exiting and fleeing into the woods. On June 2, Lopez killed a family of five in Centerville and stole their pick-up truck. Lopez was later located in Jourdanton and died during a shootout with police.
2022-06-01	Marshall Curtis Jones (27)	Black	Kent, Washington	Marshall Curtis Jones, wanted for murder, was shot and killed by police while they attempted to arrest him. An officer shot and killed Marshall after he charged officers with a knife when they knocked on his door.
2022-06-01	Derrick Glen Avey (42)	Unknown race	Hopewell, Virginia	
2022-06-01	Anthony Keith Taylor	Unknown race	Sand City, California	
2022-06-01	Robert Wayne Webb (66)	White	Fort Collins, Colorado	
2022-06-01	Phillip Torres (30)	Hispanic	Lubbock, Texas	

== See also ==
- Death in custody § United States
- Henry A. Wallace Police Crime Public Database
- List of cases of police brutality
- List of countries with annual rates and counts for killings by law enforcement officers
- List of law enforcement officers killed in the line of duty in the United States
- List of law enforcement officers convicted for an on-duty killing in the United States
- List of shootings by US immigration agents
- List of police reforms related to the George Floyd protests
- List of unarmed African Americans killed by law enforcement officers in the United States
- Lists of killings by law enforcement officers
- Police brutality in the United States
- Police misconduct § United States
- Police riot § United States
- Police use of deadly force in the United States
