= Hilltop Lakes, Texas =

- Census-designated place
- Location within Texas Location within the United States
- Coordinates: 31°04′32″N 96°11′29″W
- Country: United States
- State: Texas
- County: Leon

Area
  - Total: 8.7 sq mi (22.6 km^{2})
  - Land: 8.5 sq mi (22.1 km^{2})
  - Water: 0.19 sq mi (0.5 km^{2})
- Elevation: 433 ft (132 m)

Population (2010)
  - Total: 1,101
  - Density: 129/sq mi (49.8/km^{2})
- Time zone: UTC-6 (Central (CST))
  - Summer (DST): UTC-5 (CDT)
- ZIP code: 77871
- Area codes: 903, 430
- FIPS code: 48-34136
- GNIS feature ID: 2586936

Hilltop Lakes is a census-designated place and unincorporated community in Leon County, Texas, United States. As of the 2020 census, Hilltop Lakes had a population of 1,385.

== Geography ==
Hilltop Lakes is in southwestern Leon County, 27 miles (43 km) southwest of Centerville, the county seat. The community is built around several artificial lakes, including Mirror Lake, Swan Lake, Kickapoo Lake, Cherokee Lake, and Lake Tonkawa. The lakes are built on Running Creek or a tributary, with Running Creek flowing south to the Navasota River.

According to the U.S. Census Bureau, the Hilltop Lakes CDP has a total area of 8.7 square miles (22.6 km^{2}), of which 8.5 square miles (22.1 km^{2}) are land and 0.2 square miles (0.5 km^{2}), or 2.37%, are water.

== Demographics ==
Historical population
Census	Pop.	Note	%±
2010	1,101		—
2020	1,385		25.8%
U.S. Decennial Census; 1850–1900 1910; 1920 1930 1940; 1950 1960 1970; 1980 1990 2000; 2010 2020

Hilltop Lakes first appeared as a census designated place in the 2010 U.S. census.

Hilltop Lakes CDP, Texas – Racial and ethnic composition Note: the US Census treats Hispanic/Latino as an ethnic category. This table excludes Latinos from the racial categories and assigns them to a separate category. Hispanics/Latinos may be of any race.
Race / Ethnicity (NH = Non-Hispanic)	Pop 2010	Pop 2020	% 2010	% 2020
White alone (NH)	1,058	1,216	96.09%	87.80%
Black or African American alone (NH)	8	21	0.73%	1.52%
Native American or Alaska Native alone (NH)	3	9	0.27%	0.65%
Asian alone (NH)	5	5	0.45%	0.36%
Native Hawaiian or Pacific Islander alone (NH)	0	0	0.00%	0.00%
Other race alone (NH)	0	2	0.00%	0.14%
Mixed race or Multiracial (NH)	13	56	1.18%	4.04%
Hispanic or Latino (any race)	14	76	1.27%	5.49%
Total	1,101	1,385	100.00%	100.00%
