= Gonzalo Lopez =

American fugitive and mass murderer (1976–2022)

- Mugshot of Lopez taken by the TDCJ
- Born: Gonzalo Artemio Lopez; February 10, 1976; Weslaco, Texas, U.S.
- Died: June 2, 2022 (aged 46); Jourdanton, Texas, U.S.
- Cause of death: Gunshot wounds
- Other names: Artemio Gonzalo Lopez; Ganzo Lopez; Gonzo Lopez; Gonzol Lopez
- Convictions: Capital murder Attempted capital murder Aggravated kidnapping
- Penalty: Life imprisonment

Details
- Victims: 6
- Span of crimes: 2005–2022
- Country: United States
- State: Texas

Gonzalo Artemio Lopez (February 10, 1976 – June 2, 2022) was an American fugitive and mass murderer who killed a total of six people in separate murders in 2005 and 2022. In 2005, Lopez kidnapped and murdered a man in Weslaco, Texas. He was convicted of capital murder and sentenced to life in prison. In May 2022, Lopez received international attention when he escaped from prison custody by assaulting a corrections officer and fleeing from a prison bus. He became a wanted fugitive and evaded authorities for three weeks. On June 2, Lopez broke into a ranch and murdered five people from the same family, including three children, before stealing weapons and a pickup truck. Later that same day, police spotted Lopez and engaged in a shootout with him after a high-speed chase, where he was fatally shot during the exchange of gunfire.

== Criminal history ==
Lopez's criminal history dates back to 1994. He was convicted of aggravated assault, possession of marijuana, failure to stop and render aid (hit and run), and unauthorized use of a motor vehicle. In 1996, he was convicted of all charges and sentenced to eight years in prison.

On May 11, 2004, Lopez was a passenger in a vehicle that was observed speeding by two Zapata County sheriff's deputies. As the police attempted to pull the vehicle over, the driver sped away. A high-speed chase followed, involving police officers from both Zapata County and Webb County. During the chase, shots were fired at the police by both the driver and Lopez. The vehicle later stopped and both men fled on foot. The driver was captured the following day and was sentenced to sixty years in prison for attempted capital murder of a police officer. Lopez, however, remained at large.

== Murder of Lupe Ramirez ==
On March 23, 2005, Lopez and an acquaintance known only as "Rick" broke into the home of 37-year-old Jose Guadalupe "Lupe" Ramirez in Weslaco, Texas. Armed with guns, the men threatened Ramirez's wife at gunpoint to lead them to her husband in the bedroom. Lopez and "Rick" let Ramirez's wife back downstairs, tied up Ramirez and kidnapped him, fleeing in a red car. Ramirez's wife later received a phone call from him, where he told her he was all right. However, the calls later stopped. The following morning, Ramirez's wife called the police and reported the kidnapping.

Lopez and Rick were working for the La Mana drug cartel based in Tamaulipas, Mexico. According to Lopez, the La Mana leader, Juan Lerma, had ordered them to kidnap Ramirez because he owed the cartel $40,000. The cartel had supposedly fronted Ramirez with marijuana and cocaine, which he never repaid to them. Following the kidnapping, Lopez and Rick took Ramirez to the home of Ramirez's mother. Ramirez was ordered to turn over any valuables to repay the debt, relinquishing three trucks, thirty pounds of marijuana, and $8,000. The trucks were given to Lerma while Lopez and Rick kept the money and drugs for themselves. According to Lopez, Lerma then ordered them to kill Ramirez.

Lopez and Rick drove Ramirez to a hill, where they dug a grave and tossed Ramirez inside before Lopez killed Ramirez by striking him with a pickax. An autopsy later confirmed that Ramirez's cause of death was three "chop-type" wounds to the head.

=== Capture and trial ===
In April 2005, following a tip from a confidential informant, Lopez was arrested. Ramirez's wife positively identified him from a police lineup as one of the men who broke into her home and kidnapped her husband. Later that month, Lopez led authorities to the location where he had buried Ramirez's body. He refused to name his accomplice.

On February 14, 2006, Lopez's trial for capital murder began. On February 16, he was found guilty of one count of capital murder and one count of aggravated kidnapping. He was sentenced to life in prison. His accomplice "Rick" was never identified or found.

While in prison, authorities learned of Lopez's involvement in the 2004 car chase and shooting of police officers. On December 13, 2007, he was found guilty of attempted capital murder of a police officer and was handed another life sentence.

== Prison escape ==
On May 12, 2022, Lopez was one of sixteen prisoners on board a Texas Department of Criminal Justice transport bus that was traveling to a medical appointment. Two veteran prison officers were also on board. During the journey, Lopez managed to remove his handcuffs and use a sharp object to cut through a metal door that was separating the prisoners from the driver. He crawled into the driver's section where he stabbed the corrections officer driving the bus. The bus stopped and a fight broke out between Lopez and the prison officers. Lopez got off the bus and was followed by the officers. He then returned to the bus and drove off, with the bus now containing no officers on board. As he drove away, the officers fired at the bus and hit the tires. Lopez managed to drive the vehicle for a mile before wrecking it. He then fled the bus on foot and escaped into some woods, where he successfully evaded law enforcement.

The following day, Lopez was added to the Texas 10 Most Wanted Fugitives List. On May 14, the reward for information leading to his arrest increased to $50,000. The officers recovered and the stab wounds to the bus driver were not life-threatening.

=== Collins family murders ===
On June 2, 2022, Lopez broke into a ranch owned by the Collins family in Centerville, Texas. At the ranch, he murdered 66-year-old Mark Collins and four of his grandchildren: 18-year-old Waylon Collins, 16-year-old Carson Collins, 11-year-old Hudson Collins (all brothers), and their cousin, 11-year-old Bryson Collins. Medical examiners later disclosed that all five family members died of gunshot and stab wounds. After the murders, Lopez stole several guns from the ranch, including an AR-15, as well as a white pickup truck which he fled in.

A concerned relative of the family that had not heard from Mark contacted the police later that day. Police arrived at the ranch around 6 p.m. and discovered the bodies of the five family members. Lopez was immediately named as a suspect and police soon learned guns and the family pickup truck had been stolen. Police then sent out a statewide alert informing police to be on the lookout for a white 1999 Chevrolet Silverado.

== Death ==
Late on June 2, a deputy sheriff from Atascosa County spotted the pickup truck and confirmed the license plate matched the one stolen. Officers tailed Lopez and were instructed to hold back until he entered Jourdanton, so more officers could assist in apprehending him. Spike strips were laid across the highway by Jourdanton Police Chief Eric Kaiser, which Lopez drove over, puncturing all of the tires. Lopez continued to evade police and drove through a field before entering the city limits of Jourdanton.

Lopez then shot at police through the truck's window with an AR-15 style rifle, which he had stolen from the ranch. Afterward, he lost control, drove into a utility pole, and crashed into a fence. He exited the truck and began shooting at officers. Four officers returned fire, killing him. No officer was struck or injured during the exchange of gunfire but Lopez did manage to hit a patrol vehicle's windshield.

== Aftermath ==
On June 6, 2022, the Texas Department of Criminal Justice announced it would be suspending inmate transports as it "conduct[ed] a comprehensive review of its transportation procedures."

== See also ==
- List of killings by law enforcement officers in the United States, June 2022
- List of mass shootings in the United States in 2022
