= Flynn, Texas =

Unincorporated community in Texas, US

Coordinates: 31°09′04″N 96°07′30″W

Flynn is an unincorporated community in Leon County, Texas, United States. According to the Handbook of Texas, the community had an estimated population of 81 in 2000.
