= Affluent (disambiguation) =

To be affluent is to have an abundance of valuable resources or material possessions.

Affluent may also refer to:

- Affluent (geography), a stream or river that flows into a main stem river or a lake
- Affluent (horse), an American Thoroughbred racehorse

== See also ==
- Affluence (disambiguation)
- Effluent
- Wealthy (disambiguation)
- Wealth (disambiguation)
