= Wealthy, Texas =

Unincorporated community in Texas, US

Coordinates: 31°01′29″N 96°10′47″W

Wealthy is an unincorporated community in Leon County, Texas, United States.

== History ==
A post office was established in Wealthy in 1894, and remained in operation until it was discontinued in 1914.

The community was originally called Poor and has been renamed Wealthy sometime between 1894 and 1896. According to Texas Towns : from Abner to Zipperlandville, the name was changed due to popular opinion. According to the Handbook of Texas, it was rather because the name Poor was rejected when applied for a post office.

By 1914, the population was 25.

== Geography ==
Wealthy is located along Farm to Market Road 3, 5 miles west of Normangee and 21 miles southwest of Centerville.
