= Nineveh, Texas =

Nineveh
- Unincorporated community
- Interactive map of Nineveh
- Location within Texas Nineveh (the United States)
- Coordinates: 31°23′1″N 95°48′22″W
- Country: United States
- State: Texas
- County: Matagorda County

Nineveh is an unincorporated community located along Farm Road 3178 in Leon County, Texas, United States.

== History ==
The area of the community was established in the late 1800s by early Christian immigrant families, which are the Houston Johnson, MCO Johnson, Fanny Raines, Dormans, Reeves, Halleys, Tilleys, Tubbs, Newsoms, Anders, Ellis, Danfords, Guytons and McGuires, and named it after the biblical city of Nineveh. By the 1890s, the community became infamous for its political volatility between the members of the Democratic and the Populist party. A communal post office operated in the community from 1900 to December 1966, with Benjamin F. Tubb as its first postmaster. By 1907, the community had 2 schools, in which its building serves as a venue for circuit riders to hold church services.

By 1914, Nineveh had a population of 50 as well as a cotton gin and a general store. The population increased to 150 in 1925, and that number subsequently declined in 1950, where it reportedly had 80 residents and 4 businesses. The population was recorded at 101 as of 2000.
