= Leona, Texas =

- Town
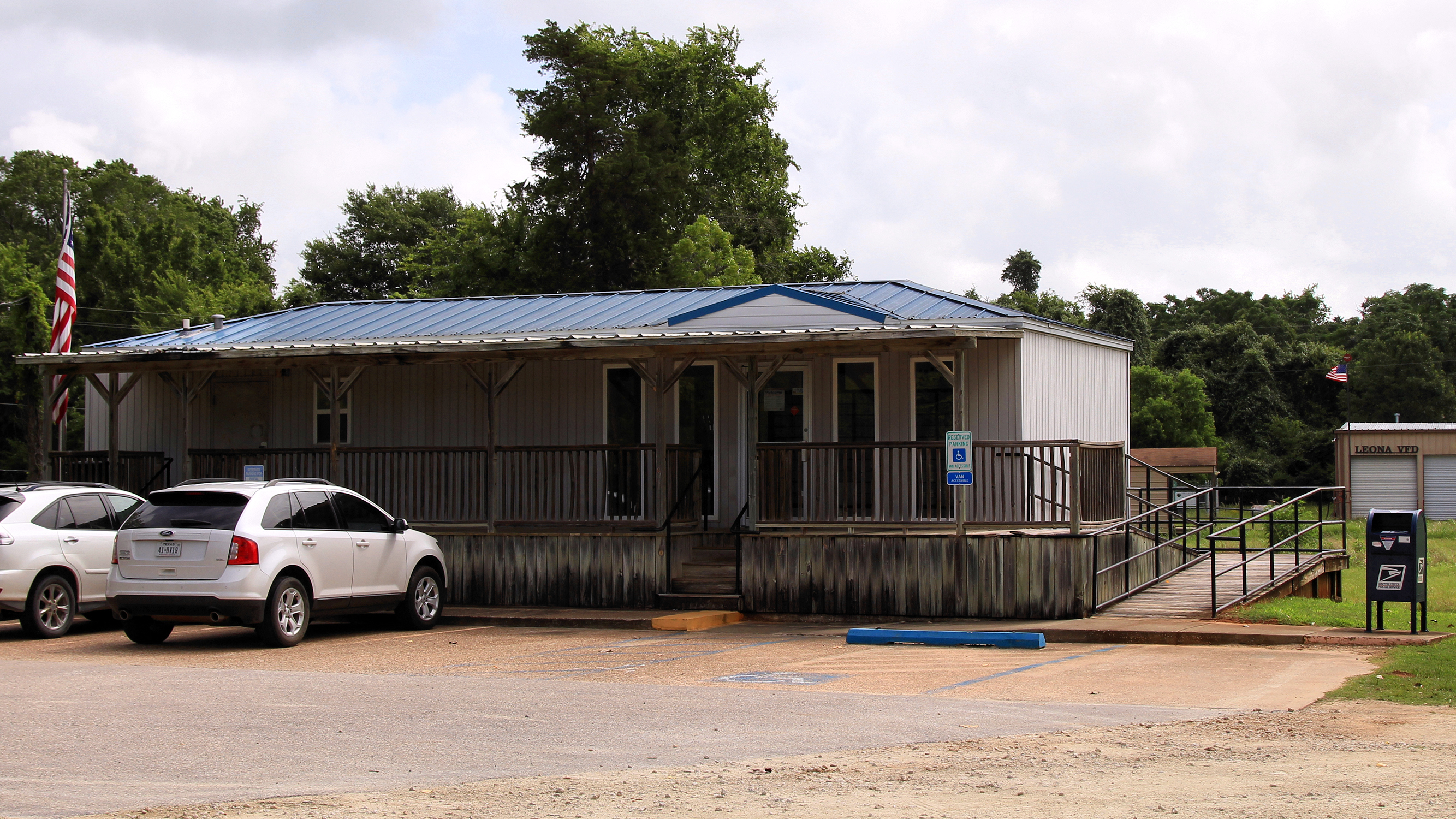
- Leona, Texas Post Office

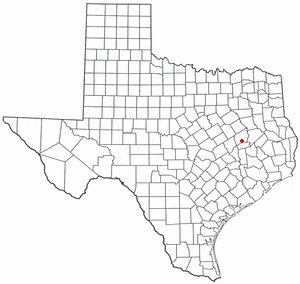
- Location of Leona, Texas

- Coordinates: 31°08′48″N 95°59′53″W
- Country: United States
- State: Texas
- County: Leon

Area
  - Total: 2.22 sq mi (5.76 km^{2})
  - Land: 2.22 sq mi (5.76 km^{2})
  - Water: 0 sq mi (0.00 km^{2})
- Elevation: 358 ft (109 m)

Population (2020)
  - Total: 151
  - Density: 67.9/sq mi (26.2/km^{2})
- Time zone: UTC-6 (Central (CST))
  - Summer (DST): UTC-5 (CDT)
- ZIP code: 75850
- Area codes: 903, 430
- FIPS code: 48-42340
- GNIS feature ID: 2410821

Leona is a town in Leon County, Texas, United States. The population was 151 at the 2020 census.

== Geography ==
According to the United States Census Bureau, the city has a total area of 2.2 square miles (5.7 km^{2}), all land.

== Demographics ==
Historical population
Census	Pop.	Note	%±
1970	96		—
1980	165		71.9%
1990	178		7.9%
2000	181		1.7%
2010	175		−3.3%
2020	151		−13.7%
U.S. Decennial Census; 2020 Census

=== 2020 census ===
As of the 2020 census, Leona had a population of 151. The median age was 43.6 years; 23.2% of residents were under the age of 18 and 17.9% of residents were 65 years of age or older. For every 100 females there were 67.8 males, and for every 100 females age 18 and over there were 75.8 males age 18 and over.

0.0% of residents lived in urban areas, while 100.0% lived in rural areas.

There were 61 households in Leona, of which 42.6% had children under the age of 18 living in them. Of all households, 34.4% were married-couple households, 16.4% were households with a male householder and no spouse or partner present, and 39.3% were households with a female householder and no spouse or partner present. About 27.9% of all households were made up of individuals and 9.8% had someone living alone who was 65 years of age or older.

There were 79 housing units, of which 22.8% were vacant. The homeowner vacancy rate was 6.3% and the rental vacancy rate was 5.9%.

Racial composition as of the 2020 census
Race	Number	Percent
White	119	78.8%
Black or African American	19	12.6%
American Indian and Alaska Native	0	0.0%
Asian	3	2.0%
Native Hawaiian and Other Pacific Islander	0	0.0%
Some other race	6	4.0%
Two or more races	4	2.6%
Hispanic or Latino (of any race)	13	8.6%

=== 2000 census ===
As of the census of 2000, there were 181 people, 71 households, and 48 families residing in the city. The population density was 83.2 inhabitants per square mile (32.1/km^{2}). There were 91 housing units at an average density of 41.8 per square mile (16.1/km^{2}). The racial makeup of the city was 83.43% White, 13.81% African American, 0.55% Asian, and 2.21% from two or more races. Hispanic or Latino of any race were 2.21% of the population.

There were 71 households, out of which 32.4% had children under the age of 18 living with them, 57.7% were married couples living together, 8.5% had a female householder with no husband present, and 31.0% were non-families. 31.0% of all households were made up of individuals, and 16.9% had someone living alone who was 65 years of age or older. The average household size was 2.55 and the average family size was 3.22.

In the city, the population was spread out, with 29.3% under the age of 18, 7.7% from 18 to 24, 26.0% from 25 to 44, 18.8% from 45 to 64, and 18.2% who were 65 years of age or older. The median age was 36 years. For every 100 females, there were 101.1 males. For every 100 females age 18 and over, there were 88.2 males.

The median income for a household in the city was $30,000, and the median income for a family was $37,083. Males had a median income of $27,500 versus $20,000 for females. The per capita income for the city was $17,725. About 4.8% of families and 11.2% of the population were below the poverty line, including 9.8% of those under the age of 18 and 16.7% of those 65 or over.

== Education ==
The City of Leona is served by the Centerville Independent School District.

== Notable person ==
- Albert Collins (1932–1993), blues guitarist and singer
