= Concord, Leon County, Texas =

Unincorporated community in Texas, US

Coordinates: 31°15′25″N 96°08′40″W

Concord is an unincorporated community in Leon County, Texas, United States. According to the Handbook of Texas, the community had an estimated population of 28 in 2000.
