= Egypt, Leon County, Texas =

Ghost town in Leon County, Texas

Egypt is a small rural community approximately twelve miles east of Centerville in eastern Leon County, Texas, United States. Settlement probably took place in the late 1800s or early 1900s. In the 1930s, a school served area families. Though the community was still shown on highway maps in 2000, no population figures were available. It is now considered a ghost town.
