= Centerville Independent School District (Leon County, Texas) =

School district in Texas, United States

Address
- 813 South Commerce Centerville, Texas, 75833; United States
- Coordinates: 31.2512°N 95.9796°W

District information
- Type: Public
- Grades: PK–12
- Schools: 2
- NCES District ID: 4813410

Students and staff
- Students: 668 (2023–2024)
- Teachers: 60.61 (on an FTE basis) (2023–2024)
- Staff: 61.72 (on an FTE basis) (2023–2024)
- Student–teacher ratio: 11.02 (2023–2024)

Other information
- Website: www.centerville.k12.tx.us

Centerville Independent School District is a public school district based in Centerville, Texas, USA. It contains an elementary school and a combined middle/high school. The district also serves the community of Leona.

In 2009, the school district was rated "academically acceptable" by the Texas Education Agency.
