= Affluence (disambiguation) =

Affluence is the abundance of valuable resources or valuable material possessions.

Affluence may also refer to:

- Affluence Garden, a public housing estate in Tuen Mun, Hong Kong
- Affluence stop, an MTR Light Rail stop adjacent to the estate

== See also ==
- Affluent (disambiguation)
- Affluenza, a portmanteau of affluence and influenza used by critics of consumerism
