= Leon County, Texas =

County in Texas, United States

- County
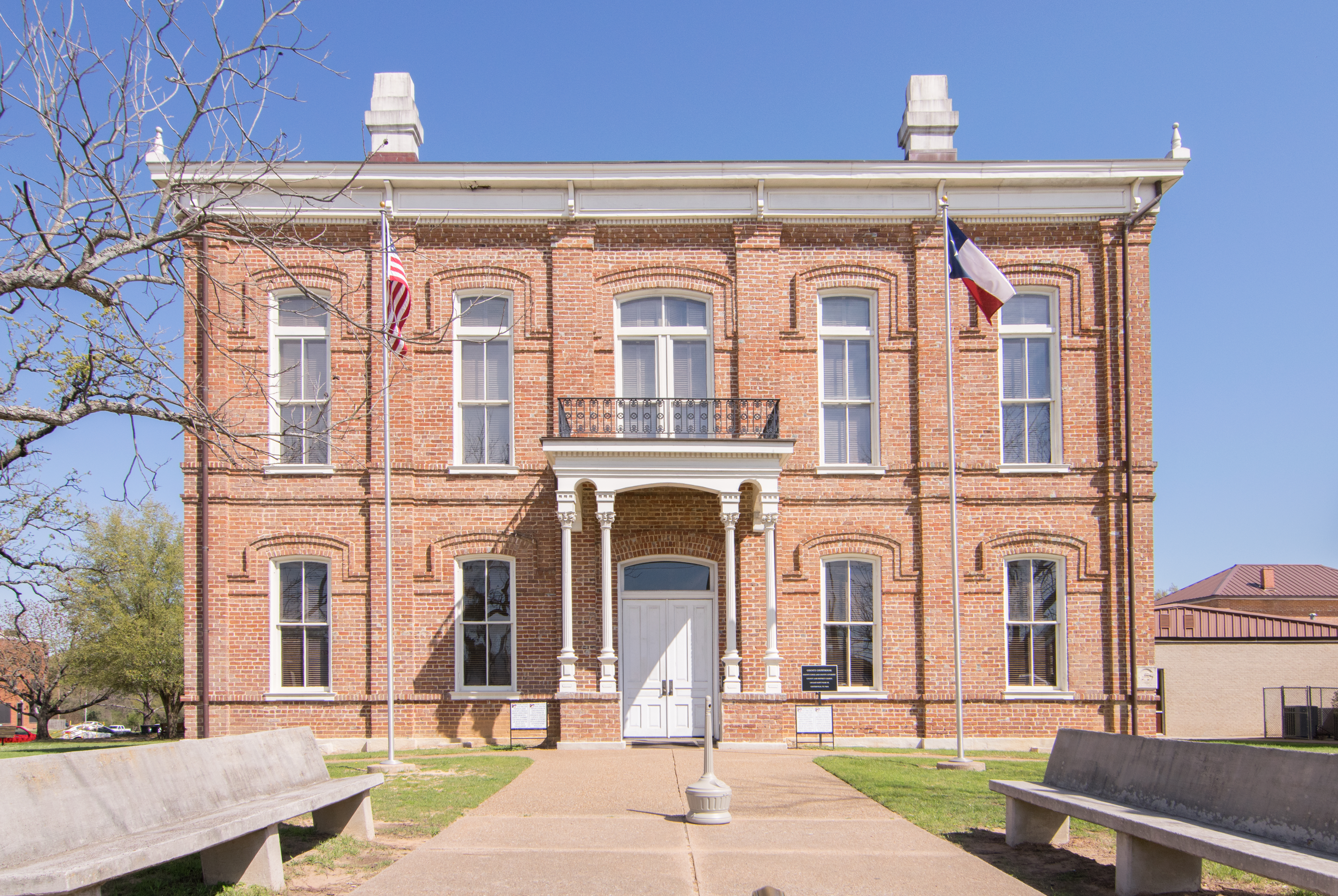
- The Leon County Courthouse in Centerville was originally built of slate brick in 1887. Two previous structures have occupied the current site.

- Location within the U.S. state of Texas
- Coordinates: 31°18′N 96°00′W
- Country: United States
- State: Texas
- Founded: 1846
- Named for: Martín de León
- Seat: Centerville
- Largest city: Buffalo

Area
  - Total: 1,081 sq mi (2,800 km^{2})
  - Land: 1,073 sq mi (2,780 km^{2})
  - Water: 7.5 sq mi (19 km^{2}) 0.7%

Population (2020)
  - Total: 15,719
  - Estimate (2025): 16,894 ▲
  - Density: 14.65/sq mi (5.656/km^{2})
- Time zone: UTC−6 (Central)
  - Summer (DST): UTC−5 (CDT)
- Congressional district: 17th
- Website: www.co.leon.tx.us

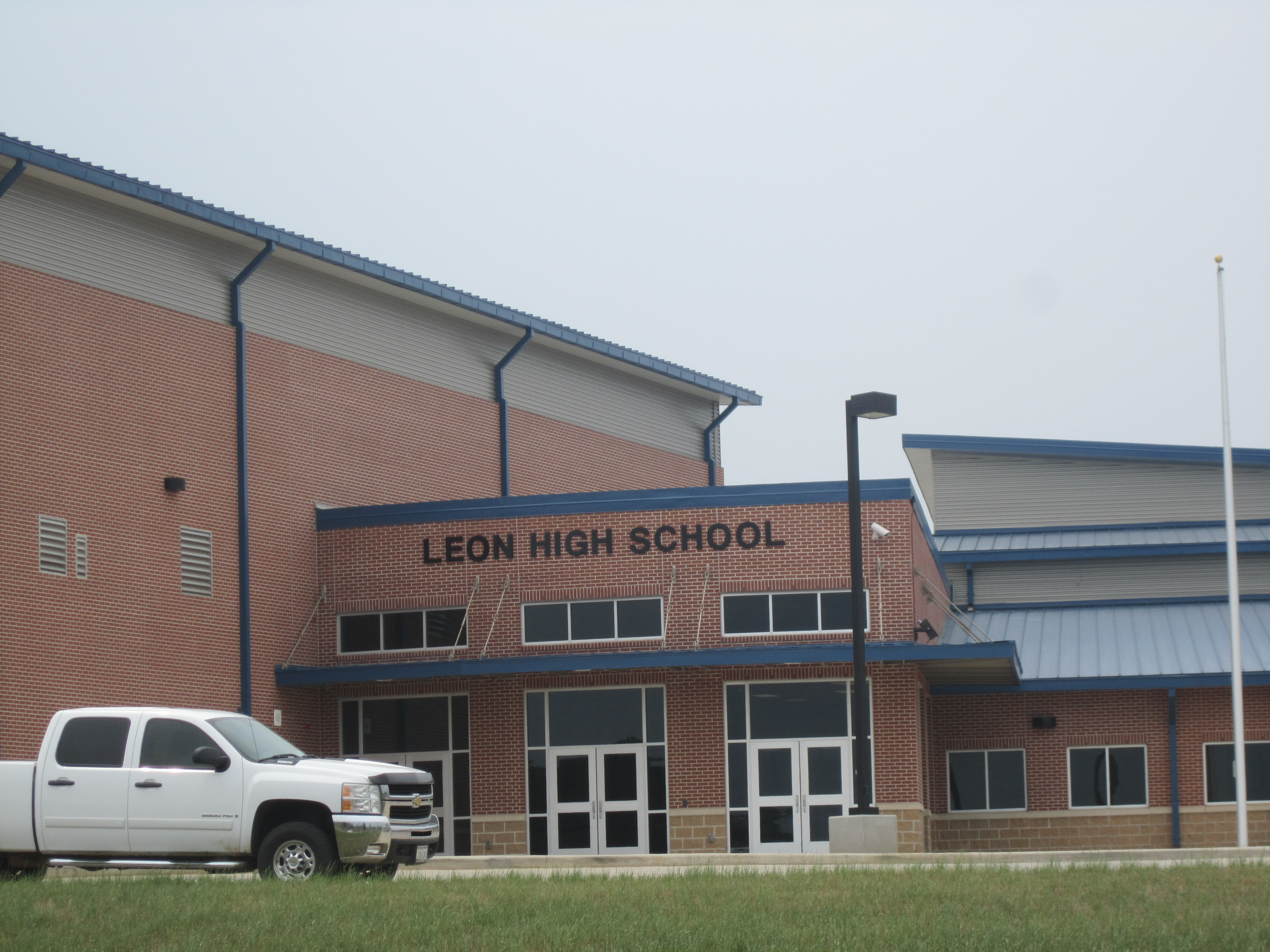
Rural Leon High School is located off U.S. Highway 79.

Leon County is a county in the U.S. state of Texas. As of the 2020 census, its population was 15,719. Its county seat is Centerville.

== History ==
The legislature of the Republic of Texas authorized Leon County in 1846 from part of Robertson County, and named it in honor of Martín de León, the founder of Victoria, Texas. However, local tradition holds that it is named for a yellow wolf of the region commonly called the león (Spanish for lion). The county was organized that same year, with its first county seat at Leona. In 1851, the county seat was moved to Centerville, since Leona was in the far southern part of the county.

The 1886 Leon County Courthouse was designed by architect George Edwin Dickey of Houston, incorporating remnants of an earlier 1858 courthouse that was destroyed by fire. The courthouse was rededicated on July 1, 2007, following a full restoration to a 1909 date.

On September 29, 1959, Braniff Airways Flight 542 crashed in Leon County, killing all 34 people on board.

== Geography ==
According to the U.S. Census Bureau, the county has a total area of 1,081 square miles (2,800 km^{2}), of which 1,073 square miles (2,780 km^{2}) are land and 7.5 square miles (19 km^{2}) (0.7%) are covered by water.

=== Major highways ===
- Interstate 45
- U.S. Highway 79
- State Highway 7
- State Highway 75
- State Highway 164
- State Highway OSR (mostly running along the south and southwestern county line of Leon County, where it borders with Madison County)
- Loop 208

=== Adjacent counties ===
- Freestone County (north)
- Anderson County (northeast)
- Houston County (east)
- Madison County (south)
- Robertson County (west)
- Limestone County (northwest)

== Demographics ==
Historical population
Census	Pop.	Note	%±
1850	1,946		—
1860	6,781		248.5%
1870	6,523		−3.8%
1880	12,817		96.5%
1890	13,841		8.0%
1900	18,072		30.6%
1910	16,583		−8.2%
1920	18,286		10.3%
1930	19,898		8.8%
1940	17,733		−10.9%
1950	12,024		−32.2%
1960	9,951		−17.2%
1970	8,738		−12.2%
1980	9,594		9.8%
1990	12,665		32.0%
2000	15,335		21.1%
2010	16,801		9.6%
2020	15,719		−6.4%
2025 (est.)	16,894	▲	7.5%
U.S. Decennial Census; 1850–2010 2010 2020

=== Racial and ethnic composition ===
Leon County, Texas – Racial and ethnic composition Note: the US Census treats Hispanic/Latino as an ethnic category. This table excludes Latinos from the racial categories and assigns them to a separate category. Hispanics/Latinos may be of any race.
Race / Ethnicity (NH = Non-Hispanic)	Pop 1980	Pop 1990	Pop 2000	Pop 2010	Pop 2020	% 1980	% 1990	% 2000	% 2010	% 2020
White alone (NH)	7,543	10,507	12,366	13,078	11,659	78.62%	82.96%	80.64%	77.84%	74.17%
Black or African American alone (NH)	1,863	1,601	1,583	1,181	921	19.42%	12.64%	10.32%	7.03%	5.86%
Native American or Alaska Native alone (NH)	7	39	45	57	54	0.07%	0.31%	0.29%	0.34%	0.34%
Asian alone (NH)	6	8	23	75	111	0.06%	0.06%	0.15%	0.45%	0.71%
Native Hawaiian or Pacific Islander alone (NH)	x	x	1	2	6	x	x	0.01%	0.01%	0.04%
Other race alone (NH)	1	1	12	1	47	0.01%	0.01%	0.08%	0.01%	0.30%
Mixed race or Multiracial (NH)	x	x	92	147	475	x	x	0.60%	0.87%	3.02%
Hispanic or Latino (any race)	174	509	1,213	2,260	2,446	1.81%	4.02%	7.91%	13.45%	15.56%
Total	9,594	12,665	15,335	16,801	15,719	100.00%	100.00%	100.00%	100.00%	100.00%

=== 2020 census ===
As of the 2020 census, the county had a population of 15,719 and a median age of 48.5 years. 21.1% of residents were under the age of 18 and 26.8% of residents were 65 years of age or older.

For every 100 females there were 98.2 males, and for every 100 females age 18 and over there were 95.9 males.

The racial makeup of the county was 78.8% White, 6.0% Black or African American, 0.7% American Indian and Alaska Native, 0.7% Asian, <0.1% Native Hawaiian and Pacific Islander, 6.3% from some other race, and 7.4% from two or more races. Hispanic or Latino residents of any race comprised 15.6% of the population.

<0.1% of residents lived in urban areas, while 100.0% lived in rural areas.

There were 6,486 households in the county, of which 26.5% had children under the age of 18 living in them. Of all households, 54.6% were married-couple households, 17.8% were households with a male householder and no spouse or partner present, and 23.4% were households with a female householder and no spouse or partner present. About 26.4% of all households were made up of individuals and 15.5% had someone living alone who was 65 years of age or older.

There were 8,895 housing units, of which 27.1% were vacant. Among occupied housing units, 81.4% were owner-occupied and 18.6% were renter-occupied. The homeowner vacancy rate was 2.5% and the rental vacancy rate was 16.7%.

=== 2000 census ===
As of the census of 2000, 15,335 people, 6,189 households, and 4,511 families were residing in the county. The population density was 14 people/mi^{2} (5.4 people/km^{2}). The 8,299 housing units averaged 8 units per square mile (3.1 units/km^{2}). The racial makeup of the county was 83.53% White, 10.39% African American, 0.34% Native American, 0.18% Asian, 4.50% from other races, and 1.06% from two or more races. About 7.91% of the population were Hispanics or Latinos of any race.

Of the 6,189 households, 28.20% had children under 18 living with them, 60.20% were married couples living together, 9.20% had a female householder with no husband present, and 27.10% were not families. About 24.80% of all households were made up of individuals, and 13.10% had someone living alone who was 65 or older. The average household size was 2.46, and the average family size was 2.92.

In the county, the age distribution was 24.3% under 18, 6.7% from 18 to 24, 23.4% from 25 to 44, 25.6% from 45 to 64, and 20.0% who were 65 or older. The median age was 42 years. For every 100 females there were 96.40 males. For every 100 females age 18 and over, there were 92.70 males.

The median income for a household in the county was $30,981, and for a family was $38,029. Males had a median income of $32,036 versus $19,607 for females. The per capita income for the county was $17,599. About 12.60% of families and 15.60% of the population were below the poverty line, including 21.20% of those under age 18 and 14.30% of those age 65 or over.

== Communities ==
=== Cities ===
- Buffalo
- Centerville (county seat)
- Jewett
- Leona
- Marquez

=== Towns ===
- Normangee (small part in Madison County)
- Oakwood (small part in Freestone County)

=== Census-designated place ===
- Hilltop Lakes

=== Unincorporated communities ===
- Concord
- Corinth
- Flynn
- Hopewell
- Wealthy

=== Ghost town ===
- Egypt

== Politics ==
Leon County is so heavily Republican that in 2014 none of the statewide GOP nominees fell below 87 percent of the votes cast.

United States presidential election results for Leon County, Texas
Year	Republican		Democratic		Third party(ies)	
Year	No.	%	No.	%	No.	%
1912	191	13.93%	856	62.44%	324	23.63%
1916	335	22.70%	979	66.33%	162	10.98%
1920	220	10.58%	1,124	54.06%	735	35.35%
1924	311	12.99%	2,004	83.71%	79	3.30%
1928	543	38.59%	862	61.27%	2	0.14%
1932	108	5.20%	1,958	94.32%	10	0.48%
1936	97	5.25%	1,748	94.69%	1	0.05%
1940	252	9.69%	2,349	90.31%	0	0.00%
1944	140	7.38%	1,569	82.67%	189	9.96%
1948	184	10.89%	1,231	72.84%	275	16.27%
1952	1,266	40.66%	1,842	59.15%	6	0.19%
1956	1,079	45.99%	1,260	53.71%	7	0.30%
1960	868	32.34%	1,803	67.18%	13	0.48%
1964	642	21.24%	2,373	78.52%	7	0.23%
1968	659	21.43%	1,536	49.95%	880	28.62%
1972	1,699	66.16%	863	33.61%	6	0.23%
1976	1,161	35.60%	2,085	63.94%	15	0.46%
1980	1,821	44.93%	2,190	54.03%	42	1.04%
1984	3,207	63.66%	1,821	36.15%	10	0.20%
1988	2,778	54.31%	2,316	45.28%	21	0.41%
1992	2,212	40.16%	2,042	37.07%	1,254	22.77%
1996	2,839	51.01%	2,217	39.83%	510	9.16%
2000	4,362	68.95%	1,893	29.92%	71	1.12%
2004	5,023	73.88%	1,754	25.80%	22	0.32%
2008	5,566	79.05%	1,418	20.14%	57	0.81%
2012	5,814	83.53%	1,062	15.26%	84	1.21%
2016	6,391	85.91%	909	12.22%	139	1.87%
2020	7,523	86.62%	1,072	12.34%	90	1.04%
2024	7,982	88.06%	1,033	11.40%	49	0.54%

United States Senate election results for Leon County, Texas1
Year	Republican		Democratic		Third party(ies)	
Year	No.	%	No.	%	No.	%
2024	7,734	85.84%	1,115	12.38%	161	1.79%

United States Senate election results for Leon County, Texas2
Year	Republican		Democratic		Third party(ies)	
Year	No.	%	No.	%	No.	%
2020	7,421	86.37%	1,028	11.96%	143	1.66%

Texas Gubernatorial election results for Leon County
Year	Republican		Democratic		Third party(ies)	
Year	No.	%	No.	%	No.	%
2022	5,108	86.74%	698	11.85%	83	1.41%

== See also ==
- National Register of Historic Places listings in Leon County, Texas
- Recorded Texas Historic Landmarks in Leon County
