= Centerville, Texas =

- City
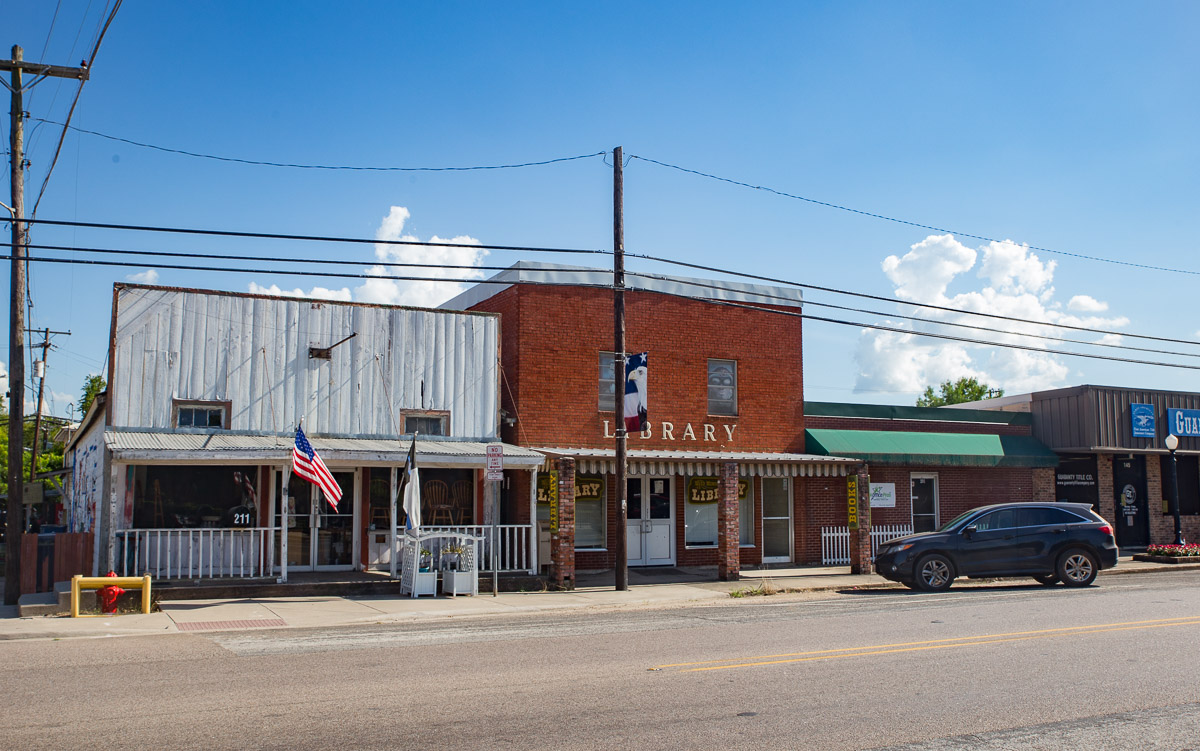
- Store fronts in Centerville

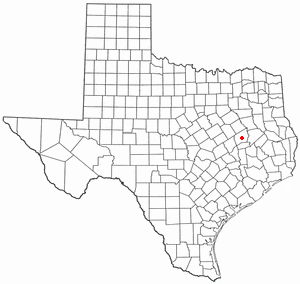
- Location of Centerville, Texas

- Coordinates: 31°15′23″N 95°58′43″W
- Country: United States
- State: Texas
- County: Leon

Area
  - Total: 1.78 sq mi (4.62 km^{2})
  - Land: 1.78 sq mi (4.62 km^{2})
  - Water: 0 sq mi (0.00 km^{2})
- Elevation: 354 ft (108 m)

Population (2020)
  - Total: 905
  - Density: 507.9/sq mi (196.12/km^{2})
- Time zone: UTC-6 (Central (CST))
  - Summer (DST): UTC-5 (CDT)
- ZIP code: 75833
- Area codes: 903, 430
- FIPS code: 48-13900
- GNIS feature ID: 2409424
- Website: centervilletx.gov

Centerville is a city in Leon County, in the U.S. state of Texas. The population was 905 at the 2020 census. It is the county seat of Leon County. Centerville was so named as it is near the geographic center of Leon County.

== History ==
Centerville became the county seat of Leon County in 1850. It was originally built on 200 acres donated by Robert J Townes and D.C. Carrington.

The town established an annual Black-Eyed Pea Festival in 1937.

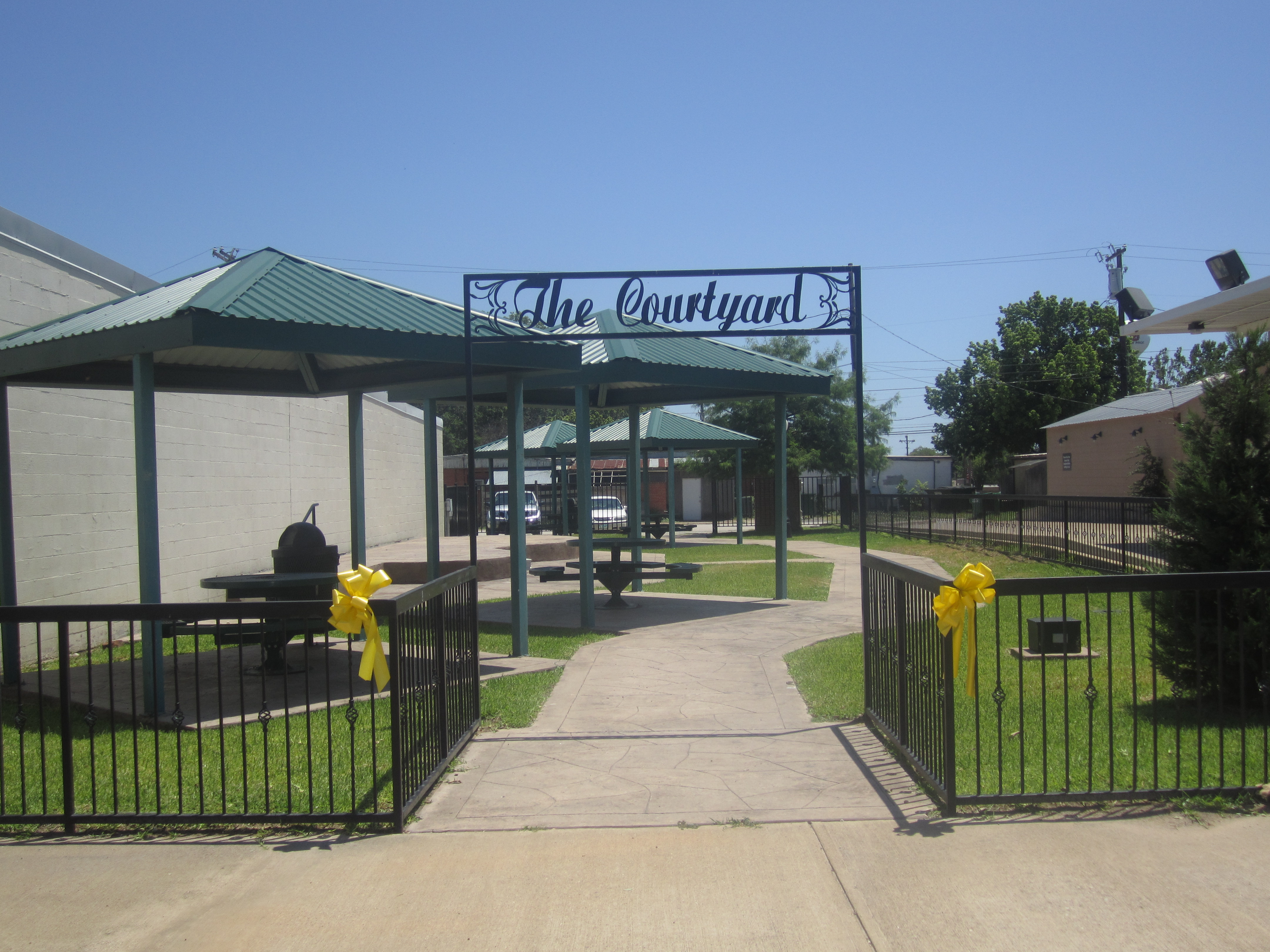
"The Courtyard" across from the Leon County Courthouse in Centerville

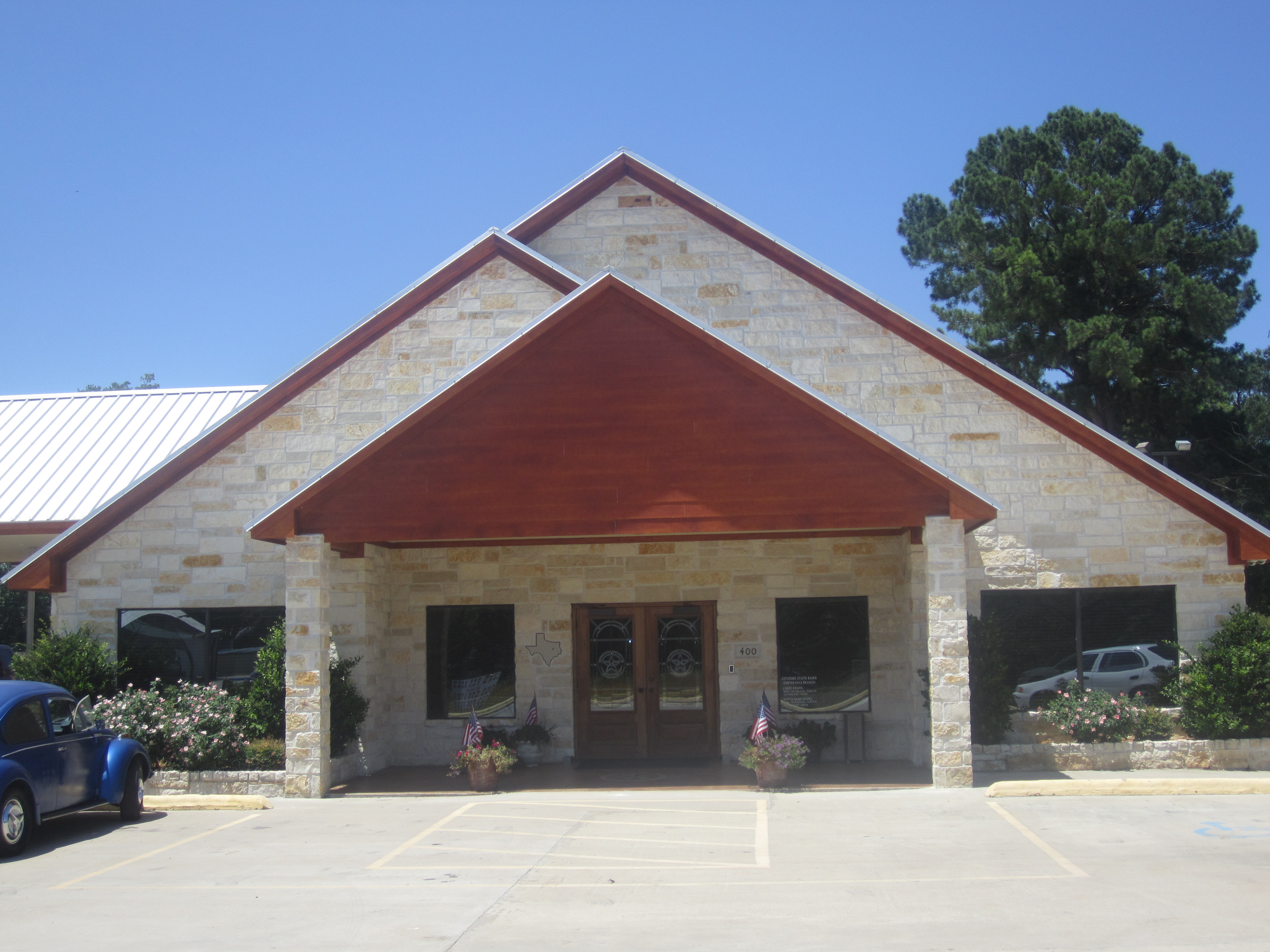
Citizens State Bank in Centerville

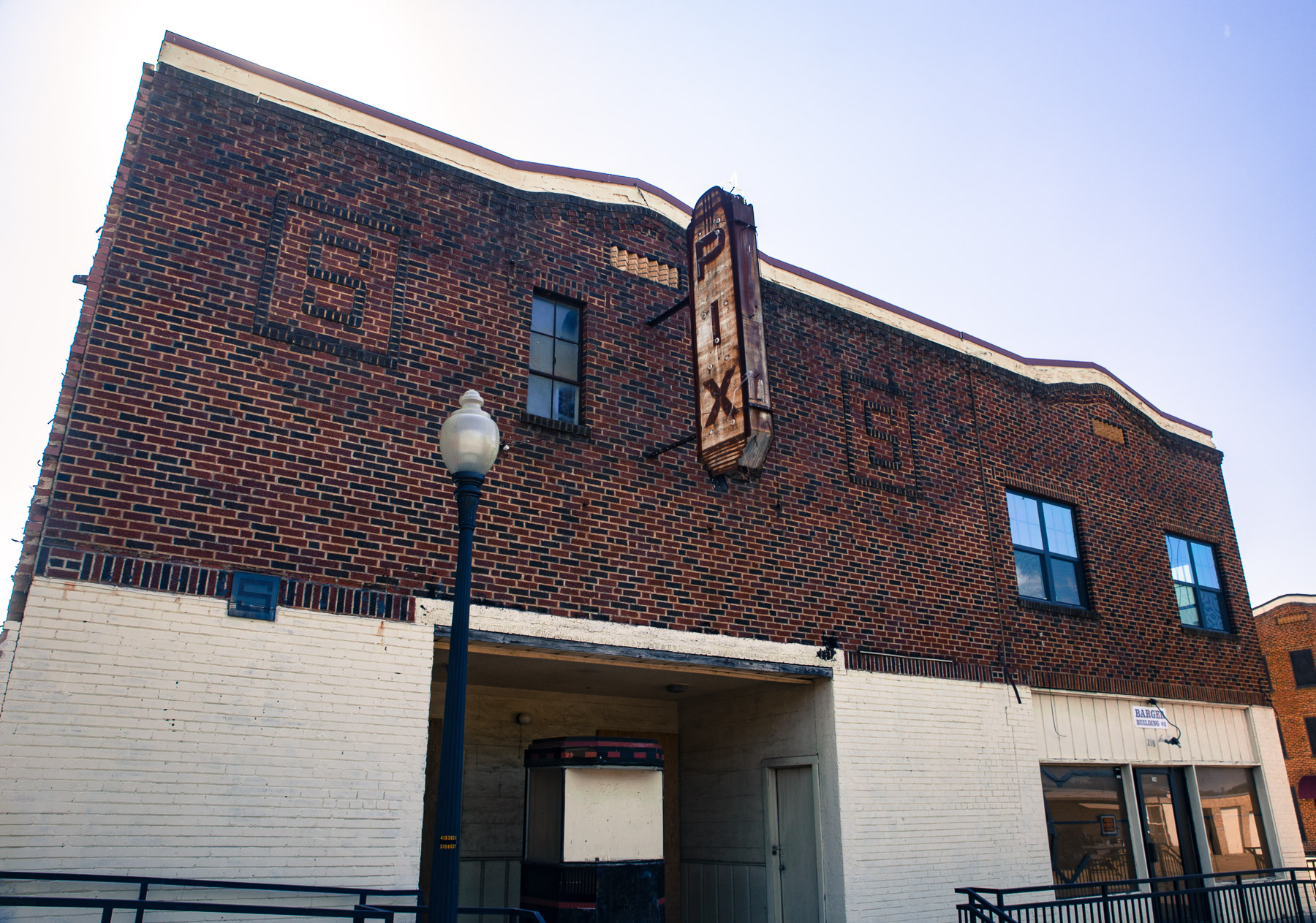
Pix Theater opened in 1941. It is now closed

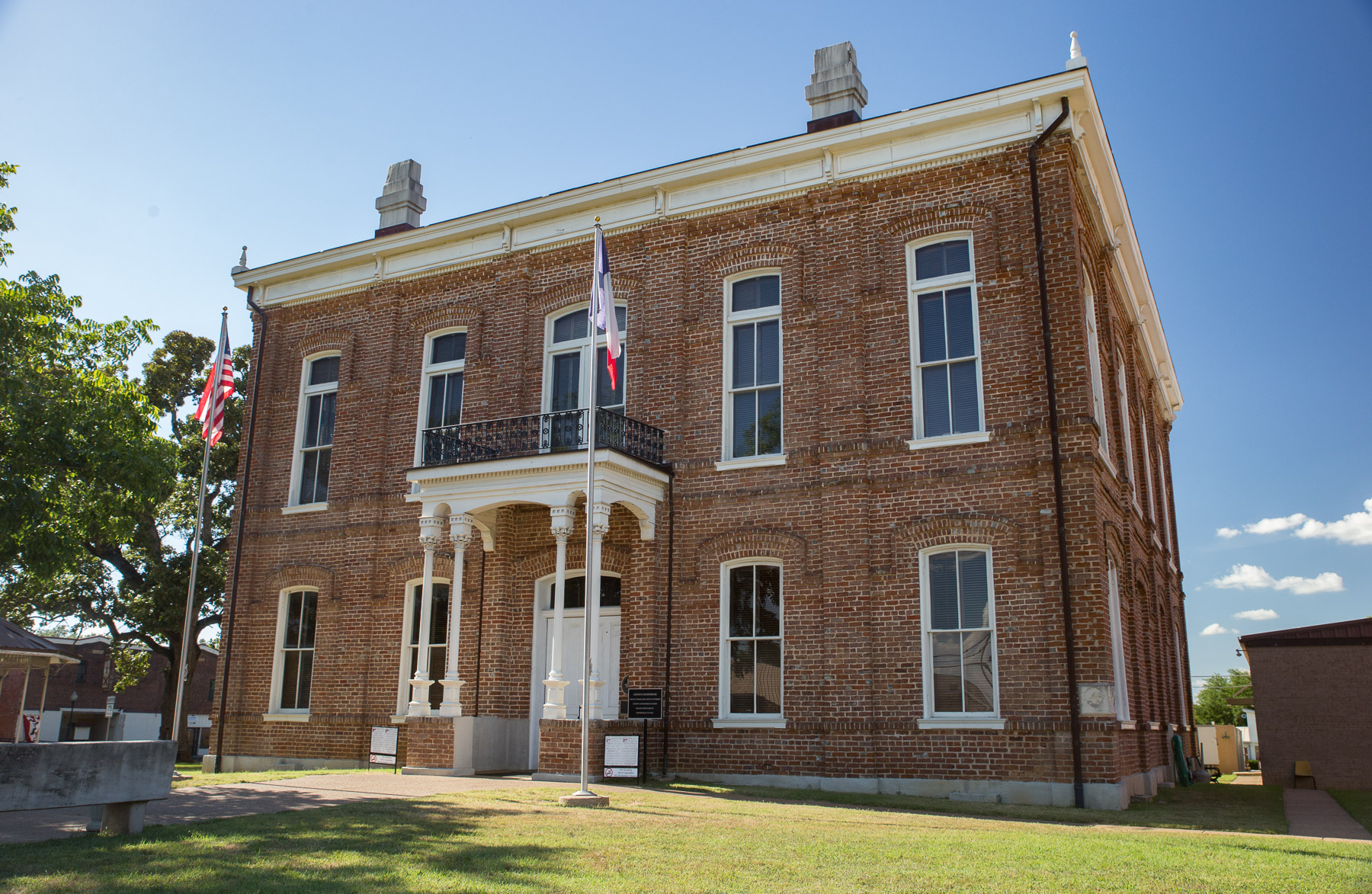
Leon County Courthouse was built in 1887

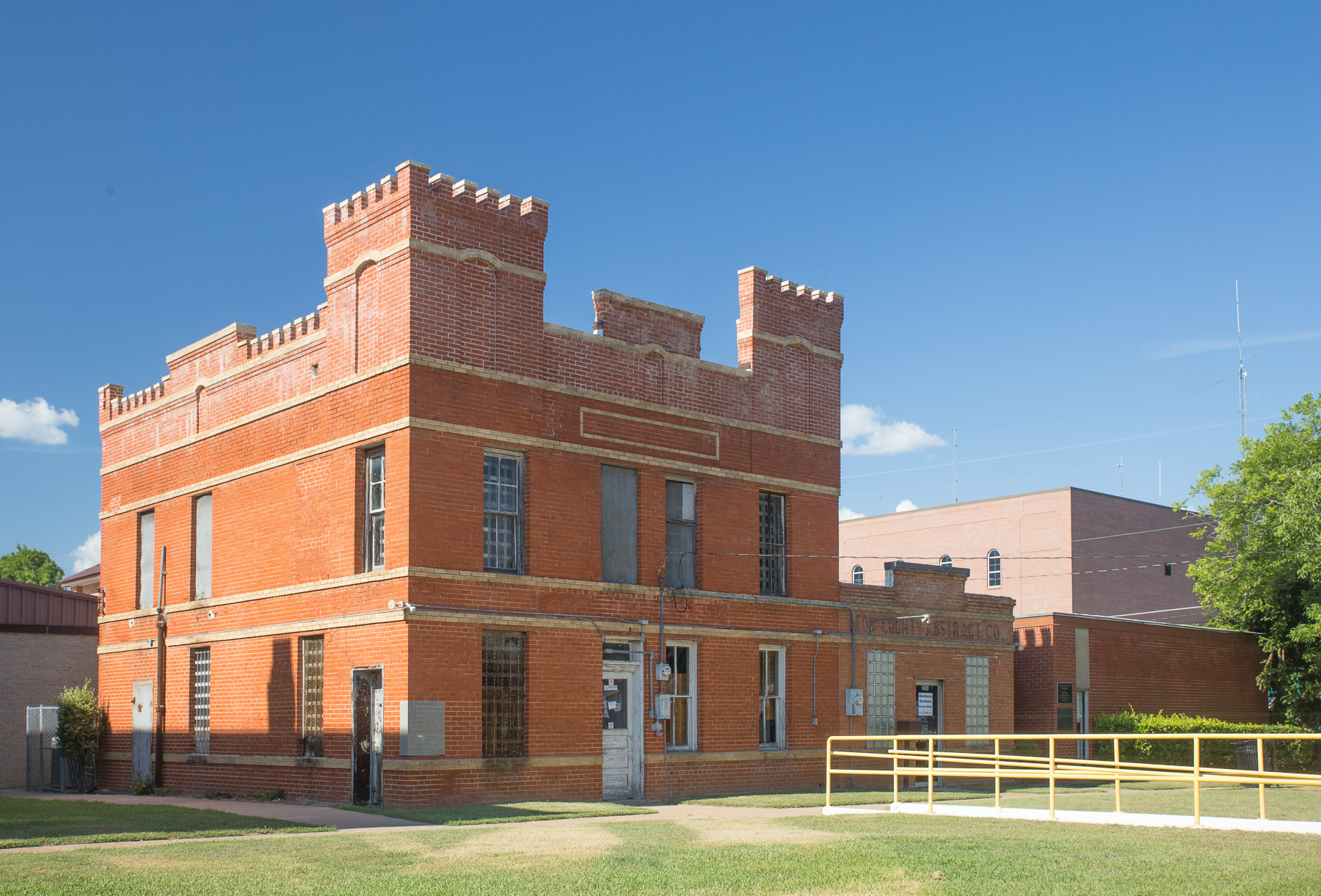
Leon County Jail is located in Centerville, Texas

== Geography ==
According to the United States Census Bureau, Centerville has a total area of 1.5 square miles (3.9 km^{2}), all land.

=== Climate ===
The climate in this area is characterized by hot, humid summers and generally mild to cool winters. According to the Köppen climate classification, Centerville has a humid subtropical climate, Cfa on climate maps. The hottest temperature recorded in Centerville was 111 °F (43.9 °C) on August 12, 1948, and July 26, 1954, while the coldest temperature recorded was −1 °F (−18 °C) on December 24, 2022.

Climate data for Centerville, Texas, 1991–2020 normals, extremes 1937–present
Month	Jan	Feb	Mar	Apr	May	Jun	Jul	Aug	Sep	Oct	Nov	Dec	Year
Record high °F (°C)	89 (32)	94 (34)	98 (37)	99 (37)	98 (37)	106 (41)	111 (44)	111 (44)	110 (43)	98 (37)	96 (36)	87 (31)	111 (44)
Mean maximum °F (°C)	76.6 (24.8)	80.0 (26.7)	84.6 (29.2)	88.2 (31.2)	92.2 (33.4)	96.5 (35.8)	99.6 (37.6)	100.7 (38.2)	97.8 (36.6)	91.3 (32.9)	83.7 (28.7)	78.2 (25.7)	101.8 (38.8)
Mean daily maximum °F (°C)	59.5 (15.3)	63.4 (17.4)	70.3 (21.3)	77.5 (25.3)	84.1 (28.9)	90.5 (32.5)	94.0 (34.4)	94.9 (34.9)	89.1 (31.7)	80.1 (26.7)	69.2 (20.7)	60.7 (15.9)	77.8 (25.4)
Daily mean °F (°C)	47.3 (8.5)	51.1 (10.6)	57.7 (14.3)	65.0 (18.3)	72.9 (22.7)	79.8 (26.6)	82.8 (28.2)	83.0 (28.3)	76.9 (24.9)	66.8 (19.3)	56.6 (13.7)	48.8 (9.3)	65.7 (18.7)
Mean daily minimum °F (°C)	35.1 (1.7)	38.9 (3.8)	45.2 (7.3)	52.4 (11.3)	61.7 (16.5)	69.1 (20.6)	71.7 (22.1)	71.0 (21.7)	64.8 (18.2)	53.5 (11.9)	44.0 (6.7)	36.9 (2.7)	53.7 (12.0)
Mean minimum °F (°C)	19.8 (−6.8)	24.3 (−4.3)	27.1 (−2.7)	35.9 (2.2)	45.9 (7.7)	60.2 (15.7)	65.2 (18.4)	63.8 (17.7)	51.1 (10.6)	37.2 (2.9)	27.0 (−2.8)	22.9 (−5.1)	17.9 (−7.8)
Record low °F (°C)	5 (−15)	0 (−18)	15 (−9)	26 (−3)	36 (2)	48 (9)	52 (11)	52 (11)	39 (4)	27 (−3)	15 (−9)	−1 (−18)	−1 (−18)
Average precipitation inches (mm)	3.47 (88)	3.22 (82)	3.90 (99)	3.11 (79)	4.65 (118)	4.00 (102)	2.47 (63)	2.71 (69)	3.22 (82)	4.22 (107)	3.63 (92)	3.81 (97)	42.41 (1,078)
Average snowfall inches (cm)	0.0 (0.0)	0.1 (0.25)	0.0 (0.0)	0.0 (0.0)	0.0 (0.0)	0.0 (0.0)	0.0 (0.0)	0.0 (0.0)	0.0 (0.0)	0.0 (0.0)	0.0 (0.0)	0.0 (0.0)	0.1 (0.25)
Average precipitation days (≥ 0.01 in)	7.0	7.6	7.1	5.6	6.6	6.8	4.7	5.3	6.1	6.0	6.9	7.9	77.6
Average snowy days (≥ 0.1 in)	0.0	0.1	0.0	0.0	0.0	0.0	0.0	0.0	0.0	0.0	0.0	0.0	0.1
Source 1: NOAA
Source 2: National Weather Service

== Demographics ==
Historical population
Census	Pop.	Note	%±
1870	221		—
1880	225		1.8%
1890	288		28.0%
1930	388		—
1940	900		132.0%
1950	961		6.8%
1960	836		−13.0%
1970	831		−0.6%
1980	799		−3.9%
1990	812		1.6%
2000	903		11.2%
2010	892		−1.2%
2020	905		1.5%
U.S. Decennial Census

=== 2020 census ===
As of the 2020 census, there were 905 people, 369 households, and 239 families residing in the city. The median age was 44.1 years, 19.8% of residents were under the age of 18, and 23.6% of residents were 65 years of age or older. For every 100 females there were 86.2 males, and for every 100 females age 18 and over there were 88.1 males age 18 and over.

0% of residents lived in urban areas, while 100.0% lived in rural areas.

There were 369 households in Centerville, of which 30.4% had children under the age of 18 living in them. Of all households, 39.0% were married-couple households, 20.3% were households with a male householder and no spouse or partner present, and 34.7% were households with a female householder and no spouse or partner present. About 32.2% of all households were made up of individuals and 15.7% had someone living alone who was 65 years of age or older.

There were 452 housing units, of which 18.4% were vacant. Among occupied housing units, 60.7% were owner-occupied and 39.3% were renter-occupied. The homeowner vacancy rate was 7.7% and the rental vacancy rate was 10.5%.

Racial composition as of the 2020 census
Race	Percent
White	78.3%
Black or African American	14.7%
American Indian and Alaska Native	0.4%
Asian	1.0%
Native Hawaiian and Other Pacific Islander	0%
Some other race	2.0%
Two or more races	3.5%
Hispanic or Latino (of any race)	7.6%

Centerville racial composition as of 2020 (NH = Non-Hispanic) (Note: Note: the US Census treats Hispanic/Latino as an ethnic category. This table excludes Latinos from the racial categories and assigns them to a separate category. Hispanics/Latinos can be of any race.)
Race	Number	Percentage
White (NH)	677	74.81%
Black or African American (NH)	133	14.7%
Asian (NH)	9	0.99%
Some Other Race (NH)	2	0.22%
Mixed/Multi-Racial (NH)	15	1.66%
Hispanic or Latino	69	7.62%
Total	905	

=== 2000 census ===
At the 2000 census, 903 people, 388 households, and 230 families were living in the city. The population density was 620.9 inhabitants per square mile (239.7/km^{2}). The 464 housing units had an average density of 319.0/sq mi (123.6/km^{2}). The racial makeup of the city was 75.30% White, 21.82% African American, 0.33% Native American, 0.22% Asian, 1.66% from other races, and 0.66% from two or more races. Hispanics or Latinos of any race were 1.99%.

Of the 388 households, 25.3% had children under 18 living with them, 46.4% were married couples living together, 10.3% had a female householder with no husband present, and 40.5% were not families. About 38.1% of households were one person, and 22.9% were one person aged 65 or older. The average household size was 2.17, and the average family size was 2.89.

The age distribution was 22.1% under 18, 6.3% from 18 to 24, 22.6% from 25 to 44, 25.0% from 45 to 64, and 23.9% 65 or older. The median age was 44 years. For every 100 females, there were 83.9 males. For every 100 females age 18 and over, there were 77.5 males.

The median income for a household was $25,677 and for a family was $35,278. Males had a median income of $38,125 versus $19,167 for females. The per capita income for the city was $15,469. About 14.9% of families and 19.1% of the population were below the poverty line, including 19.7% of those under age 18 and 20.9% of those age 65 or over.

== Education ==
The City of Centerville is served by the Centerville Independent School District.

== Notable people ==
- Marva Black Beck, Texas state representative
- Lightnin' Hopkins, blues singer
- Mike McKinney, mayor, Texas state representative, and the 13th chancellor of the Texas A&M University System
