= Margaret Lea Houston =

First Lady of the Republic of Texas (1819–1867)

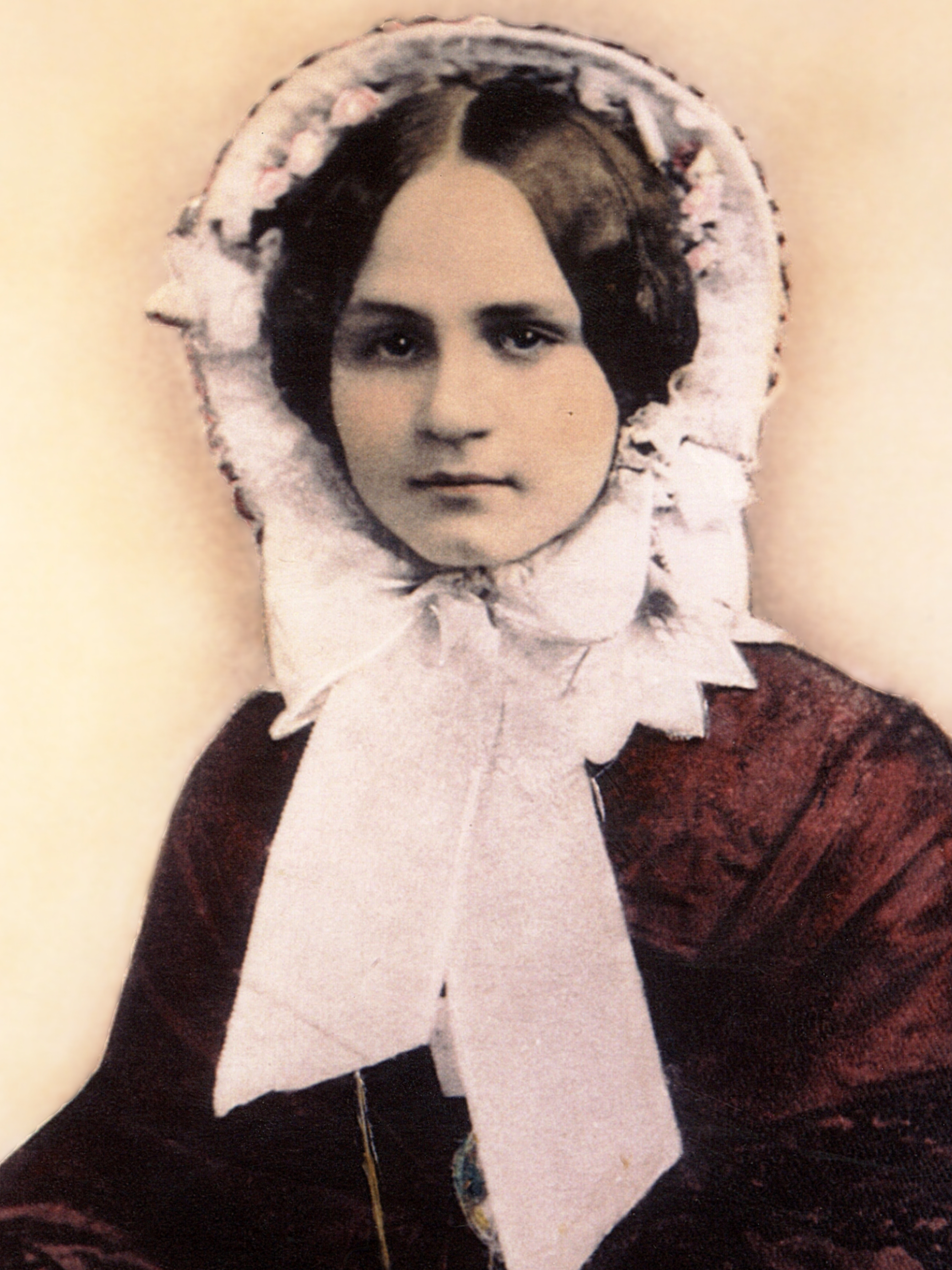
- Margaret Lea Houston, c. 1839

First Lady of Texas
- In role December 21, 1859 – March 15, 1861
- Governor: Sam Houston
- Preceded by: Lucadia Christiana Niles Pease
- Succeeded by: Martha Melissa Evans Clark

First Lady of the Republic of Texas
- In role December 21, 1841 – December 9, 1844
- President: Sam Houston
- Preceded by: Hannah Este Burnet
- Succeeded by: Mary Smith Jones

Personal details
- Born: Margaret Moffette Lea; April 11, 1819 Marion, Alabama, U.S.
- Died: December 3, 1867 (aged 48) Independence, Texas, U.S.
- Resting place: Houston-Lea Family Cemetery; Independence, Texas, U.S.
- Spouse: Sam Houston (m. 1840; died 1863)
- Children: 8, including Sam Jr., Andrew, and Temple
- Education: Judson Female Institute

Margaret Lea Houston (April 11, 1819 – December 3, 1867) was First Lady of the Republic of Texas during her husband Sam Houston's second term as President of the Republic of Texas. They met following the first of his two non-consecutive terms as the Republic's president, and married when he was a representative in the Congress of the Republic of Texas. She was his third wife, remaining with him until his death.

She came from a close-knit family in Alabama, many of whom also moved to Texas when she married the man who was an accomplished politician in both Tennessee and Texas, and who had won the Battle of San Jacinto during the Texas Revolution. The couple had eight children, and she gave birth to most of them while he was away attending to politics. Her mother Nancy Lea was a constant in their lives, helping with the children, managing the household help, and always providing either financial assistance or temporary housing. With the help of her extended family in Texas, Margaret convinced her husband to give up both alcohol and profane language. He believed his wife to be an exemplary woman of faith and, under her influence, converted to the Baptist denomination, after he had many years earlier been baptized a Catholic in Nacogdoches, Texas.

Following the Annexation of Texas to the United States, Sam Houston shuttled back and forth to Washington, D.C. as the state's U.S. senator for 13 years, while Margaret remained in Texas raising their children. When he was elected the state's governor, Margaret became First Lady of the state of Texas and was pregnant with their last child. Her brief tenure came on the cusp of the Civil War, at a time when the state was torn apart over the debate of whether or not to secede from the United States, while her husband worked in vain to defeat the Texas Ordinance of Secession. There was an attempt on his life, and angry mobs gathered in the streets near the governor's mansion. With no government protection provided, she lived in fear for her family's safety.

Her husband was removed from office by the Texas Secession Convention for refusing to swear loyalty to the Confederacy. Margaret became a wartime mother, whose eldest son joined the Confederate Army and was taken prisoner at the Battle of Shiloh. Her husband died before the end of the war. In her few remaining years, she became the keeper of the Sam Houston legacy and opened his records to a trusted biographer. When she died of yellow fever four and a half years later, Margaret could not be buried with her husband in a public cemetery in Huntsville for fear of contamination, and was instead interred next to her mother on private property.

== Early life ==
Margaret Moffette Lea was born April 11, 1819, into a family of devout Baptists in Perry County, Alabama. Her father Temple Lea was a church deacon and the state treasurer of the Alabama Baptist Convention, and her mother Nancy Moffette Lea was the only woman delegate at the convention's formation. Margaret was the fifth of six children that included older brothers Martin, Henry Clinton and Vernal, older sister Varilla, and younger sister Antoinette. The Lea cotton plantation had been acquired with money from a Moffette family inheritance, and was operated by Nancy.

When her father died in 1834, she inherited five slaves: Joshua, Eliza, her favorite, Viannah, Charlotte and Jackson. The older Lea children had married prior to Temple's death, but Vernal, Margaret and Antoinette accompanied the widowed Nancy when she moved into her son Henry's home at Marion. He was an accomplished attorney who sat on the boards of educational institutions, and would be elected to the Alabama State Senate in 1836. Margaret was enrolled at Professor McLean's School, and also attended Judson Female Institute. The latter was founded by Baptists to instruct genteel young women in what were considered acceptable goals of their time and place, "proficiency in needlework, dancing, drawing, and penmanship". Heavy emphasis was put on Baptist theology and missionary work. She wrote poetry and read romantic novels, while also becoming accomplished on guitar, harp and piano. Reverend Peter Crawford baptized her in the Siloam Baptist Church of Marion when she was 19, by which time the eligible young lady was considered "accomplished, well-connected and deeply religious".

== Marriage ==
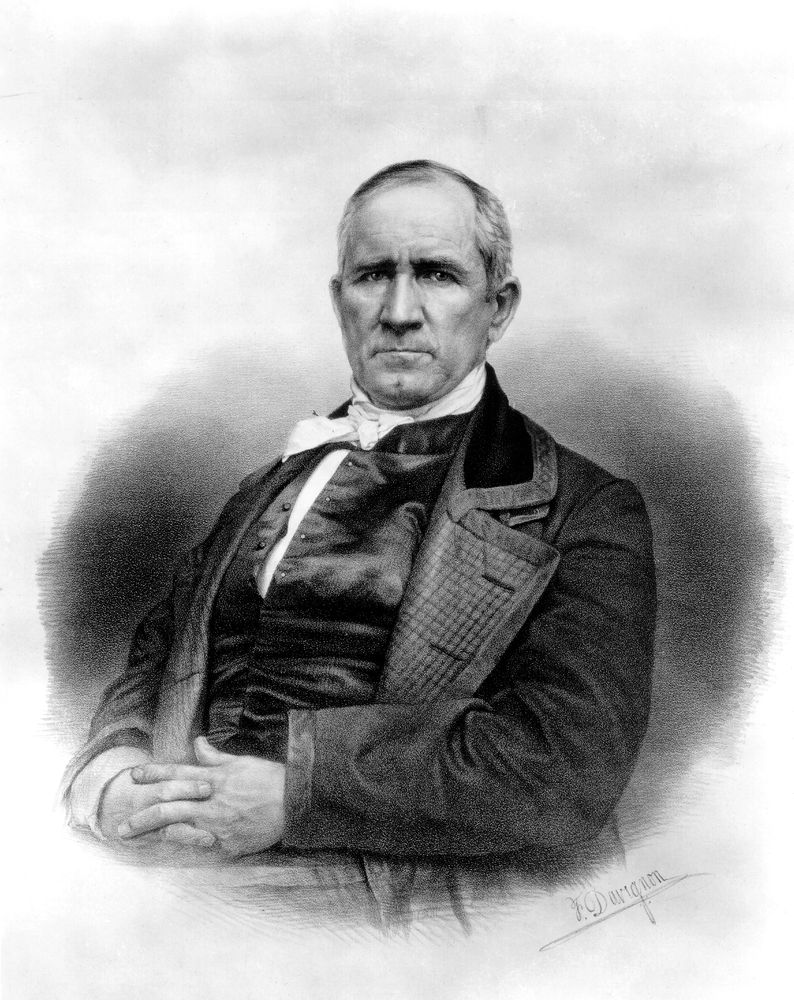
Sam Houston in 1848

Sam Houston was an attorney by profession and politically accomplished even before he moved to Texas. In Tennessee, he had been both a member of the United States House of Representatives and governor. His military victory at the Battle of San Jacinto elevated him to hero status in Texas. After completing his first term as President of the Republic of Texas in early December 1838, he continued to practice law from his office in Liberty. He arrived in Mobile, Alabama, in the early months of 1839 as a partner of the Sabine City Company, seeking investors to develop a community that is today known as Sabine Pass. Through Martin Lea, he made the acquaintance of Antoinette's husband William Bledsoe, a wealthy businessman who in turn suggested Nancy Lea as a possible investor. Invited to a garden party at Martin's home, it was there Houston first became acquainted with Margaret. The mutual attraction was instantaneous.

Nancy was favorably impressed with Houston's land sales pitch, but not so impressed with his interest in her daughter. She and others in the family were concerned about his reputation as a hard-drinking carouser with a proclivity for profanity, who was 26 years older than Margaret and twice married. Several weeks of love letters had been exchanged between Margaret and Houston by the time he proposed marriage that summer of 1839, presenting her with his image carved on a brooch. In an effort to assuage the family's opposition to the union, Houston spent several weeks in the Lea home in Alabama.

In September during his absence from Texas, his supporters in San Augustine County elected him to serve in the Republic of Texas House of Representatives. When the couple's engagement was announced in newspapers, the Leas were not the only ones who were skeptical. Acquaintances in Texas were well versed with his personal history and aware that he only recently obtained a divorce from his first wife, Eliza Allen of Gatlin, TN. The original divorce paperwork, in 1829, was lost and not filed; Houston was unaware until 1837 so he filed the paperwork immediately to finalize his divorce. He had hopes of marrying a Texas woman, Anna Raguet, as it played out she rejected him for his friend Mr. Irion. Political crony Barnard E. Bee Sr. tried to discourage him from making a third attempt at marriage, believing him to be "totally disqualified for domestic happiness".

As the day of their May 9, 1840, wedding approached, some family members still looked upon Houston with uncertainty and were determined to stop what they believed would be a disastrous union for Margaret. She would not be deterred, however, and the Reverend Peter Crawford officiated over the wedding of Margaret and the man with whom she had fallen in love. The newlyweds spent their honeymoon week at the Lafayette Hotel before sailing to Galveston, where Nancy and the Bledsoes had already established residencies. Houston retained a house he owned in the city named for him, but Margaret had no taste for the hustle and bustle and preferred the lesser-populated Galveston. She and her personal slaves, who had accompanied the newlyweds from Alabama, shared her mother's house while Houston traveled.

== First Lady of the Republic ==
The year before he met Margaret, Houston had purchased property at Cedar Point on Galveston Bay in Chambers County, which he named Raven Moor, and planned to expand with income from his law practice. The existing two-room log dogtrot house with its detached slave quarters overlooked Galveston Bay and became the newlyweds' first home, filled with both Margaret's personal furnishings from Alabama, as well as newer pieces. She renamed it Ben Lomond as a tip of the hat to the romantic Walter Scott works she had read, and delegated management of the household to her mother Nancy.

She, by her great good sense and excellent management, had gained complete control over the general, and it is to her we owe as great a debt of gratitude ... for it was owing to her wonderful influence over him that Texas received the benefaction of his great mind. After he married her he quit all of his old habits and dissipation and became a new man.

— Dr. John W. Lockhart, author and Houston family friend

During his second term as representative from San Augustine, Houston was elected in 1841 to once again serve as the Republic's president. Margaret disliked campaign events and, giving up her privacy, so she frequently stayed home while her husband traveled about the Republic canvassing for votes. Yet, when she rose to the occasion, such as the extended post-election tour of San Augustine County and victory celebrations in Washington County and Houston City, the public adored her, and she became an impressive political asset. She rode in a local presidential parade, but stayed home rather than travel to the inauguration in Austin. When the couple appeared at several events in Nacogdoches, his old friends took notice of his total avoidance of alcohol, and he continued to assure her that he was giving it up completely. He also began to clean up his language to please his new wife, and would eventually claim to have eliminated his profanity altogether.

Approximately 26 miles (42 km) north of Ben Lomond, the Bledsoes operated a sugar cane plantation at Grand Cane in Liberty County. Financially supplemented by Nancy, the plantation became a family gathering place. About a year after Vernal and Mary Lea also moved there, Mary suffered a pregnancy miscarriage. Not long after that, the couple accepted trusteeship of a 7-year-old Galveston orphan named Susan Virginia Thorne, who was then placed in the care of Nancy. It was a problematic relationship from the beginning, and would grow to have legal ramifications for Margaret.

Events leading up to the 1842 Battle of Salado Creek caused Houston to believe that Mexico was planning a full-scale invasion to re-take Texas. In response, he moved the Republic's capital farther east to Washington-on-the-Brazos, and sent Margaret back to her relatives in Alabama. Upon her later return, they temporarily lived with the Lockhart family at Washington-on-the-Brazos until they were able to acquire a small home there. The couple's first child Sam Houston Jr. was born in the new house on May 25, 1843. Upon learning of her son Martin's death in a duel, Nancy moved in with the Houstons, helping Margaret with the new baby, and over Houston's objections, pitching in with some financial assistance for food and household necessities.

== Extended family life ==
=== Raven Hill and Woodland ===
When his presidential term ended on December 9, 1844, Houston turned his attention to the Raven Hill plantation he had acquired that year northwest of Grand Cane and east of Huntsville. Margaret's slave Joshua was put in charge of the carpentry to build her a new house. Nancy, Margaret and sister Antoinette devoted their time to activities in Grand Cane's Concord Baptist Church, of which they were founding members. She continued to be a wife who was happiest when she and her husband stayed close to home. Although she accompanied him to President Andrew Jackson's Tennessee funeral in the summer of 1845, she did not attend fetes held in her husband's honor by his old friends and supporters. During the latter part of the year, Antoinette's husband William died, followed a few months later by the death of Vernal's wife Mary. Prior to her death, she had elicited a promise from Margaret to assume the trusteeship of Susan Virginia Thorne.

Texas officially relinquished its sovereignty on February 19, 1846, to become the 28th state in the union, and Houston was elected by the Texas State Legislature to serve in the United States Senate. (Note: Article 1, Section III of the United States Constitution states "The Senate of the United States shall be composed of two Senators from each State, chosen by the Legislature thereof, for six Years; and each Senator shall have one Vote." Election by popular vote of individuals in a given state did not come about until the Seventeenth Amendment to the United States Constitution was ratified on April 8, 1913."Constitution of the United States". United States Senate. United States government.) Margaret's pregnancy prevented her from accompanying him, so when time and duty permitted he traveled back and forth between Texas and a temporary hotel residence in the nation's capital. When Reverend George W. Samson first met Houston at the E-Street Baptist Church in Washington, D.C., the senator told him that his attendance had been influenced by "one of the best Christians on earth", his wife Margaret. For the duration of his senatorial service, Houston regularly attended the E-Street church, sharing his wife's letters with Samson and delving into theological discussions pertaining to Margaret's interpretation of scriptures.

Margaret's sister Antoinette eloped with wealthy Galveston businessman Charles Power in April and began a new life on his sugar plantation. Houston was home during a Congressional recess when their second child Nancy (Nannie) Elizabeth Houston was born at Raven Hill on September 6. About this time, in a letter to Houston that gave insight into Nancy's forceful constant presence in their lives, Margaret conceded, "She is high spirited and a little overbearing, I admit ..." but advised her husband to just give in to the insignificant issues. Houston replied, "I love the old Lady as a Mother, and have resolved to defer to her age and her disposition. Her blood is much like my own."

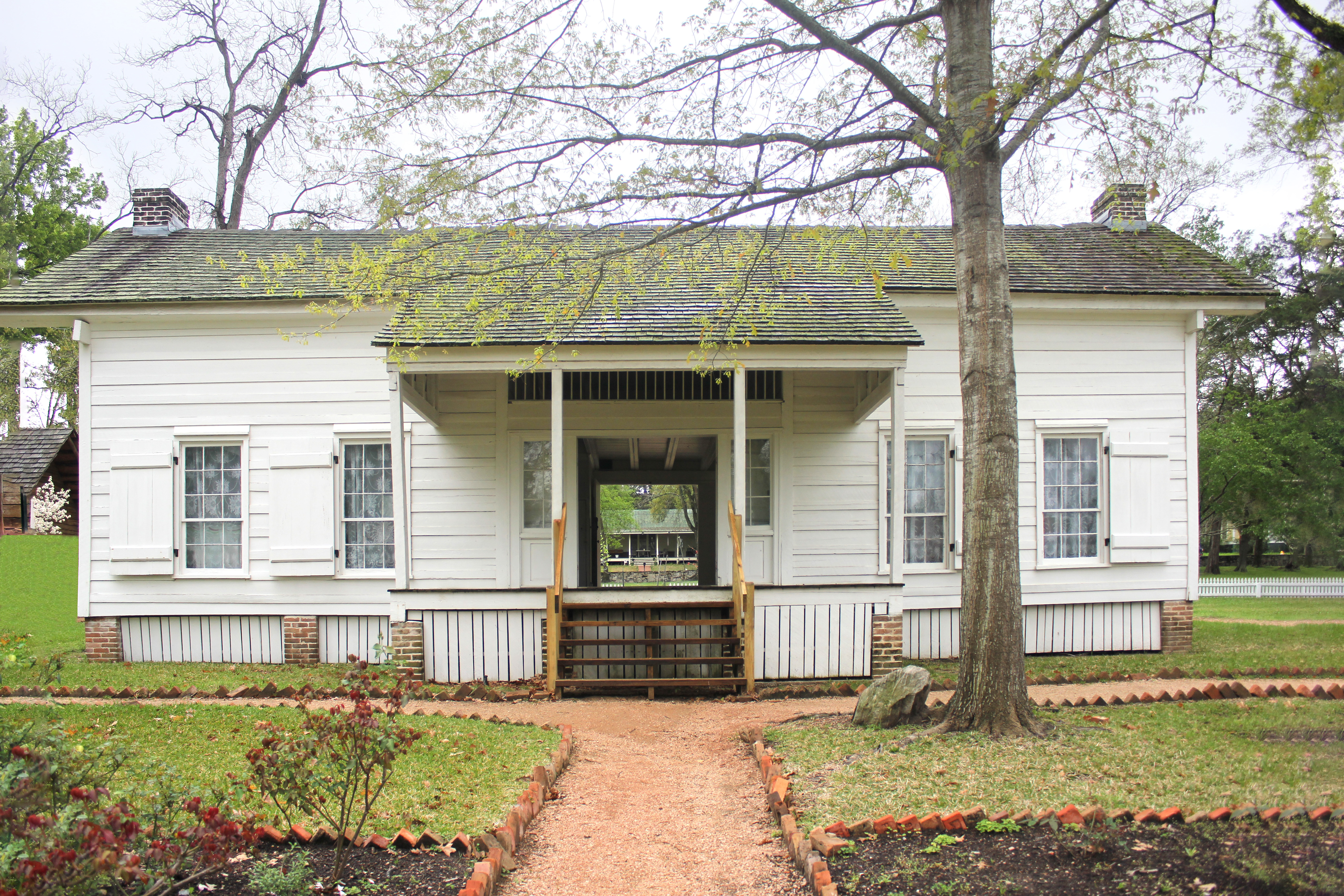
Woodland home

During the early part of 1847, Houston's letters to Margaret were filled with his weariness of being away from home, and his concern that he had no letters from her for weeks. He promised that at the end of the current legislative session, he would "... fly with all speed to meet and greet my Love and embrace our little ones." When she finally answered, she initially only told him of a serious illness that Sam Jr. had since recovered from, even though he was aware of previous problems she had with a breast lump. She had been advised to see a specialist in Memphis, Tennessee, if there was a recurrence. When complications appeared, family friend Dr. Ashbel Smith recommended surgery in Texas; only then, did she inform her husband of the situation. Upon receipt of communication from her, Houston immediately departed Washington, D.C. (Note: Given the severity of the situation and how quickly Sam headed for home, it is likely that they communicated via telegraph, rather than postal mail across the over 1,200-mile distance between them. Roberts (1993), pp. 142–151;""What Hath God Wrought" The House and the Telegraph | US House of Representatives: History, Art & Archives". history.house.gov. US House of Representatives.)

After his return home, Houston negotiated a labor-swap arrangement with Raven Hill's overseer Captain Frank Hatch. In lieu of a cash payment for Hatch's services, the bulk of Houston's slave labor force was engaged to work on Hatch's property at Bermuda Spring. The remaining slaves were retained as house labor for Margaret. Eventually, Houston became the owner of Bermuda Spring when he and Hatch swapped properties, and he set about to build the Woodland home for his wife. The first child to be born in the house was Margaret (Maggie) Lea Houston, arriving on April 13, 1848, while Congress was in session and Houston was in Washington.

The widowed Vernal remarried to Catherine Davis Goodall in 1849, but trusteeship of Susan Virginia Thorne, by now a teenager, remained with Margaret. With most of his time spent in the nation's capital, Houston's perception of Thorne was primarily second-hand gleanings from Margaret's letters; yet, he disliked and distrusted the orphaned girl to the point where he feared for the health and safety of his children with her in the house. Exacerbating the situation was Margaret's disapproval of the relationship that the teenage girl developed with overseer Thomas Gott. Push literally came to shove during an incident in which Margaret disciplined her for what she believed was rough handling of one of the children. Thorne alleged that during the ensuing dispute over the situation, Margaret had used threats and physical violence against her. After Thorne eloped with Gott a month later, the couple filed assault and battery charges against Margaret. When a grand jury investigation resulted in a deadlock, the matter was referred to the local Baptist church that Margaret helped found, and she was acquitted of the charges. Houston came to believe that the filing of legal charges against his wife had been encouraged by his political enemies.

Daughter Mary William (Mary Willie) Houston was born on April 9, 1850, in the Woodland house, during another Congressional session when Houston was in Washington. Their fourth child Antoinette (Nettie) Power Houston arrived on January 20, 1852, while he was again away on a business trip.

Many friends and acquaintances came to visit the Houstons at Woodland, including members of the Alabama-Coushatta Tribe who had allied with Houston during the Texas Revolution; he in return had assisted them in their being granted a reservation in east Texas. Throughout the last years of his presidency, Houston had made numerous efforts for the Republic to find common ground with the various tribes, asserting their right to own land. Many tribes had come to respect him as their friend.

=== Breast cancer and surgery ===
After Sam Houston Jr. was born in 1843, Margaret complained of tenderness in her right breast, which was not treated until early 1847. She wrote to Houston: "I have suffered two or three mails to without writing to you for the reason that my breast was in such condition that I could not write without detriment to myself. It has risen three times and the last time presented such an angry appearance that Brother Charles prevailed on us to send for Dr. Smith". At first Dr. Smith recommended a topical treatment, partially because her husband was not there and it did not resemble breast cancers he had previously seen. When the pain worsened, Smith noticed the tumor had inflammed and scheduled her for a surgery. Smith brought whiskey to help dull her senses during the surgery, as anesthesia was not yet used in American surgeries. Margaret refused to drink, aligning with her teetotaler beliefs, and instead bit down on a silver coin as Smith performed a radical mastectomy on her right breast. Smith later wrote about the surgery to Houston, "It was with some anxiety that I undertook so serious an operation in your absence, but an operation offered the only possible cure and its necessity was urgent." Margaret did have an infection afterwards, but recovered.

=== Sam Houston's profession of faith ===
Nancy moved southwest of Huntsville to Independence in 1852, and much of the remaining Lea family began to form its nucleus in the Washington County community. Antoinette and Charles Power were also living in Independence after their Galveston sugar plantation was decimated by a hurricane. Brothers Vernal and Henry both died that year. The following year, Varilla's husband Robertus Royston also died and she joined the rest of the family in Independence. That August, the Houstons bought a house near the original Baylor University campus in Independence. While Houston was attending to business in Washington, their sixth child Andrew Jackson Houston was born on June 21, 1854.

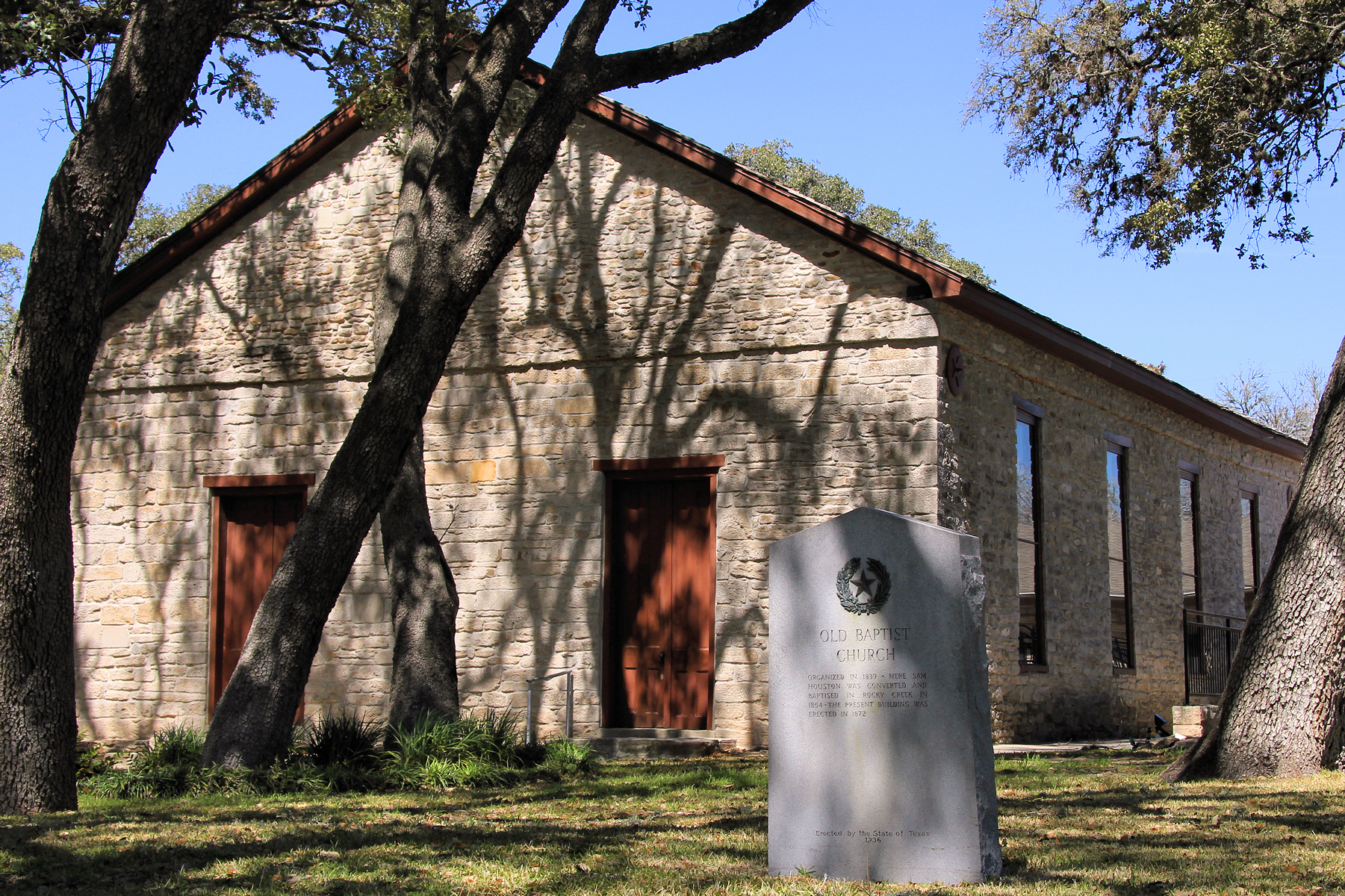
The old Baptist church in Independence, Texas, where Sam Houston professed his faith

As required by Mexican federal law for property ownership in Coahuila y Tejas, Houston had been baptized into the Catholic faith in the Adolphus Sterne House in Nacogdoches prior to Texas independence. By 1854, when Houston told Reverend Samson he felt compelled to make a public profession of faith, perhaps on the floor of the United States Senate, Margaret and her family had spent 14 years influencing her husband's faith. Ultimately, he decided to make the profession among those who knew him best in Texas.

Word quickly spread about Houston's upcoming public baptism, and spectators traveled from neighboring communities to witness the event. Reverend Rufus Columbus Burleson, the president of Baylor University and local church pastor, performed the rite in Little Rocky Creek, 2 miles (3.2 km) southeast of town. Houston afterwards still felt unworthy of taking the Eucharist and becoming a member of Margaret's church. In gratitude and celebration, Nancy sold her silverware to purchase a bell for the Rocky Creek Baptist Church. At her request, Reverend George Washington Baines of Brenham counseled with him to eliminate his self-doubts. Baines, who was the maternal great-grandfather of President Lyndon B. Johnson, maintained a close friendship with Sam Houston for the rest of Houston's life. Baines' son Joseph Wilson Baines served in the Texas state legislature, and was the father of Rebekah Baines, mother of Lyndon Johnson.

== First Lady of the state ==
The state legislature decided during Houston's third senatorial term not to re-elect him, so he ran for the office of Governor of Texas, losing to Hardin Richard Runnels. He was still in Washington when William (Willie) Rogers Houston was born on May 25, 1858, their last child born in the Woodland home. In order to satisfy creditors of his gubernatorial campaign debts, Houston was forced to sell the house to his political supporter J. Carroll Smith. He subsequently defeated incumbent Runnels with a second bid for the office during a period when the populace was bitterly divided over the issue of secession from the United States, and was sworn on December 31, 1859.

Gen'l Houston seems cheerful and hopeful through the day, but in the still watches of the night I see him agonizing in prayers for our distracted country. God's people are offering up the same prayer throughout the whole land. Will He not hear those prayers?

— Margaret Lea Houston letter to Nancy Lea, January 21, 1861

Construction on the Texas Governor's Mansion in Austin had been completed three years earlier and first occupied by Governor Elisha M. Pease, whose wife played hostess to anyone who stopped by for a visit. The Houston family and their retinue of slaves moved into the mansion during a political climate that grew increasingly hostile over the secession debate. The family furniture had been moved from Independence by Joshua, since the state government had no budget for staffing, furnishing or maintaining the governor's residence. That financial burden fell on the shoulders of the incumbent, and the state partially defaulted on Houston's salary. Margaret feared for the family's safety, as her husband worked towards defeating passage of the state's Ordinance of Secession. There had been a botched assassination attempt on Houston, and she saw throngs of angry malcontents gathering in the city. Margaret closed the mansion doors to all but those with an invitation from the Houstons.

The family and household slaves resided on the second floor of the mansion, while others lived in the stable. As with everywhere else had they lived, she cared nothing about public life, and instead worked with Eliza and the other servants to create a home that welcomed extended family members and personal friends of the Houstons. Houston would occasionally hire out some of his labor force. The first child born in the Texas governor's mansion was also the last of the Houston children; Temple Lea Houston was delivered on August 12, 1860. This last birth left the 41-year-old Margaret debilitated for almost two weeks, with a watchful Houston constantly by her side.

The Texas Secession Convention passed the Texas Ordinance of Secession on February 1, 1861, effectively becoming part of the Confederate States of America on March 1. Houston, like all other office holders in the state, was expected to take an oath of loyalty to the Confederacy. He refused and was removed from office by the Secession Convention on March 16, succeeded by Lieutenant Governor Edward Clark.

== Final years ==
Their home in Independence having been leased out to the Baptists, retreating there was not an option. Houston was in poor health, as well as spiritually and financially broken. After a brief sojourn in Nancy's home, and over her objections, the family returned to Ben Lomond in early April.

Sometime during August 1861, Sam Houston, Jr., enlisted in the Confederate States Army 2nd Texas Infantry Regiment, Company C Bayland Guards, sending Margaret into melancholia. She dreaded that her first-born child would never be home again. "My heart seems almost broken ... what shall I do? How shall I bear it? When I first heard the news, I thought I would lie down and die", she wrote to her mother. Houston tried to help out by assuming care of their other children in between his extended visits to Galveston. Her fears seemed well-founded when her son was critically wounded and left for dead at the April 1862 Battle of Shiloh. A second bullet was stopped by his Bible, bearing an inside inscription from Margaret. He was found languishing in a field by a Union Army clergyman who picked up the Bible and also found a letter from Margaret in his pocket. Taken prisoner and sent to Camp Douglas in Illinois, he was later released in a prisoner exchange and received a medical discharge in October.

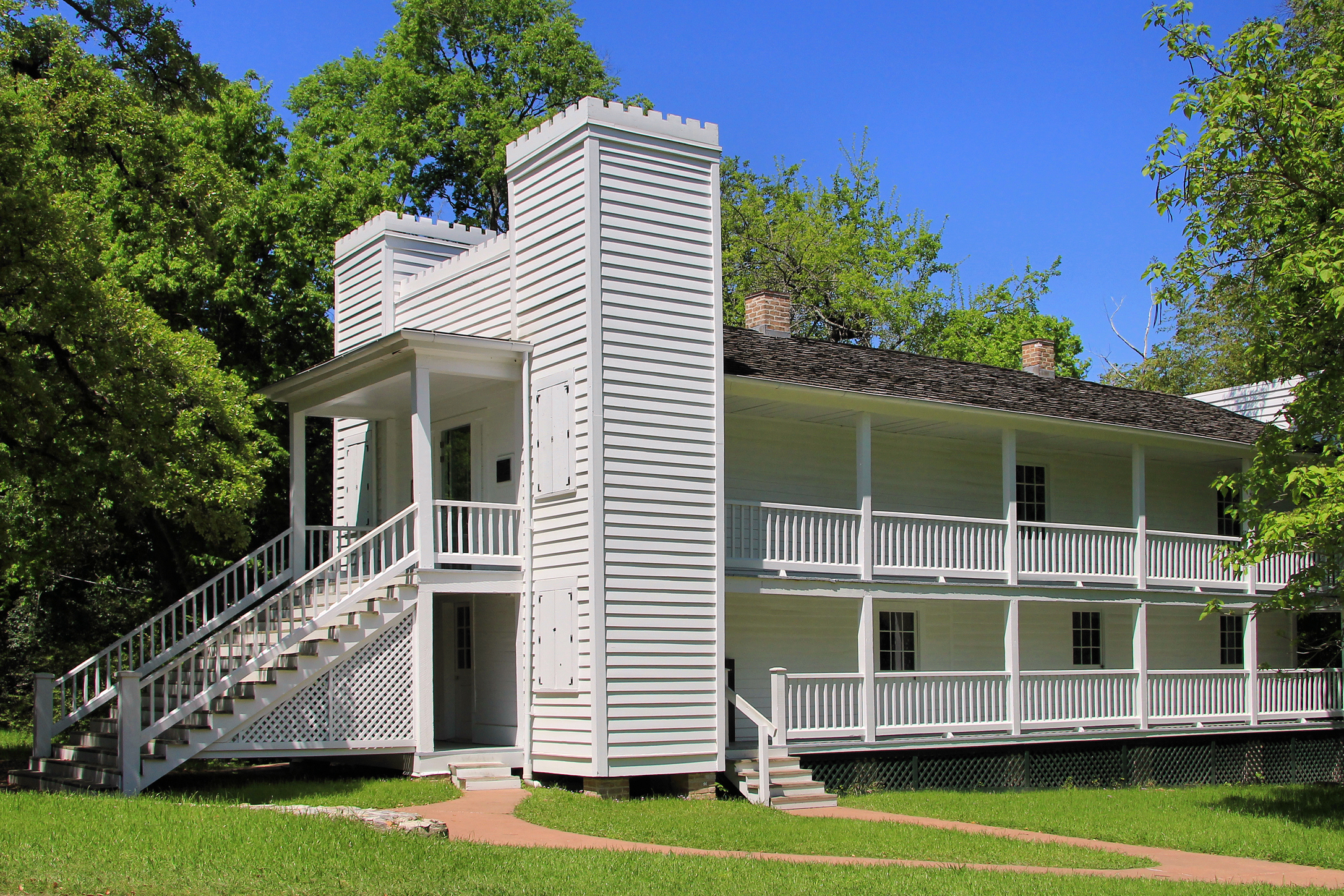
Steamboat House, where Sam Houston died

Lacking the financial means to buy back their Woodland home, they rented the Steamboat House in Huntsville. The 69-year-old Houston was in his final days and physically feeble, requiring the use of a cane to get around. Until daughter Maggie took over as his personal assistant, his wife shouldered the duties. Even so, during this period, he managed to get the Confederate War Department to discharge all draftees from the Alabama-Coushatta tribe, which had distanced itself completely from the conflict.

On July 26, 1863, with Margaret at his bedside reading the 23rd Psalm to him, Houston died. His will named her as his executrix, and named his cousin Thomas Caruthers, as well as family friends Thomas Gibbs, J. Carroll Smith and Anthony Martin Branch, as executors. He had died land rich, but cash poor. The inventory compiled of his estate after his death listed several thousand acres in real estate, $250 cash, slaves (one of whom was Joshua Houston), a handful of livestock and his personal possessions. (Note: Margaret and the other executors of his estate specifically named each of the 12 slaves on the inventory, with a total valuation of $10,530. Haley (2004), p. 417. An enduring myth associated with Houston is that in 1862 he read his slaves the Emancipation Proclamation from a newspaper, and set them free. The proclamation took effect January 1, 1863. Slaves in Texas were not emancipated until June 19, 1865 by the issuance in Galveston of General Order No. 3 from Union General Gordon Granger, almost two years after Houston's death. The Texas constitution in effect under the Confederacy, Section III, Article 2, prohibited manumission (a slave owner freeing his slaves). Roberts (1993), p. 319; Campbell, Randolph B. (July 1984). "The End of Slavery in Texas: A Research Note". The Southwestern Historical Quarterly. 88. The Portal to Texas History: 71–80.; "Juneteenth". Texas State Library and Archives Commission.;"Article VIII, Section 2". Texas Constitution amended 1861. Tarlton Law Library. Archived from the original on September 27, 2020.; Porterfield, Bill (July 1973). "Sam Houston, Warts and All". Texas Monthly. 1 (6): 67.; Cox, Mike. "Sam's Will". Texas Escapes. Blueprints For Travel, LLC.)

Margaret was now a widow with seven of her eight children under the age of 18 and financially dependent on her. She returned to live near her mother in Independence, Texas, swapping land for a nearby property that became known as the Mrs. Sam Houston House. The Texas legislature eventually gave Margaret an amount equivalent to her husband's unpaid gubernatorial salary; nevertheless, in order to afford Sam Jr.'s enrollment at medical school at the University of Pennsylvania, she rented out the Ben Lomond plantation.

Nancy Lea died of an undiagnosed set of flu-like ailments on February 7, 1864, and was entombed on the grounds of her home. Margaret died on December 3, 1867, having contracted yellow fever during an epidemic. Walter Reed would not make his discovery of the cause of yellow fever through mosquito bite until 1900; contamination through contact was the pervading fear in 1867, and prevented Margaret's remains from being interred in a public cemetery with her husband's. She was buried in the ground beside Nancy's tomb at 11 p.m. by her servant Bingley, family friend Major Eber Cave, and her two daughters Nettie and Mary Willie. No funeral service was performed.

== Legacy ==
Two years after Sam Houston's death, Baylor University president William Carey Crane was commissioned by Margaret to write her husband's biography, allowing complete access to all correspondence and records. Crane was a Lea family friend from Alabama who had little more than a passing acquaintance with "the hero of San Jacinto". His perception of Margaret, however, was that of an extraordinary woman, in many aspects equal to the man she married. He stated that Houston's "guardian angel", as he called her, had set out from the time she met Houston to refine his rough edges and provide a solid foundation for his personal life. That assessment of Margaret's relationship with her husband was echoed over a century later by author James L. Haley, "... Houston trusted the care of his soul to Margaret, that he had no more war to fight within himself, left him with more energy to wage political battle." Ultimately, several of Houston's associates were cooperative with the Crane endeavor, but not everyone was inspired to join the effort. According to daughter Maggie, the author had told her that many valuable documents were destroyed by Margaret in a fit of anger when someone she considered a friend expressed disinterest. Life and Select Literary Remains of Sam Houston of Texas was rejected by the initial publisher, but was eventually published by J. B. Lippincott in 1884.

Women of character, culture and staunch
devotion to their families and church.
Each in her own way greatly influenced
the career of Sam Houston and
the course of Texas History

— Memorial slab at burial site of
Margaret Lea Houston and Nancy Moffette Lea

After emancipation and Margaret's death, "Aunt Eliza", as the children called her, alternated her time between Nannie's and Maggie's households. When Eliza died in 1898, at her request, she was buried next to Margaret. Nancy's tomb fell to decay over the years, after which she was re-interred in the ground with Margaret and Eliza. There was much discussion during the Texas 1936 centennial about moving Margaret's remains next to her husband's in Huntsville, but the family and various authorities never came to an agreement over it. Not until May 15, 1965, was an historical marker erected in Independence to denote her contributions to Texas history.

=== Children ===
"First Lady and the matriarch of one of the most significant families in Texas history." – Texas Historical Commission

- Sam Houston Jr. (1843–1894) became a physician and author. He was widowed early into his marriage to Lucy Anderson and spent his final years living with his sister Maggie.

Sam Jr.'s daughter Margaret Bell Houston (1877–1966) was a writer and suffragist who became the first president of the Dallas Equal Suffrage Association.

- Nancy (Nannie) Elizabeth Houston (1846–1920) married businessman Joseph Clay Stiles Morrow. When her mother died, Nannie assumed guardianship of her younger siblings.

Nannie's great granddaughter Jean Houston Baldwin (1916–2002) was the wife of Texas Governor Price Daniel.
Nannie's great-great-grandson Price Daniel Jr. (1941–1981) was Speaker of the Texas House of Representatives.

- Margaret (Maggie) Lea Houston (1848–1906) married Weston Lafayette Williams. The couple purchased Margaret's house where they helped Nannie provide a home for their younger siblings, and also raised their own five children there.
- Mary William (Mary Willie) Houston (1850–1931) married attorney John Simeon Morrow. Widowed young with five children to support, she became postmistress of Abilene, Texas, and held the position for 22 years.
- Antoinette (Nettie) Power Houston (1852–1932) was poet laureate and state historian for the Daughters of the Republic of Texas. She married the then Texas A&M University president William Lorraine Bringhurst. Her funeral was held at the Alamo Mission in San Antonio where her body had lain in state for public viewing.
- Andrew Jackson Houston (1854–1941) was a United States Senator. A graduate of West Point, he served in Teddy Roosevelt's Rough Riders during the Spanish–American War. He was a proponent of prohibition and supportive of suffrage for women. His first wife was Carrie Glenn Purnell; after her death, he remarried to Elizabeth Hart Good.
- William (Willie) Rogers Houston (1858–1920) was a lifelong bachelor, and became a career Special Agent of the Bureau of Indian Affairs. He died from what is believed to have been either a heart attack and/or a fall from his horse while on official duty, on the grounds of Goodland Indian School in Choctaw County, Oklahoma.
- Temple Lea Houston (1860–1905) served as Texas State Senator, District 19, and Senate President Pro Tem. He was a multi-linguist in ten languages that included seven spoken by Native Americans. Temple Lea became the most famous of the Houston children and was considered a brilliant legal counsel whose "Soiled Dove Plea" won the acquittal of a woman accused of prostitution. Married to Laura Cross, he lived his final years in Oklahoma where locals gave him the nickname "Lone Wolf of the Canadian (river)". The Temple Houston television series was based on his legal career.

Houston family tree
- John Houston m. Margaret McClung (c.1650–1735) Ireland
  - John Houston (1690–1755) m. Margaret Mary Cunningham (1694–1754), both born in Ireland and died in Virginia
    - James Houston, died in Ireland
    - Robert H. Houston (1720–1760), born in Ireland, died in Virginia m.Margaret Dunlap Davidson (b. 1720)
      - John Houston m. Anna Logan
      - Samuel Davidson Houston (1745–1807) m. Elizabeth Blair Paxton (1757–1831)
        - Paxton Houston
        - Robert Houston
        - James Houston (1782–1824) m. Rebecca G. Herndon
        - John P. Houston (1790–1838)
        - Sam Houston (1793–1863)
          - m. Eliza Allen (m. 1829 div. 1837)
          - m. Tiana "Diana" (Rogers) Gentry (m. 1830) (died 1838)
          - m. Margaret Moffette Lea (1819–1867) (Note: Married Samuel Houston.) m. (May 9, 1840 - his death)
            - Sam Houston Jr., MD (1843–1894) (Note: Child of Samuel and Margaret Houston.) m. Lucy Anderson (1845–1886) (Note: Married.)
              - Margaret Bell Houston (1876–1966) (Note: Child of Sam and Lucy. (Note: SR staff (November 26, 2013), "Samuel Houston Family Tree", Star of the Republic Museum, Blinn College Second Generation))
              - Nellie Houston (1879–1882)
              - Harry Howard Houston (1883–1935)
            - Nancy "Nannie" Elizabeth (1846–1920) m. Joseph Clay Stiles Morrow (1839–1925)
              - Margaret Houston Morrow (1867–1948) m. Robert Alexander John (1864–1933) (Note: Child of Nancy and Joseph.)
                - Jean Houston John (b.1891) m. Franklin T. Baldwin (b.1889)
                  - Jean Houston Baldwin (1916–2002) m. Governor Price Daniel (1910–1988)
                    - Price Daniel Jr. (1941–1981) Speaker of the Texas House of Representatives 1973–1975
              - Emily Preston Morrow (1869–1892)
              - Jennie Belle Morrow (1871–1977)
              - Preston Morrow (1875–1909)
              - Temple Houston Morrow (1878–1966)
              - Elizabeth Paxton Morrow (1886–1906)
            - Margaret Lea Houston (1848–1906) m. Captain Weston Lafayette Williams (1835–1899)
              - Houston Williams (1869–1931) (Note: Child of Margaret and Weston.)
              - Margaret Madge Williams (1872–1955)
              - Franklin Weston Williams (1874–1958)
              - James Royston Williams (1877–1953)
              - Marian Lee Williams (b. 1880)
            - Mary William Houston (1850–1931) m. John Simeon Morrow (1840–1886)
              - John Houston Morrow (1871–1916) (Note: Child of Mary and John.)
              - Andrew Morrow (1875–1881)
              - Jesse Morrow (b.1876)
              - Jessie Lea Morrow (1885–1975)
              - Maude Louise Morrow (1883–1957)
            - Antoinette Power Houston (1852–1932) m. Dr. William S. Lorraine Bringhurst (1844–1913)
              - Sam Houston Bringhurst (b.1874) (Note: Child of Antoinette and William.)
              - Charles Raguet Bringhurst (1880–1882)
              - William Stuart Bringhurst (b.1885)
              - Nettie Houston Bringhurst (1887–1935)
              - Anna Katherine Bringhurst (1890–1895))
            - Andrew Jackson Houston (1854–1941) United States Senator
              - m. Carrie Glenn Purnell (1858–1884)
                - Ariadne T. Houston (1879–1969) (Note: Child of Andrew and Carrie.)
                - Margaret Houston (1882–1943)
                - Carrie Marie Houston (1883–1893)
              - m. Elizabeth Hart Good (1864–1907)
                - Josephine Anna Houston (1889–1914) (Note: Child of Andrew and Elizabeth.)
            - William Rogers Houston (1858–1920)
            - Temple Lea Houston (1860–1905), Texas state senator 1885–1888 m. Laura Cross (1863–1938)
              - Temple Lea Houston Jr. (1884–1920) (Note: Child of Temple and Laura.)
              - Louise Houston (1885–1887)
              - Samuel Houston III (1892–1952)
              - Richard Caldon Houston (1895–1974)
                - Richard Temple Houston (1931-2021)
                  - Daniel L. Houston
                  - Sheridan E. Hollender
                  - Mark P. Houston
              - Mary Houston (1898–1977)
        - William Houston m. Mary Ball
        - Isabella Houston
        - Mary Houston
          - m. Col. Matthew Wallace
          - m. Gen. William Wallace
        - Eliza Houston m. Samuel Moore
      - Bettie Houston m. James McClung
      - Margaret Houston
      - Esther Houston
      - Mary Houston
    - Isabelia Houston
    - Esther Houston
    - John Houston
    - Samuel Nelson Houston m. Susan (Strickler)
      - Henry H. Houston
    - Mathew Houston
Notes

Bibliography

- Ellis, Franklin; Evans, Samuel (1883). History of Lancaster County, Pennsylvania: With Biographical Sketches of Many of Its Pioneers and Prominent Men. Everts & Peck. pp. 591–592.

=== Historic residences and sites ===
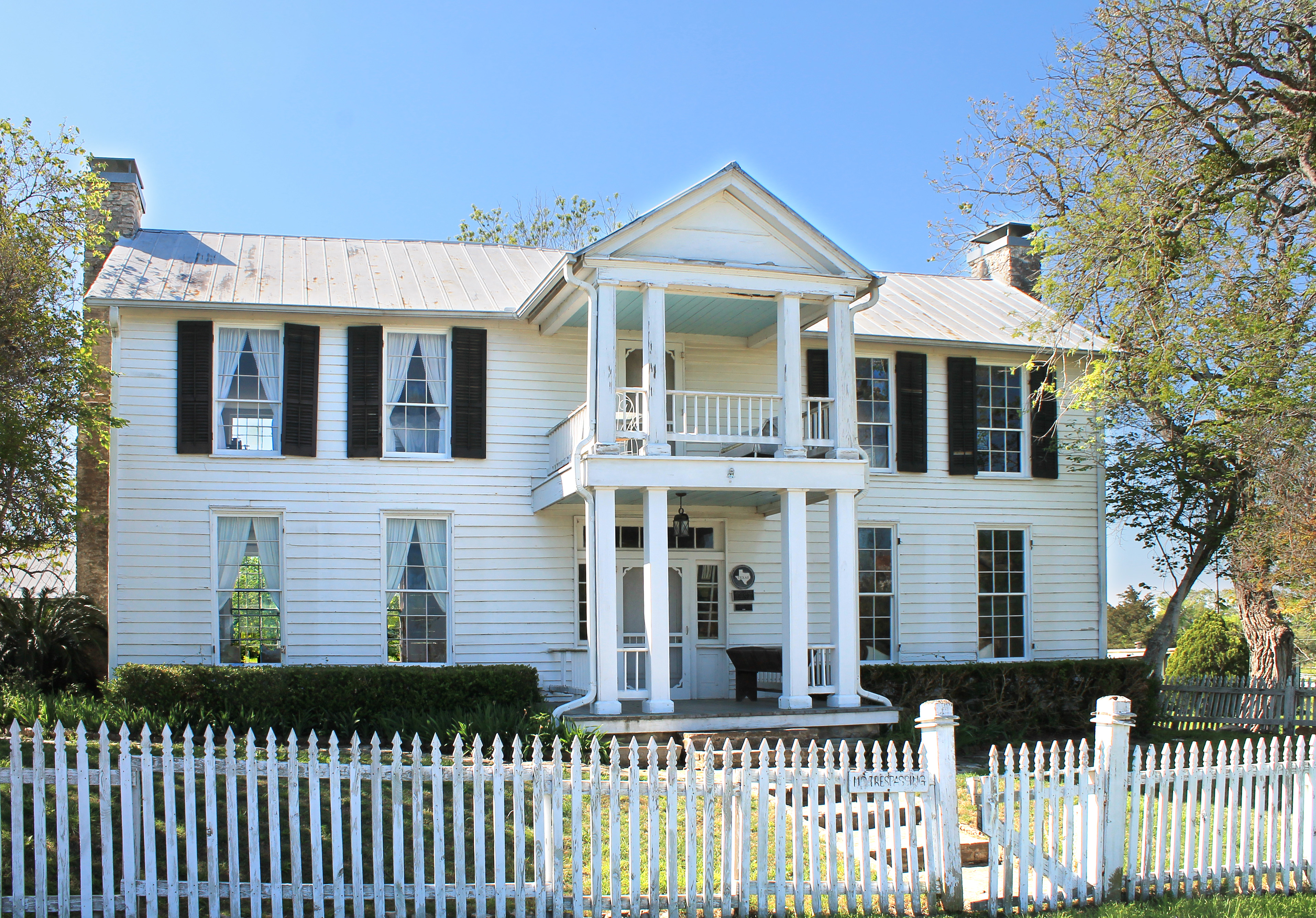
Mrs. Sam Houston House

- Sam Houston's house in Houston City has been replaced by an office building.
- Ben Lomond and Raven Hill homes deteriorated through the years and were destroyed, as was Nancy Lea's home in Independence.
- Steamboat House was moved in 1936 to the grounds of the Sam Houston Memorial Museum at Sam Houston State University, and designated a Recorded Texas Historic Landmark in 1964.
- The Mrs. Sam Houston House in Independence was listed on the National Register of Historic Places listings in Washington County on October 22, 1970.
- The Woodland home was listed on the National Register of Historic Places listings in Walker County on May 30, 1974, as the Sam Houston House, and is part of the Sam Houston Memorial Museum.
- The site of Cedar Point home located at the mouth of Cedar Bayou, in Baytown, Texas, on Trinity Bay now lies in the bayou, as meandering erosion has consumed it. This home is where the Houstons' lived when Sam Jr. enlisted in The Bayland Guards, CSA.
- The Rocky Creek Baptist Church bell purchased by Nancy Lea is currently located at the intersection of Farm to Market Road 50 and Farm to Market Road 390.
- Sam Houston's baptismal site is marked by the Texas Historical Commission on Farm to Market Road 150 at Sam Houston Road.

=== Depiction in popular media ===
The actress Nancy Rennick (1932–2006), who had a leading role in the syndicated adventure television series Rescue 8, played Mrs. Houston in the 1958 episode "The Girl Who Walked with a Giant" of the syndicated anthology series, Death Valley Days, hosted by Stanley Andrews. The story focuses on Margaret's role as a confidant of her husband from his days as president of the Republic of Texas to his time as governor, a post that he resigned in 1861 because he could not in good conscience support the Confederate States of America, of which Texas was a partner.

== Citations ==
=== References ===
- Baum, Dalee (1998). The Shattering of Texas Unionism: Politics in the Lone Star State during the Civil War Era. Baton Rouge, LA: Louisiana State University Press. ISBN 978-0-8071-2245-7.
- Crane, William Carey (1884). Life and Select Literary Remains of Sam Houston of Texas. Philadelphia, PA: J. B. Lippincott & Co.
- Erickson, Hal (2009). Encyclopedia of Television Law Shows. Jefferson, NC: McFarland & Company. ISBN 978-0-7864-3828-0.
- Flanagan, Sue (1973). Sam Houston's Texas. Austin, TX: University of Texas Press. ISBN 0-292-73363-1.
- Haley, James L. (2004). Sam Houston. Norman, OK: University of Oklahoma Press. ISBN 978-0-8061-3644-8.
- Haley, James L. (2006). Passionate Nation: The Epic History of Texas. New York, NY: Free Press. ISBN 978-0-684-86291-0.
- Houston, Sam; Roberts, Madge Thornall (1996a). The Personal Correspondence of Sam Houston – Vol. 1: 1839–1845. Denton, TX: University of North Texas Press. ISBN 1-57441-000-8.
- Houston, Sam; Roberts, Madge Thornall (1996b). The Personal Correspondence of Sam Houston – Vol. 2: 1846–1848. Denton, TX: University of North Texas Press. ISBN 1-57441-063-6.
- Houston, Sam; Roberts, Madge Thornall (1996c). The Personal Correspondence of Sam Houston – Vol. 3: 1848–1852. Denton, TX: University of North Texas Press. ISBN 1-57441-031-8.
- Houston, Sam; Roberts, Madge Thornall (1996d). The Personal Correspondence of Sam Houston – Vol. 4: 1852–1863. Denton, TX: University of North Texas Press. ISBN 1-57441-084-9.
- Jackson, Jack (2005). Indian Agent: Peter Ellis Bean in Mexican Texas. Denton, TX: Texas A&M University Press. ISBN 1-58544-444-8.
- Newton-Matza, Mitchell (2014). Disasters and Tragic Events: An Encyclopedia of Catastrophes in American History. Vol. 1. Santa Barbara, CA: ABC-CLIO. ISBN 978-1-61069-165-9.
- Roberts, Madge Thornall (1993). Star of Destiny: The Private Life of Sam and Margaret Houston. Denton, TX: University of North Texas Press. ISBN 0-929398-51-3.
- Seale, William (1992) [1970]. Sam Houston's Wife: A Biography of Margaret Lea Houston. University of Oklahoma Press. ISBN 978-0-8061-2436-0.

Honorary titles
Preceded by Vacant	First Lady Republic of Texas; 1841–1844	Succeeded by Mary Smith Jones
Preceded by Vacant	First Lady of Texas; 1859–1861	Succeeded by Martha Melissa Evans Clark
