= Price Daniel Jr. =

American politician (1941–1981)

Speaker of the Texas House of Representatives
- In office January 14, 1973 – January 14, 1975
- Preceded by: Rayford Price
- Succeeded by: Bill W. Clayton

Member of the Texas House of Representatives from the 16th district
- In office January 9, 1973 – January 14, 1975
- Preceded by: Rayford Price
- Succeeded by: Perry A. Tanner Jr.

Member of the Texas House of Representatives from the 6th district
- In office January 14, 1969 – January 9, 1973
- Preceded by: David W. Crews
- Succeeded by: Arthur 'Buddy' Temple

Personal details
- Born: Marion Price Daniel Jr. June 8, 1941 Austin, Texas, U.S.
- Died: January 19, 1981 (aged 39) Liberty County, Texas, U.S.
- Cause of death: Mariticide via gunshot wounds
- Party: Democratic
- Spouses: Diane Ford Wommack (m. 1966; div. 1975) Vickie Loretha Carroll Moore (m. 1976)
- Children: 3
- Parents: Marion Price Daniel Sr. (father); Jean Houston Baldwin (mother)
- Relatives: William Partlow Daniel (uncle); Sam Houston (great-great-great grandfather); Margaret Lea Houston (great-great-great grandmother)
- Education: Baylor University
- Profession: Attorney

Marion Price Daniel Jr. (June 8, 1941 – January 19, 1981) was an American politician who served as the speaker of the Texas House of Representatives from 1973 to 1975. He was a member of the Texas House of Representatives from 1969 to 1975. He is also known for his death during his marriage to his second wife in 1981, after he had written her out of his will and her third time filing for divorce.

== Early life ==
Daniel was born in Austin, Texas, on June 8, 1941, into a political dynasty that dated back to his great-great-great grandparents Sam Houston and Margaret Lea Houston. At the time of his birth, his father Marion Price Daniel Sr. was a member of the Texas House of Representatives who eventually rose to the office of Speaker. Daniel Sr. also served as Governor of Texas, as a United States senator and associate justice of the Texas Supreme Court. His mother Jean Houston Baldwin, a member of both the Daughters of the Republic of Texas and the Daughters of the American Revolution, was a direct descendant of Sam and Margaret Lea Houston. Daniel Sr.'s brother William Partlow Daniel also served in the Texas House of Representatives and was appointed Governor of the U.S. Territory of Guam by President John F. Kennedy.

He was raised in Austin and followed the political career of his father. By age twelve, he was making speeches on his father's behalf. He graduated from Austin High School in 1959, Baylor University in 1964, and Baylor Law School in 1966. While still enrolled in the university, Daniel started a mail-order book business that specialized in rare books of Texas history.

== Political career ==
After receiving his law degree, Daniel moved to Liberty, Texas, and began his legal practice there, where he was also elected Justice of the Peace for Liberty County. In 1968, at age 27, he was elected to the Texas House of Representatives from the same seat his father had held from 1939 to 1945.

After the fallout from the Sharpstown scandal, with those connected being voted out of office, there was a 50% turnover in both houses of the Texas Legislature. On January 9, 1973, Price Jr. was unanimously elected Speaker of the House by his fellow Democratic Party state representatives, who had a 133 to 17 majority over the Republican Party in the House.

Under Daniel's leadership, the reform-minded Sixty-third Texas Legislature passed new ethics, financial disclosure, and open-records laws. The Legislature also updated and strengthened open-meetings, and lobbying laws. He believed that it should be illegal for the speaker to offer favors or make threats in order to get votes. Because of the great power of the office, Daniel believed that no speaker should be elected for more than one term, and consequently he did not seek reelection in 1974. There had been talk of Price Jr. running for Governor in 1974, but he was apparently not interested.

Price Jr. served as president of the 1974 Texas Constitutional Convention, the first since the Constitution was established in 1876. He relented on a right-to-work compromise to appease the conservatives, and in doing so, lost his base of the liberal labor force. The 1974 convention to revise the state constitution was not a success. Further alienating his support base, Price Jr held a press conference blaming organized labor, and specifically what he saw as its manipulation of racial minority delegates, for the convention's failure.

In 1978, Daniel unsuccessfully sought the Democratic nomination for Texas Attorney General, losing to eventual general election winner Mark White.

== Personal life and death ==
Daniel was married twice. He married politically connected Diane Ford Wommack on April 4, 1966. Diane was a descendant of Texas Governor (1907–1911) Thomas Mitchell Campbell. They had one son, Thomas Houston Campbell Daniel. Their divorce was final November 26, 1975.

His second wife was Dairy Queen waitress Vickie Loretha Carroll Moore. Vickie and husband Larry Dale Moore were divorced on August 16, 1976. Price and Vickie were married November 1, 1976. They had two sons, Franklin Baldwin Daniel and Marion Price Daniel IV.

One month after Price declared his candidacy for Texas Attorney General, Vickie filed for divorce on October 22, 1977, but apparently withdrew the petition. In May 1980, Price re-wrote his will, cutting Vickie out. On December 31 of that year, Vickie once again filed for divorce, even though she and Price continued to share a house with separate quarters. Price was served with divorce papers on January 15, 1981. On January 19, Price returned home where he was shot and killed.

After a 10-hour session involving 22 people, the Liberty County grand jury returned an indictment of murder against Mrs. Daniel. At the time of her indictment, she had not yet been questioned by authorities about the events leading up to her husband's death, nor had she testified before the grand jury. Vickie was represented by flamboyant legal legend Richard "Racehorse" Haynes and was acquitted on October 30, 1981. The shooting and Vickie Daniel's murder trial were the subject of a 1987 book, Deadly Blessings and a 1992 made-for-television film, Bed of Lies.

=== Houston family tree ===
Marion Price Daniel Jr. was a direct descendant of Sam Houston and his wife Margaret Lea Houston through his mother Jean Houston Baldwin Daniel, as noted by the family tree below.

Houston family tree
- John Houston m. Margaret McClung (c.1650–1735) Ireland
  - John Houston (1690–1755) m. Margaret Mary Cunningham (1694–1754), both born in Ireland and died in Virginia
    - James Houston, died in Ireland
    - Robert H. Houston (1720–1760), born in Ireland, died in Virginia m.Margaret Dunlap Davidson (b. 1720)
      - John Houston m. Anna Logan
      - Samuel Davidson Houston (1745–1807) m. Elizabeth Blair Paxton (1757–1831)
        - Paxton Houston
        - Robert Houston
        - James Houston (1782–1824) m. Rebecca G. Herndon
        - John P. Houston (1790–1838)
        - Sam Houston (1793–1863)
          - m. Eliza Allen (m. 1829 div. 1837)
          - m. Tiana "Diana" (Rogers) Gentry (m. 1830) (died 1838)
          - m. Margaret Moffette Lea (1819–1867) (Note: Married Samuel Houston.) m. (May 9, 1840 - his death)
            - Sam Houston Jr., MD (1843–1894) (Note: Child of Samuel and Margaret Houston.) m. Lucy Anderson (1845–1886) (Note: Married.)
              - Margaret Bell Houston (1876–1966) (Note: Child of Sam and Lucy. (Note: SR staff (November 26, 2013), "Samuel Houston Family Tree", Star of the Republic Museum, Blinn College Second Generation))
              - Nellie Houston (1879–1882)
              - Harry Howard Houston (1883–1935)
            - Nancy "Nannie" Elizabeth (1846–1920) m. Joseph Clay Stiles Morrow (1839–1925)
              - Margaret Houston Morrow (1867–1948) m. Robert Alexander John (1864–1933) (Note: Child of Nancy and Joseph.)
                - Jean Houston John (b.1891) m. Franklin T. Baldwin (b.1889)
                  - Jean Houston Baldwin (1916–2002) m. Governor Price Daniel (1910–1988)
                    - Price Daniel Jr. (1941–1981) Speaker of the Texas House of Representatives 1973–1975
              - Emily Preston Morrow (1869–1892)
              - Jennie Belle Morrow (1871–1977)
              - Preston Morrow (1875–1909)
              - Temple Houston Morrow (1878–1966)
              - Elizabeth Paxton Morrow (1886–1906)
            - Margaret Lea Houston (1848–1906) m. Captain Weston Lafayette Williams (1835–1899)
              - Houston Williams (1869–1931) (Note: Child of Margaret and Weston.)
              - Margaret Madge Williams (1872–1955)
              - Franklin Weston Williams (1874–1958)
              - James Royston Williams (1877–1953)
              - Marian Lee Williams (b. 1880)
            - Mary William Houston (1850–1931) m. John Simeon Morrow (1840–1886)
              - John Houston Morrow (1871–1916) (Note: Child of Mary and John.)
              - Andrew Morrow (1875–1881)
              - Jesse Morrow (b.1876)
              - Jessie Lea Morrow (1885–1975)
              - Maude Louise Morrow (1883–1957)
            - Antoinette Power Houston (1852–1932) m. Dr. William S. Lorraine Bringhurst (1844–1913)
              - Sam Houston Bringhurst (b.1874) (Note: Child of Antoinette and William.)
              - Charles Raguet Bringhurst (1880–1882)
              - William Stuart Bringhurst (b.1885)
              - Nettie Houston Bringhurst (1887–1935)
              - Anna Katherine Bringhurst (1890–1895))
            - Andrew Jackson Houston (1854–1941) United States Senator
              - m. Carrie Glenn Purnell (1858–1884)
                - Ariadne T. Houston (1879–1969) (Note: Child of Andrew and Carrie.)
                - Margaret Houston (1882–1943)
                - Carrie Marie Houston (1883–1893)
              - m. Elizabeth Hart Good (1864–1907)
                - Josephine Anna Houston (1889–1914) (Note: Child of Andrew and Elizabeth.)
            - William Rogers Houston (1858–1920)
            - Temple Lea Houston (1860–1905), Texas state senator 1885–1888 m. Laura Cross (1863–1938)
              - Temple Lea Houston Jr. (1884–1920) (Note: Child of Temple and Laura.)
              - Louise Houston (1885–1887)
              - Samuel Houston III (1892–1952)
              - Richard Caldon Houston (1895–1974)
                - Richard Temple Houston (1931-2021)
                  - Daniel L. Houston
                  - Sheridan E. Hollender
                  - Mark P. Houston
              - Mary Houston (1898–1977)
        - William Houston m. Mary Ball
        - Isabella Houston
        - Mary Houston
          - m. Col. Matthew Wallace
          - m. Gen. William Wallace
        - Eliza Houston m. Samuel Moore
      - Bettie Houston m. James McClung
      - Margaret Houston
      - Esther Houston
      - Mary Houston
    - Isabelia Houston
    - Esther Houston
    - John Houston
    - Samuel Nelson Houston m. Susan (Strickler)
      - Henry H. Houston
    - Mathew Houston
Notes

Bibliography

- Ellis, Franklin; Evans, Samuel (1883). History of Lancaster County, Pennsylvania: With Biographical Sketches of Many of Its Pioneers and Prominent Men. Everts & Peck. pp. 591–592.

== Bibliography ==
- Seale, William (1992) [1970]. Sam Houston's Wife: A Biography of Margaret Lea Houston. University of Oklahoma Press. ISBN 978-0-8061-2436-0.

Texas House of Representatives
Preceded by David Crews	Member of the Texas House of Representatives from District 6 (Liberty); 1969–1973	Succeeded by Arthur "Buddy" Temple
Preceded by Rayford Price	Member of the Texas House of Representatives from District 16 (Liberty); 1973–1975	Succeeded by Perry A. Tanner Jr.
Political offices
Preceded by Rayford Price	Speaker of the Texas House of Representatives; 1973–1975	Succeeded by Bill W. Clayton
