= Andrew Jackson Houston =

American politician (1854–1941)

United States Senator from Texas
- In office April 21, 1941 – June 26, 1941
- Appointed by: W. Lee O'Daniel
- Preceded by: Morris Sheppard
- Succeeded by: W. Lee O'Daniel

United States Marshal for the Eastern District of Texas
- In office June 2, 1902 – May 25, 1910
- Preceded by: John Grant
- Succeeded by: Dupont B. Lyon

Personal details
- Born: June 21, 1854 Independence, Texas, U.S.
- Died: June 26, 1941 (aged 87) Baltimore, Maryland, U.S.
- Resting place: Texas State Cemetery, Austin, Texas
- Party: Democratic; Republican; Prohibition
- Spouse(s): Carrie Glenn Purnell (d. 1884); Elizabeth Hart Goode (d. 1907)
- Children: 3
- Parents: Sam Houston; Margaret Lea Houston
- Profession: Lawyer; Author; Historian

Andrew Jackson Houston (June 21, 1854 – June 26, 1941) was an American politician who served briefly as a United States senator in 1941, appointed to temporarily fill the vacancy left by the death of longtime Senator Morris Sheppard. He was a son of statesman Sam Houston and his wife Margaret Lea Houston, and was named for his father's mentor Andrew Jackson.

== Early life ==
Houston c. 1875

Andrew Jackson Houston was born in Independence, Texas, on June 21, 1854. He was educated at several military academies and colleges, including Baylor University and West Point—a member of the Class of 1875, he dropped out before graduating. He studied law and was admitted to the bar in 1876.

== Career ==
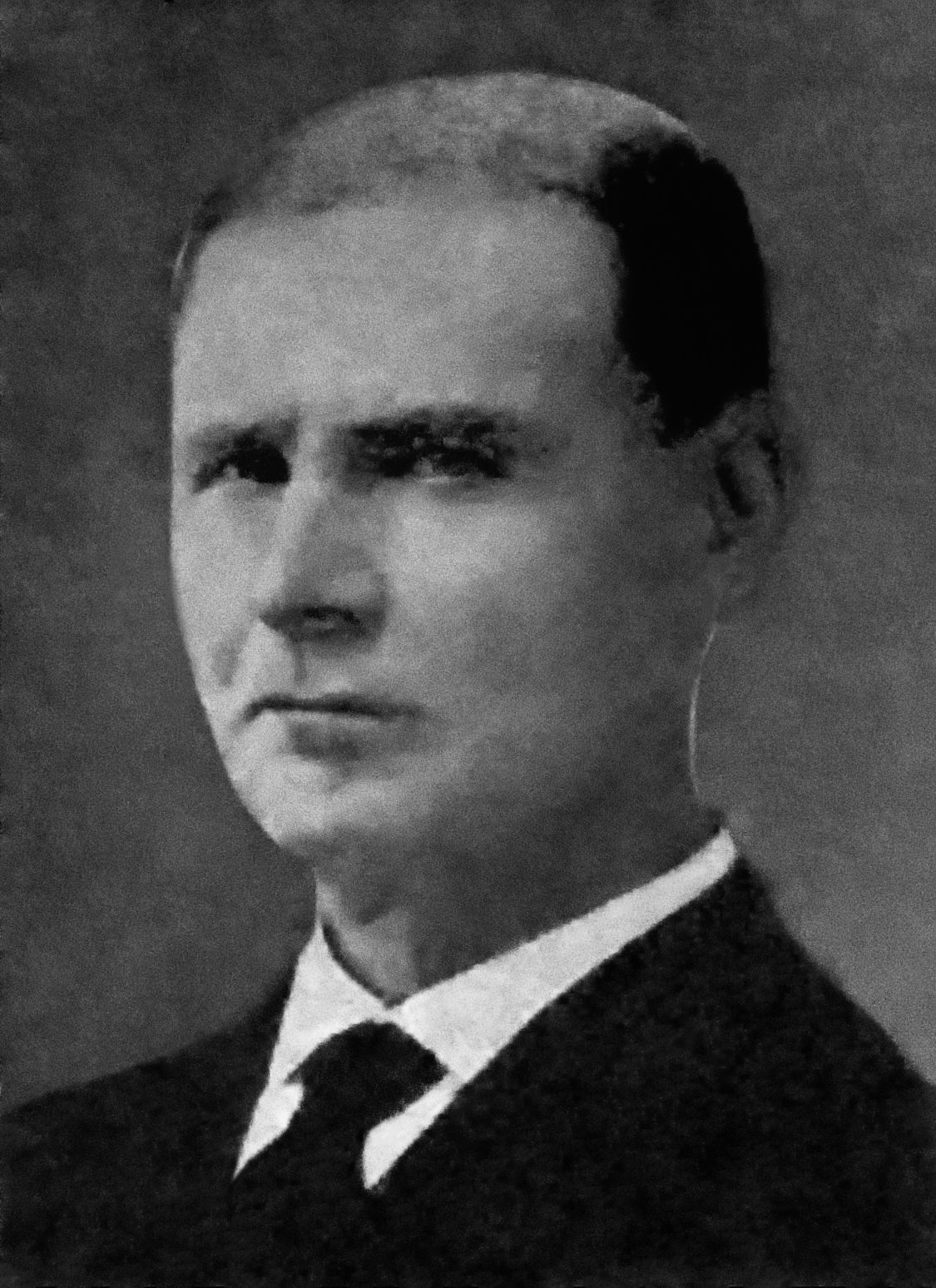
Houston c. 1910

Houston had a varied career, including serving as clerk of the federal court in Dallas, a colonel in the Texas National Guard and United States Marshal for the eastern district of Texas.

Houston ran unsuccessfully for Governor of Texas in 1892 as a lily-white Republican candidate.

During the Spanish–American War Houston raised and organized a cavalry troop which was mustered into service as part of the Rough Riders. In 1910 and 1912 he was a Prohibition Party candidate for Governor.

A longtime resident of La Porte, in 1918 he retired to study and write history. From 1924 until his Senate appointment he held a sinecure as Superintendent of the state park at the San Jacinto battleground, where his father had won the battle which led to the independence of Texas from Mexico.

== United States senator ==
Houston's semi-retirement ended in 1941, when Morris Sheppard died while representing Texas in the United States Senate.

Texas Governor W. Lee O'Daniel desired to serve in the Senate, but knew it would be politically unpopular to name himself as the interim appointee pending a special election for the remainder of Sheppard's term. Certain that the 86-year-old Houston would not run in the special election, O'Daniel appointed him to temporarily fill the vacancy. At the time of his swearing in, 82 years after his father had served in the same seat, Houston was the oldest man to enter the Senate. (The oldest person overall was Rebecca Latimer Felton).

Houston joined the Senate as a Democrat, and filled the seat from April 21, 1941, until his death. The early June trip from Texas to Washington, D.C., to begin his duties had a negative effect on Houston's health, and he attended only one committee meeting as a senator, afterwards spending most of his time hospitalized.

== Death and burial ==
Houston died in a Baltimore, Maryland, hospital on June 26, 1941, five days after his 87th birthday. Briefly interred at Abbey Mausoleum in Arlington County, Virginia, he was later disinterred and reburied in the Texas State Cemetery.

== Legacy ==
In the special election held a few days after Houston's death, O'Daniel defeated Lyndon B. Johnson and several other candidates, and won the seat.

Houston is one of 4 Senators (the others being William Johnson, Edmund Pettus and Strom Thurmond) to be the oldest living U.S. senator while serving and he is the only Senator subsequent to the second U.S. Congress to become the oldest living Senator upon entering office.

== Family ==
Houston was married twice; his first wife was Carrie Glenn Purnell of Austin, who died in 1884. His second wife, Elizabeth Hart Goode of Dallas died in 1907. Houston was the father of three daughters, Ariadne, Marguerite, and Josephine; Ariadne and Marguerite largely devoted their adult lives to caring for their father. Both Ariadne and Marguerite traveled with him to Washington after his Senate appointment, and they were with him when he died.

== Houston family tree ==
Houston family tree
- John Houston m. Margaret McClung (c.1650–1735) Ireland
  - John Houston (1690–1755) m. Margaret Mary Cunningham (1694–1754), both born in Ireland and died in Virginia
    - James Houston, died in Ireland
    - Robert H. Houston (1720–1760), born in Ireland, died in Virginia m.Margaret Dunlap Davidson (b. 1720)
      - John Houston m. Anna Logan
      - Samuel Davidson Houston (1745–1807) m. Elizabeth Blair Paxton (1757–1831)
        - Paxton Houston
        - Robert Houston
        - James Houston (1782–1824) m. Rebecca G. Herndon
        - John P. Houston (1790–1838)
        - Sam Houston (1793–1863)
          - m. Eliza Allen (m. 1829 div. 1837)
          - m. Tiana "Diana" (Rogers) Gentry (m. 1830) (died 1838)
          - m. Margaret Moffette Lea (1819–1867) (Note: Married Samuel Houston.) m. (May 9, 1840 - his death)
            - Sam Houston Jr., MD (1843–1894) (Note: Child of Samuel and Margaret Houston.) m. Lucy Anderson (1845–1886) (Note: Married.)
              - Margaret Bell Houston (1876–1966) (Note: Child of Sam and Lucy. (Note: SR staff (November 26, 2013), "Samuel Houston Family Tree", Star of the Republic Museum, Blinn College Second Generation))
              - Nellie Houston (1879–1882)
              - Harry Howard Houston (1883–1935)
            - Nancy "Nannie" Elizabeth (1846–1920) m. Joseph Clay Stiles Morrow (1839–1925)
              - Margaret Houston Morrow (1867–1948) m. Robert Alexander John (1864–1933) (Note: Child of Nancy and Joseph.)
                - Jean Houston John (b.1891) m. Franklin T. Baldwin (b.1889)
                  - Jean Houston Baldwin (1916–2002) m. Governor Price Daniel (1910–1988)
                    - Price Daniel Jr. (1941–1981) Speaker of the Texas House of Representatives 1973–1975
              - Emily Preston Morrow (1869–1892)
              - Jennie Belle Morrow (1871–1977)
              - Preston Morrow (1875–1909)
              - Temple Houston Morrow (1878–1966)
              - Elizabeth Paxton Morrow (1886–1906)
            - Margaret Lea Houston (1848–1906) m. Captain Weston Lafayette Williams (1835–1899)
              - Houston Williams (1869–1931) (Note: Child of Margaret and Weston.)
              - Margaret Madge Williams (1872–1955)
              - Franklin Weston Williams (1874–1958)
              - James Royston Williams (1877–1953)
              - Marian Lee Williams (b. 1880)
            - Mary William Houston (1850–1931) m. John Simeon Morrow (1840–1886)
              - John Houston Morrow (1871–1916) (Note: Child of Mary and John.)
              - Andrew Morrow (1875–1881)
              - Jesse Morrow (b.1876)
              - Jessie Lea Morrow (1885–1975)
              - Maude Louise Morrow (1883–1957)
            - Antoinette Power Houston (1852–1932) m. Dr. William S. Lorraine Bringhurst (1844–1913)
              - Sam Houston Bringhurst (b.1874) (Note: Child of Antoinette and William.)
              - Charles Raguet Bringhurst (1880–1882)
              - William Stuart Bringhurst (b.1885)
              - Nettie Houston Bringhurst (1887–1935)
              - Anna Katherine Bringhurst (1890–1895))
            - Andrew Jackson Houston (1854–1941) United States Senator
              - m. Carrie Glenn Purnell (1858–1884)
                - Ariadne T. Houston (1879–1969) (Note: Child of Andrew and Carrie.)
                - Margaret Houston (1882–1943)
                - Carrie Marie Houston (1883–1893)
              - m. Elizabeth Hart Good (1864–1907)
                - Josephine Anna Houston (1889–1914) (Note: Child of Andrew and Elizabeth.)
            - William Rogers Houston (1858–1920)
            - Temple Lea Houston (1860–1905), Texas state senator 1885–1888 m. Laura Cross (1863–1938)
              - Temple Lea Houston Jr. (1884–1920) (Note: Child of Temple and Laura.)
              - Louise Houston (1885–1887)
              - Samuel Houston III (1892–1952)
              - Richard Caldon Houston (1895–1974)
                - Richard Temple Houston (1931-2021)
                  - Daniel L. Houston
                  - Sheridan E. Hollender
                  - Mark P. Houston
              - Mary Houston (1898–1977)
        - William Houston m. Mary Ball
        - Isabella Houston
        - Mary Houston
          - m. Col. Matthew Wallace
          - m. Gen. William Wallace
        - Eliza Houston m. Samuel Moore
      - Bettie Houston m. James McClung
      - Margaret Houston
      - Esther Houston
      - Mary Houston
    - Isabelia Houston
    - Esther Houston
    - John Houston
    - Samuel Nelson Houston m. Susan (Strickler)
      - Henry H. Houston
    - Mathew Houston
Notes

Bibliography

- Ellis, Franklin; Evans, Samuel (1883). History of Lancaster County, Pennsylvania: With Biographical Sketches of Many of Its Pioneers and Prominent Men. Everts & Peck. pp. 591–592.

== See also ==
- List of members of the United States Congress who died in office (1900–1949)

U.S. Senate
Preceded by John Morris Sheppard	U.S. senator (Class 2) from Texas; April 21, 1941 – June 26, 1941	Succeeded by W. Lee O'Daniel
Honorary titles
Preceded by Fountain Thompson	Oldest living U.S. senator April 21, 1941 – June 26, 1941	Succeeded by Fountain Thompson
