= John Houston (immigrant) =

Irish-American planter (1689/90–1754)

- Born: 1689 or 1690; Ulster, Kingdom of Ireland
- Died: 1754; Augusta County, Colony of Virginia (now Rockbridge County)
- Occupation: planter
- Spouse: Margaret Cunningham
- Parent(s): John Houston and Margaret McClung
- Relatives: Sam Houston (great-grandson)

John Houston (1689 or 1690 – 1754) was an Irish-born American planter. He immigrated from the Kingdom of Ireland to Colonial America in the 1730s. During the voyage the passengers learned that the ship's captain planned on robbing the wealthy passengers of their gold sovereigns. They took control of the vessel and sailed to Philadelphia. After living a number of years in Lancaster, Pennsylvania, Houston moved his family and established a plantation in what is now Rockbridge County, Virginia. His great-grandson was Sam Houston.

== Background ==
During the Wars of the Three Kingdoms, the Houstons and other Presbyterians emigrated from Scotland and settled in Ulster. The great migration from Scotland to the north of Ireland occurred between 1640 and 1670, during the later stages of the Plantation of Ulster. Houston descends from baronets (Sir Patrick Houstoun, 1st Baronet). Sir John Houston, a baron, built a castle near Johnstone in Renfrewshire, Scotland. He received an estate, given to an ancestor, Sir Hugh de Paduinan, after he saved the life of Malcolm, King of Scotland. The area was known initially as Hugh's-town for Sir Hugh and became what is now known as Houston (Note: Haley states, "the settlement that grew up around it became known as Hughstown, the common source of variant family spellings of Houstoun, Houston, and Huston".) (/ˈhuːstən/ HOO-stən), in Renfrewshire, Scotland.

== Biography ==
Houston, given his father's name, was born in 1689 or 1690 in Ulster in the northern reaches of the Kingdom of Ireland (1542–1800). (Note: According to family historian Archibald Wood Houston, in 1895, his father, was Samuel Houston (also stated as John Samuel Houston), who married Margaret McClung.) Around 1735, Houston, his wife, four sons, two daughters, and his widowed mother left Ireland for Pennsylvania; (Note: His mother, born around 1650, died in Rockbridge County, Virginia at the age of 97.) one of their seven children, James, stayed in Ireland and died there.

According to Marquis James, Sam Houston's biographer, the family left Belfast, Ireland, for Pennsylvania in 1730. They and other families carried gold sovereigns on their transatlantic journey, which was rare among immigrants. The ship's master, with others, planned to steal the money. The passengers were made aware of the scheme in the mid-Atlantic and they took control of the ship, apprehended the captain and put him in chains, and navigated the ship into the port of Philadelphia. The Houstons settled in Lancaster, Pennsylvania. While in Pennsylvania, Houston's two daughters and a son, John, were married. They were Houston's three eldest children.

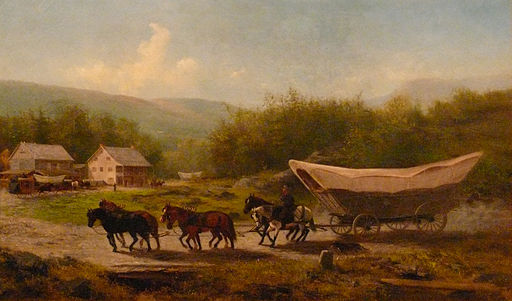
Conestoga wagons on the Great Wagon Road

The family traveled along the Great Wagon Road, through the Shenandoah Valley, to Old Augusta County, Virginia (now Rockbridge County, Virginia) around 1742 or 1745, where Houston acquired Borden's Tract from Benjamin Borden for $25 for 100 acres. (Note: The property is also called Burden's Land.) They traveled with other Scot-Irish Presbyterian families who intended to build churches and schools. Houston built a stockade fort that provided some safety from wild animals and Native Americans. His house was large enough to take in a number of families. A grammar school and a log meetinghouse known as the Old Providence Church, were established near the fort. (Note: The John Houston mentioned in the book may have been Houston, or his son John.) The New Providence Church was established for the members who lived in the lower settlement, near Walker's and Hays' Creeks.

Houston established the Timber Ridge Plantation (now the site of Church Hill in Lexington, Virginia). He contracted with indentured servants for their labor for a specified number of years. Among the first to do so, he purchased African Americans to be his slaves, and expanded the amount of acreage and the number of enslaved people as he prospered. He served as a judge and military soldier, fighting the French and Native Americans. He became unofficially known as Squire Houston.

1751 Fry-Jefferson map depicting the Virginia Colony and surrounding provinces in 1752

In 1754, he was clearing a field in Augusta, during which he set a tree on fire. The tree fell on him and he died. Houston was buried at the Old Providence Church. His son Robert took over management, as well as the gentrification, of Timber Ridge.

== Personal life ==
He married Mary Margaret Cunningham and they had six or seven children. Their children were: Robert, Isabella, Esther, John III, Samuel, Matthew, and James.

== Legacy ==
Sam Houston was Houston's great grandson, who descended through his grandparents John Houston II and Sarah Todd and his parents Samuel and Elizabeth Paxton Houston. (Note: The Paxtons and Houstons immigrated to America together from Ireland.)

Houston family tree
- John Houston m. Margaret McClung (c.1650–1735) Ireland
  - John Houston (1690–1755) m. Margaret Mary Cunningham (1694–1754), both born in Ireland and died in Virginia
    - James Houston, died in Ireland
    - Robert H. Houston (1720–1760), born in Ireland, died in Virginia m.Margaret Dunlap Davidson (b. 1720)
      - John Houston m. Anna Logan
      - Samuel Davidson Houston (1745–1807) m. Elizabeth Blair Paxton (1757–1831)
        - Paxton Houston
        - Robert Houston
        - James Houston (1782–1824) m. Rebecca G. Herndon
        - John P. Houston (1790–1838)
        - Sam Houston (1793–1863)
          - m. Eliza Allen (m. 1829 div. 1837)
          - m. Tiana "Diana" (Rogers) Gentry (m. 1830) (died 1838)
          - m. Margaret Moffette Lea (1819–1867) (Note: Married Samuel Houston.) m. (May 9, 1840 - his death)
            - Sam Houston Jr., MD (1843–1894) (Note: Child of Samuel and Margaret Houston.) m. Lucy Anderson (1845–1886) (Note: Married.)
              - Margaret Bell Houston (1876–1966) (Note: Child of Sam and Lucy. (Note: SR staff (November 26, 2013), "Samuel Houston Family Tree", Star of the Republic Museum, Blinn College Second Generation))
              - Nellie Houston (1879–1882)
              - Harry Howard Houston (1883–1935)
            - Nancy "Nannie" Elizabeth (1846–1920) m. Joseph Clay Stiles Morrow (1839–1925)
              - Margaret Houston Morrow (1867–1948) m. Robert Alexander John (1864–1933) (Note: Child of Nancy and Joseph.)
                - Jean Houston John (b.1891) m. Franklin T. Baldwin (b.1889)
                  - Jean Houston Baldwin (1916–2002) m. Governor Price Daniel (1910–1988)
                    - Price Daniel Jr. (1941–1981) Speaker of the Texas House of Representatives 1973–1975
              - Emily Preston Morrow (1869–1892)
              - Jennie Belle Morrow (1871–1977)
              - Preston Morrow (1875–1909)
              - Temple Houston Morrow (1878–1966)
              - Elizabeth Paxton Morrow (1886–1906)
            - Margaret Lea Houston (1848–1906) m. Captain Weston Lafayette Williams (1835–1899)
              - Houston Williams (1869–1931) (Note: Child of Margaret and Weston.)
              - Margaret Madge Williams (1872–1955)
              - Franklin Weston Williams (1874–1958)
              - James Royston Williams (1877–1953)
              - Marian Lee Williams (b. 1880)
            - Mary William Houston (1850–1931) m. John Simeon Morrow (1840–1886)
              - John Houston Morrow (1871–1916) (Note: Child of Mary and John.)
              - Andrew Morrow (1875–1881)
              - Jesse Morrow (b.1876)
              - Jessie Lea Morrow (1885–1975)
              - Maude Louise Morrow (1883–1957)
            - Antoinette Power Houston (1852–1932) m. Dr. William S. Lorraine Bringhurst (1844–1913)
              - Sam Houston Bringhurst (b.1874) (Note: Child of Antoinette and William.)
              - Charles Raguet Bringhurst (1880–1882)
              - William Stuart Bringhurst (b.1885)
              - Nettie Houston Bringhurst (1887–1935)
              - Anna Katherine Bringhurst (1890–1895))
            - Andrew Jackson Houston (1854–1941) United States Senator
              - m. Carrie Glenn Purnell (1858–1884)
                - Ariadne T. Houston (1879–1969) (Note: Child of Andrew and Carrie.)
                - Margaret Houston (1882–1943)
                - Carrie Marie Houston (1883–1893)
              - m. Elizabeth Hart Good (1864–1907)
                - Josephine Anna Houston (1889–1914) (Note: Child of Andrew and Elizabeth.)
            - William Rogers Houston (1858–1920)
            - Temple Lea Houston (1860–1905), Texas state senator 1885–1888 m. Laura Cross (1863–1938)
              - Temple Lea Houston Jr. (1884–1920) (Note: Child of Temple and Laura.)
              - Louise Houston (1885–1887)
              - Samuel Houston III (1892–1952)
              - Richard Caldon Houston (1895–1974)
                - Richard Temple Houston (1931-2021)
                  - Daniel L. Houston
                  - Sheridan E. Hollender
                  - Mark P. Houston
              - Mary Houston (1898–1977)
        - William Houston m. Mary Ball
        - Isabella Houston
        - Mary Houston
          - m. Col. Matthew Wallace
          - m. Gen. William Wallace
        - Eliza Houston m. Samuel Moore
      - Bettie Houston m. James McClung
      - Margaret Houston
      - Esther Houston
      - Mary Houston
    - Isabelia Houston
    - Esther Houston
    - John Houston
    - Samuel Nelson Houston m. Susan (Strickler)
      - Henry H. Houston
    - Mathew Houston
Notes

Bibliography

- Ellis, Franklin; Evans, Samuel (1883). History of Lancaster County, Pennsylvania: With Biographical Sketches of Many of Its Pioneers and Prominent Men. Everts & Peck. pp. 591–592.
