= Church Hill (Lexington, Virginia) =

Historic house in Virginia, United States

- U.S. National Register of Historic Places
- Virginia Landmarks Register
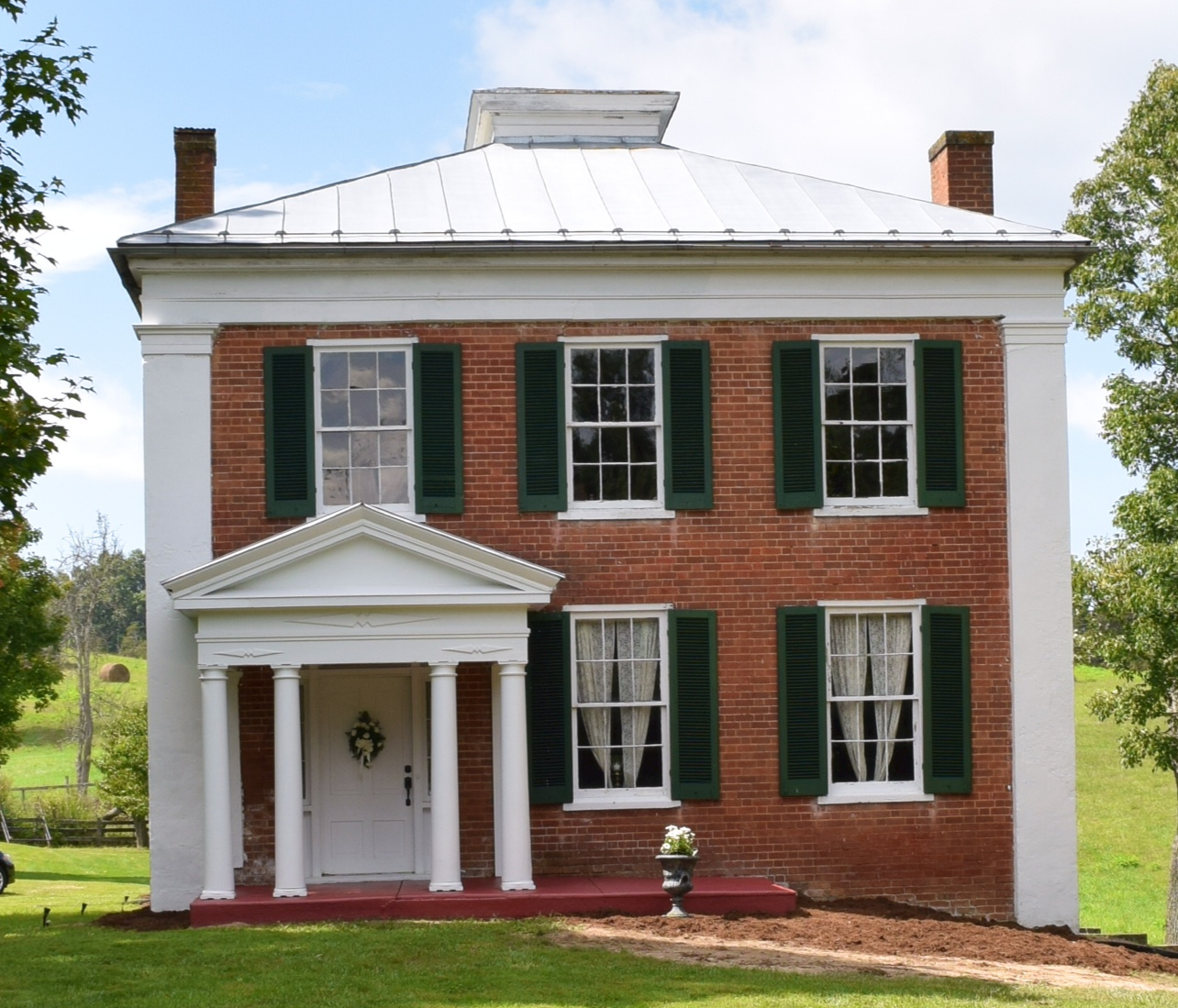
- Front of the house

- Location within Virginia Location within the United States
- Location: 6.5 mi. NE of Lexington off U.S.11 at I-64, near Lexington, Virginia
- Coordinates: 37°50′30″N 79°21′32″W
- Area: 4 acres (1.6 ha)
- Built: 1848
- Architectural style: Greek Revival
- NRHP reference No.: 79003079
- VLR No.: 081-0065

Significant dates
- Added to NRHP: February 26, 1979
- Designated VLR: June 21, 1977

Church Hill, also known as Timber Ridge Plantation, is a historic plantation house located near Lexington, Rockbridge County, Virginia. It was built circa 1848, and is a two-story, three-bay, rectangular brick Greek Revival style dwelling. It has a one-story, rear kitchen ell. The house features stuccoed Doric order pilasters at the corners and midpoints of the long sides. Timber Ridge Plantation was the birthplace of Sam Houston (1793–1863). On the property is a non-contributing log building which tradition claims was constructed from logs salvaged from the Sam Houston birthplace cabin. The cabin is believed to have been located at the site of the kitchen ell.

It was listed on the National Register of Historic Places in 1979.

== See also ==
- John Houston (1690–1754), who established Timber Ridge Plantation
