= Avery Lenoir Matlock =

American politician

Member of the Texas House of Representatives from the 52nd district
- In office January 11, 1881 – January 9, 1883
- Preceded by: George Bibb Pickett
- Succeeded by: John Anderson McAlpine

Member of the Texas Senate from the 19th district
- In office January 9, 1883 – September 24, 1884
- Preceded by: James B. Stubbs
- Succeeded by: Temple Lea Houston

Personal details
- Born: April 23, 1852
- Died: July 13, 1933 (aged 81)
- Party: Democratic

Avery Lenoir Matlock (April 23, 1852 – July 13, 1933) was an American politician. A member of the Democratic Party, he served in the Texas House of Representatives from 1881 to 1883 and in the Texas Senate from 1883 to 1884.
