= Mary Smith Jones =

First Lady of Republic of Texas

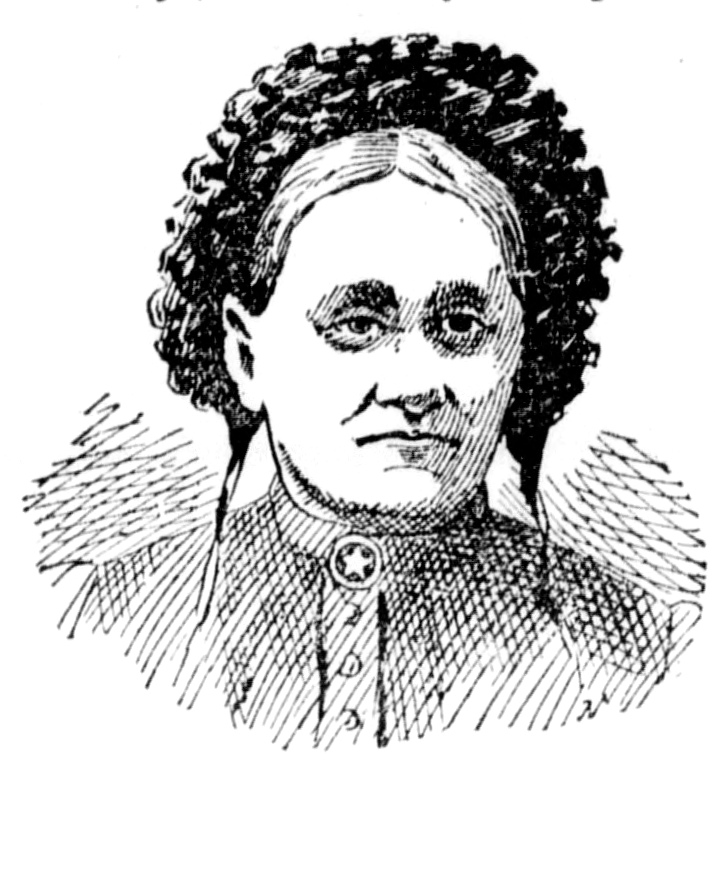

First Lady of the Republic of Texas
- In office December 9, 1844 – February 19, 1846
- Governor: Anson Jones
- Preceded by: Margaret Lea Houston

1st President General, Daughters of the Republic of Texas
- Preceded by: Office established

Personal details
- Born: Mary Smith; July 24, 1819 Lawrence County, Arkansas, US
- Died: December 31, 1907 (aged 88) Houston, Texas, US
- Resting place: Glenwood Cemetery
- Spouse: Anson Jones
- Children: 4
- Known for: First Lady of Republic of Texas (1844–1846); First president Daughters of the Republic of Texas

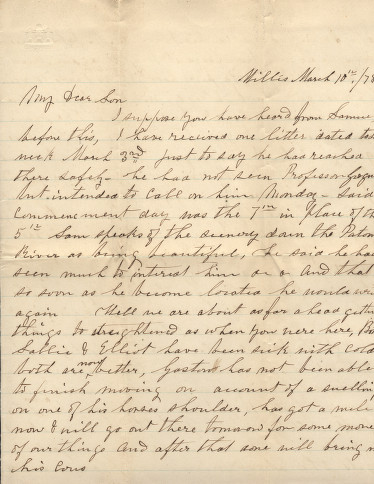
Letter from Mary Jones to her son Cromwell Jones, March 10, 1878

Mary Smith Jones (July 24, 1819 – December 31, 1907) was the last First Lady of the Republic of Texas, as wife of Anson Jones, the last president of the Republic. She was the first president of the newly founded Daughters of the Republic of Texas in 1891.

== Early life ==
Mary Smith was born on July 24, 1819, to John McCutcheon Smith and his wife Sarah Pevehouse Smith, in Lawrence County, Arkansas. Her father died in 1833, and the family relocated to the Mexican state of Coahuila y Tejas. Mary became part of a large family of step-siblings when her mother remarried to John Woodruff. Due to growing political tensions and subsequent military operations leading up to the Texas Revolution, the Woodruffs moved a number of times, finally settling in Houston. Mary's first husband at age 19 was a soldier named Hugh McCrory. The marriage was cut short by McCrory's untimely death in 1837. He was buried at Founders Memorial Cemetery, and a cenotaph remains at this site for Mary Smith Jones as well.

== Anson Jones ==
On May 17, 1840, Mary wed Austin physician Anson Jones, whom she had met when he rented a room at her mother's boarding house. The couple had three sons and one daughter: Samuel, Charles, Cromwell, and Sallie. Jones was well-traveled and at one point had lived in Venezuela. Prior to his marriage to Mary, he had held positions in both the private sector, and in the government of the Republic of Texas. In 1844, Jones became the last President of the Republic of Texas, with Mary as the last First Lady. His opposition to annexation created a volatile climate, and some had pushed for his impeachment. When Texas was annexed in 1845, Jones retired to private life. He suffered a debilitating accident a few years later. Although he held false hopes that he would be elected to the United States Senate, he had become bitter. Jones killed himself in 1858. Mary Smith Jones then moved with her children first to Galveston and then onto a farm in Harris County.

== Final years ==
Mary Smith Jones became the first president of the Daughters of the Republic of Texas in 1891, and a member of the Texas State Historical Association. The suicide of Anson Jones left Mary and the children strapped for money, and forced to sell their land and home at Washington-on-the-Brazos. Ashbel Smith assisted the family with purchase of land near Galveston. Mary also relied on Smith in 1860 to take a manuscript of her husband's Memoranda to New York for publication; all printed copies of the manuscript remained stored away and undistributed until 1929.

She spent her remaining years living with her children, and dealing with the financial issues of her husband's estate. Mary Smith Jones never remarried. She died in 1907 and is buried next to Anson Jones at Glenwood Cemetery in Houston, Texas.

Honorary titles
Preceded by Margaret Lea Houston	First Lady of the Republic of Texas; 1844–1846	Succeeded by NA
