= Soiled Dove Plea =

1899 speech by Temple Lea Houston

The Soiled Dove Plea was a speech delivered by the attorney Temple Lea Houston on behalf of a prostitute, Minnie Stacey, in 1899 in Woodward, Oklahoma. The accused prostitute was scheduled to be tried for prostitution one morning, and the judge discovered she had neither attorney nor money. Houston agreed to defend her and delivered extemporaneously the Soiled Dove speech also known as the Plea for a Fallen Woman (the term "soiled dove" is a 19th-century euphemism for a prostitute). It is considered by many trial attorneys to be the perfect closing argument. The all-male jury acquitted the accused by unanimous verdict as soon as they reached the jury room.

== Text ==
The speech:

"Gentlemen of the jury: You heard with what cold cruelty the prosecution referred to the sins of this woman, as if her condition were of her own preference. The evidence has painted you a picture of her life and surroundings. Do you think that they were embraced of her own choosing? Do you think that she willingly embraced a life so revolting and horrible? Ah, no! Gentlemen, one of our own sex was the author of her ruin, more to blame than she.

Then let us judge her gently. What could be more pathetic than the spectacle she presents? An immortal soul in ruin! Where the star of purity once glittered on her girlish brow, burning shame has set its seal and forever. And only a moment ago, they reproached her for the depths to which she had sunk, the company she kept, the life she led. Now, what else is left her? Where can she go and her sin not pursue her? Gentlemen, the very promises of God are denied her. He said: "Come unto me all ye that labor and are heavy laden and I will give you rest." She has indeed labored, and is heavily laden, but if, at this instant she were to kneel before us all and confess to her Redeemer and beseech His tender mercies, where is the church that would receive her? And even if they accepted her, when she passed the portals to worship and to claim her rest, scorn and mockery would greet her; those she met would gather around them their spirits the more closely to avoid the pollution of her touch. And would you tell me a single employment where she can realize "Give us our daily bread?"

Our sex wrecked her once pure life. Her own sex shrink from her as they would the pestilence. Society has reared its relentless walls against her, and only in the friendly shelter of the grave can her betrayed and broken heart ever find the Redeemer's promised rest.

They told you of her assumed names, as fleeting as the shadows on the walls, of her sins, her habits, but they never told you of her sorrows, and who shall tell what her heart, sinful though it may be, now feels? When the remembered voices of mother and sisters, whom she must see no more on this earth, fall again like music on her erring soul, and she prays God that she could only return, and must not—no—not in this life, for the seducer has destroyed the soul.

You know the story of the prodigal son, but he was a son. He was one of us, like her destroyers; but for the prodigal daughter there is no return. Were she with her wasted form and bleeding feet to drag herself back to home, she, the fallen and the lost, which would be her welcome? Oh, consider this when you come to decide her guilt, for she is before us and we must judge her. They (the prosecution) sneer and scoff at her. One should respect her grief, and I tell you that there reigns over her penitent and chastened spirit a desolation now that none, no, none but the Searcher of all hearts can ever know.

None of us are utterly evil, and I remember that when the Saffron Scourge swept over the city of Memphis in 1878, a courtesan there opened wide the doors of her gilded palace of sin to admit the sufferers, and when the scythe of the Reaper swung fast and pitiless, she was angelic in her ministering. Death called her in the midst of her mercies, and she went to join those she tried to save. She, like those the Lord forgave, was a sinner, and yet I believe that in the days of reckoning her judgment will be lighter than those who would prosecute and seek to drive off the earth such poor unfortunates as her whom you are to judge.

They wish to fine this woman and make her leave. They wish to wring from the wages of her shame the price of this meditated injustice; to take from her the little money she might have—and God knows, gentlemen, it came hard enough. The old Jewish law told you that the price of a dog, nor the hire of such as she, should come not within the house of the Lord, and I say unto you that our justice, fitly symbolized by this woman's form, does not ask that you add to the woes of this unhappy one, one only asks at your hands the pitiful privilege of being left alone.

The Master, while on Earth, while He spake in wrath and rebuke to the kings and rulers, never reproached one of these. One he forgave. Another he acquitted. You remember both—and now looking upon this friendless outcast, if any of you can say to her, 'I am holier than thou' in the respect which she is charged with sinning, who is he? The Jews who brought the woman before the Savior have been held up to execution for two thousand years. I always respected them. A man who will yield to the reproaches of his conscience as they did has the element of good in him, but the modern hypocrite has no such compunctions. If the prosecutors of the woman whom you are trying had brought her before the Savior, they would have accepted His challenge and each one gathered a rock and stoned her, in the twinkling of an eye. No, Gentlemen, do as your Master did twice under the same circumstances that surround you. Tell her to go in peace."
