= Temple Lea Houston =

American politician (1860–1905)

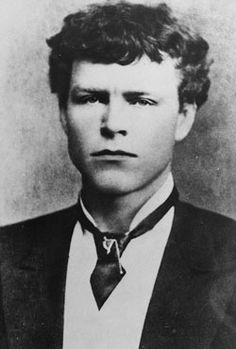
- Houston as a young man in Texas c. 1880s

Member of the Texas Senate from the 19th (Note: Based in Mobeetie in Wheeler County) district
- In office January 13, 1885 – January 8, 1889
- Preceded by: Avery Lenoir Matlock
- Succeeded by: John Hall Stephens

Personal details
- Born: August 12, 1860 Austin, Texas, U.S.
- Died: August 15, 1905 (aged 45) Woodward, Oklahoma, U.S.
- Resting place: Elmwood Cemetery in Woodward, Oklahoma, U.S.
- Party: Democratic
- Spouse: Laura Cross Houston
- Children: 7
- Education: Baylor University
- Occupation: Lawyer

Temple Lea Houston (August 12, 1860 – August 15, 1905) was an American attorney and politician who served from 1885 to 1889 in the Texas State Senate. He was the last-born child of Margaret Lea Houston and Sam Houston, the first elected president of the Republic of Texas. (Note: David G. Burnet was the first president of the Republic of Texas, serving on an interim basis March 18 – October 22, 1836, while Sam Houston led the army against the Mexican forces. After Houston's capture of Santa Anna, elections were held in the Republic and he became the first elected president of the Republic and later the third president. After Texas was annexed by the United States, Sam Houston became a United States senator from Texas, and was later elected as the state's seventh governor.)

== Biography ==
Coat of Arms of Temple Lea Houston

Temple Lea Houston was the only one of the Houstons' eight children to be born in the Texas governor's residence in Austin in 1860. By the time he was seven in 1867, both his parents had died. He lived with an older sister and her family in nearby Georgetown, Texas. At the age of 13, Houston left home to join a cattle drive, and later worked on a riverboat on the Mississippi River. Aided by a friend of his father, he gained an appointment as a page in the U.S. Senate, and worked in Washington, DC, for three years.

Houston returned to Texas in 1877 at the age of 17 to attend the Agricultural and Mechanical College (later Texas A&M University). He transferred to Baylor University in Waco, where he graduated in 1880 with honors in law and philosophy. He "read the law" with an established firm and was admitted to the bar. He was the youngest attorney in Texas when he opened his practice. That year, he was appointed as the attorney for Brazoria County near Houston, Texas.

In 1882, Houston was appointed as the district attorney of the 35th Judicial District of Texas, which then covered a large part of the Texas Panhandle, based in Mobeetie, Wheeler County.

Houston carried a Colt revolver, which he named "Old Betsy", always strapped to his waist. Some called him "the best shot in the West." He wore buckskin attire from Mexico and a sombrero with a wide brim and a silver eagle. Like his father, he was more than six feet tall. He had gray eyes; his auburn hair was usually shoulder-length. His knowledge of the Bible and classical literature was all-encompassing. He easily commanded the attention of any audience.

== Marriage and family ==
Established in his career, on February 14, 1883, 23-year-old Houston married Laura Cross, the daughter of a planter. They lived near Fort Elliott, which protected the border against American Indians, as well as the important cattle drives. The couple had seven children, only four of whom lived past infancy. His 4 year old daughter, Samantha, died of a fall at the Driskill Hotel in Texas in 1897. Her ghost surrounds the haunted folklore behind the painting "Love Letters" which her father had asked a painter to make in memory of his daughter.

== Political career ==
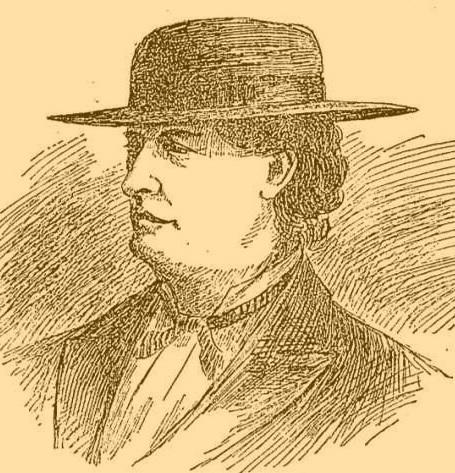
Chicago Tribune, June 21, 1896

Houston was elected in 1884 to a single term in the Texas State Senate from District 19.

He concentrated his law practice on the Santa Fe railroad (the Atchison, Topeka and Santa Fe Railway). He spoke French and Spanish, as well as seven Indian languages. In 1888, he gave the dedication address for the opening of the Texas State Capitol, which is still in use after several renovations.

Houston participated in the Oklahoma Territory's Land Run of 1893. In 1894, Houston moved his family to the cattle town of Woodward in Oklahoma Territory. He was legal counsel of the Atchison, Topeka and Santa Fe Railway; its Woodward depot became one of the most important points in the territory for cattle shipping to the East. Houston became widely known and popular for his courtroom dramatics. He was charged with murder in the shooting of a brother of the outlaw Al Jennings, after an argument in the Cabinet Saloon, and was acquitted.

Houston won a reputation as a brilliant trial lawyer. In 1899, he delivered his "Soiled Dove Plea" in a makeshift courtroom in Woodward's opera house. The argument on behalf of Minnie Stacey, a prostitute who worked at the Dew Drop Inn, became famous for winning her acquittal after ten minutes' consideration by the jury.

Houston had agreed to be a candidate in Oklahoma's first gubernatorial election, but died two years before statehood.

== Death ==
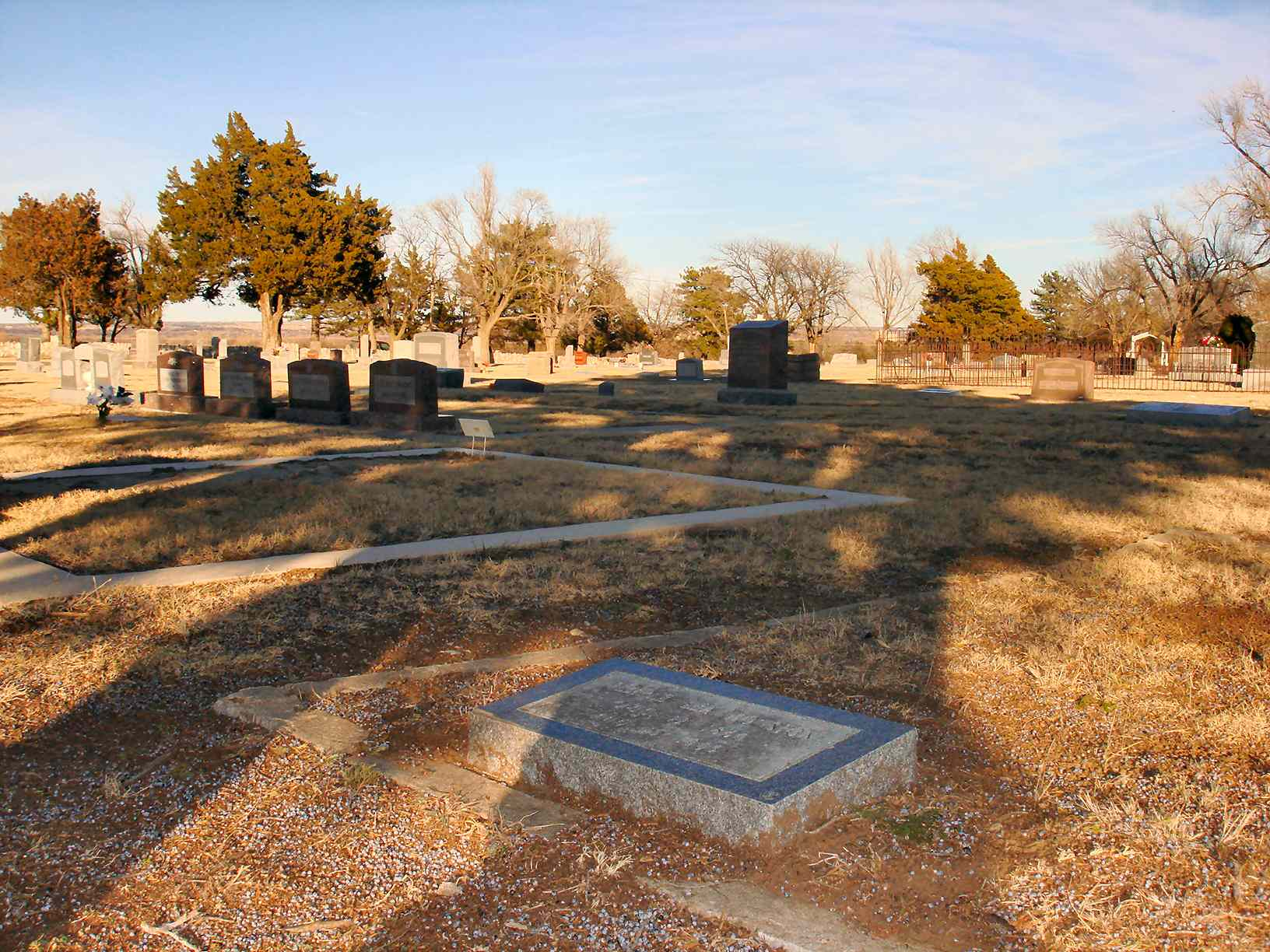
Temple Lea Houston Grave, Elmwood Cemetery, Woodward, Oklahoma

Houston died of a cerebral hemorrhage on August 15, 1905, in Woodward, then still Oklahoma Territory. His wife Laura lived until April 17, 1938. They are buried together at Elmwood Cemetery in Woodward.

== Representation in other media ==
- Edna Ferber modeled her main character of Yancey Cravat on Temple Houston in her novel Cimarron (1929). (The novel was adapted as film versions under the same name, produced in 1931 and 1960.)
- Ross Elliott played Houston in "The Reluctant Gun" (1959) episode of the Western anthology series, Death Valley Days.
- In the 1960 film Oklahoma Territory, Houston was played by Bill Williams. Gloria Talbott was cast as Ruth Red Hawk, Ted de Corsia as Chief Buffalo Horn, X Brands as Running Cloud, and Walter Sande as Marshal Pete Rosslyn. The film was written by Orville H. Hampton and directed by Edward L. Cahn.
- A 1963–1964 NBC/Warner Bros. television series entitled Temple Houston, which aired 26 episodes, was co-produced by actor Jeffrey Hunter, who also played the part of Houston. Temple Houston was placed on the schedule in a matter of six weeks after it was sold by studio boss Jack Webb to the network.

=== Houston family tree ===
Houston family tree
- John Houston m. Margaret McClung (c.1650–1735) Ireland
  - John Houston (1690–1755) m. Margaret Mary Cunningham (1694–1754), both born in Ireland and died in Virginia
    - James Houston, died in Ireland
    - Robert H. Houston (1720–1760), born in Ireland, died in Virginia m.Margaret Dunlap Davidson (b. 1720)
      - John Houston m. Anna Logan
      - Samuel Davidson Houston (1745–1807) m. Elizabeth Blair Paxton (1757–1831)
        - Paxton Houston
        - Robert Houston
        - James Houston (1782–1824) m. Rebecca G. Herndon
        - John P. Houston (1790–1838)
        - Sam Houston (1793–1863)
          - m. Eliza Allen (m. 1829 div. 1837)
          - m. Tiana "Diana" (Rogers) Gentry (m. 1830) (died 1838)
          - m. Margaret Moffette Lea (1819–1867) (Note: Married Samuel Houston.) m. (May 9, 1840 - his death)
            - Sam Houston Jr., MD (1843–1894) (Note: Child of Samuel and Margaret Houston.) m. Lucy Anderson (1845–1886) (Note: Married.)
              - Margaret Bell Houston (1876–1966) (Note: Child of Sam and Lucy. (Note: SR staff (November 26, 2013), "Samuel Houston Family Tree", Star of the Republic Museum, Blinn College Second Generation))
              - Nellie Houston (1879–1882)
              - Harry Howard Houston (1883–1935)
            - Nancy "Nannie" Elizabeth (1846–1920) m. Joseph Clay Stiles Morrow (1839–1925)
              - Margaret Houston Morrow (1867–1948) m. Robert Alexander John (1864–1933) (Note: Child of Nancy and Joseph.)
                - Jean Houston John (b.1891) m. Franklin T. Baldwin (b.1889)
                  - Jean Houston Baldwin (1916–2002) m. Governor Price Daniel (1910–1988)
                    - Price Daniel Jr. (1941–1981) Speaker of the Texas House of Representatives 1973–1975
              - Emily Preston Morrow (1869–1892)
              - Jennie Belle Morrow (1871–1977)
              - Preston Morrow (1875–1909)
              - Temple Houston Morrow (1878–1966)
              - Elizabeth Paxton Morrow (1886–1906)
            - Margaret Lea Houston (1848–1906) m. Captain Weston Lafayette Williams (1835–1899)
              - Houston Williams (1869–1931) (Note: Child of Margaret and Weston.)
              - Margaret Madge Williams (1872–1955)
              - Franklin Weston Williams (1874–1958)
              - James Royston Williams (1877–1953)
              - Marian Lee Williams (b. 1880)
            - Mary William Houston (1850–1931) m. John Simeon Morrow (1840–1886)
              - John Houston Morrow (1871–1916) (Note: Child of Mary and John.)
              - Andrew Morrow (1875–1881)
              - Jesse Morrow (b.1876)
              - Jessie Lea Morrow (1885–1975)
              - Maude Louise Morrow (1883–1957)
            - Antoinette Power Houston (1852–1932) m. Dr. William S. Lorraine Bringhurst (1844–1913)
              - Sam Houston Bringhurst (b.1874) (Note: Child of Antoinette and William.)
              - Charles Raguet Bringhurst (1880–1882)
              - William Stuart Bringhurst (b.1885)
              - Nettie Houston Bringhurst (1887–1935)
              - Anna Katherine Bringhurst (1890–1895))
            - Andrew Jackson Houston (1854–1941) United States Senator
              - m. Carrie Glenn Purnell (1858–1884)
                - Ariadne T. Houston (1879–1969) (Note: Child of Andrew and Carrie.)
                - Margaret Houston (1882–1943)
                - Carrie Marie Houston (1883–1893)
              - m. Elizabeth Hart Good (1864–1907)
                - Josephine Anna Houston (1889–1914) (Note: Child of Andrew and Elizabeth.)
            - William Rogers Houston (1858–1920)
            - Temple Lea Houston (1860–1905), Texas state senator 1885–1888 m. Laura Cross (1863–1938)
              - Temple Lea Houston Jr. (1884–1920) (Note: Child of Temple and Laura.)
              - Louise Houston (1885–1887)
              - Samuel Houston III (1892–1952)
              - Richard Caldon Houston (1895–1974)
                - Richard Temple Houston (1931-2021)
                  - Daniel L. Houston
                  - Sheridan E. Hollender
                  - Mark P. Houston
              - Mary Houston (1898–1977)
        - William Houston m. Mary Ball
        - Isabella Houston
        - Mary Houston
          - m. Col. Matthew Wallace
          - m. Gen. William Wallace
        - Eliza Houston m. Samuel Moore
      - Bettie Houston m. James McClung
      - Margaret Houston
      - Esther Houston
      - Mary Houston
    - Isabelia Houston
    - Esther Houston
    - John Houston
    - Samuel Nelson Houston m. Susan (Strickler)
      - Henry H. Houston
    - Mathew Houston
Notes

Bibliography

- Ellis, Franklin; Evans, Samuel (1883). History of Lancaster County, Pennsylvania: With Biographical Sketches of Many of Its Pioneers and Prominent Men. Everts & Peck. pp. 591–592.

== Notes ==
Preceded by Avery Lenoir Matlock	Texas State Senator from District 19 (then 26 unorganized counties in the Panhandle based in Mobeetie); 1885–1889	Succeeded by John Hall Stephens
