= Ashbel Smith =

American politician

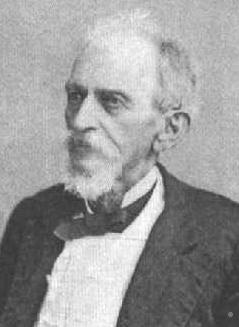
Dr. Ashbel Smith of Texas

Ashbel Smith (August 13, 1805 – January 21, 1886) was a slave owner, key anti-abolitionist, pioneer medical doctor, diplomat, and official of the Republic of Texas, Confederate officer and first President of the Board of Regents of the University of Texas. Smith helped lead efforts to keep Texas a Republic and slave state.

== Early life ==
Coat of arms of Ashbel Smith

Smith was born on August 13, 1805, in Hartford, Connecticut, United States, and attended Hartford public schools. He graduated from Yale University at the age of 19 where he was a member of Phi Beta Kappa Honor society. Smith taught briefly in a private school in Salisbury, North Carolina, and then attended medical school at Yale graduating as medical doctor in 1828.

Smith later lived in France and during the Paris cholera epidemic of 1832, Smith helped to treat the sick and wrote a pamphlet on the disease. Returning to the United States, Smith began his medical practice in Salisbury, North Carolina. He became active politically and part owner of the newspaper the Western Carolinian. In the fall of 1836, Smith was persuaded to move to Texas by J. Pinckney Henderson, whom Smith had become friends with in Salisbury and was already in Texas.

== Texas settler ==
Upon arriving in Texas in 1837, Smith quickly became a close acquaintance of Sam Houston and was appointed to the post of surgeon general with the Republic of Texas Army. Even though militarily the Texas Revolution was over, Smith set up an efficient system of medical operations and established the first hospital in the area that would become Houston. As President of the Republic of Texas, Sam Houston called on Smith to negotiate a treaty with the Comanches in 1838. The Texas Congress failed to ratify the treaty, which would have recognized a Comanche homeland, the Comancheria, thus leading to the Council House Fight and Great Raid of 1840.

A supporter of public education, Smith was a charter member and first vice president of the Philosophical Society of Texas. The society immediately set about to request that the Texas Congress establish a system of public education in Texas.

In 1839, a yellow fever epidemic broke out in Galveston, and Smith treated the victims of the disease while writing reports about the treatment of the disease in the Galveston News. As a result of this experience, he wrote the first treatise on yellow fever in Texas. He purchased land near Galveston Bay and built his plantation, Evergreen, in southeast Harris County in what is now Baytown, Texas.

== Texas diplomat and secretary of state ==
In President Sam Houston's second term (1841–1844), Dr. Smith was Minister Plenipotentiary from the Republic of Texas to the United Kingdom of Great Britain and Ireland and France, residing in London and Paris, respectively. He also traveled to Rome on a diplomatic mission to Pope Gregory XVI. In Europe, Smith secured ratification of a treaty of amity and commerce between Britain and Texas and improved the Republic's relations with France, which had been ruffled by the so-called Pig War. On his return from Europe in 1845, Smith was appointed Secretary of State by President Anson Jones. With the possibility of annexation by the United States Smith worked to give the people of Texas a choice between remaining an independent republic and being annexed. To facilitate this, he negotiated a treaty, in which Mexico recognized the independence of Texas, won in 1836, and in return Texas would not be annexed by another country. This treaty, known as the Cuevas-Smith treaty, angered many Texans who were strong supporters of annexation, and Smith was burned in effigy by citizens of Galveston and San Felipe. This treaty was rejected by the Texan Congress which preferred the annexation resolutions, and thus, Texas was annexed by the United States on December 29, 1845, and became the 28th state of the Union in early 1846.

Smith served the Republic of Texas as chargé d'affaires to Britain and France from 1842 through 1844. Alleging that British interests was conspiring with the Republic of Mexico against Texas, Smith filed a formal diplomatic protest to Lord Aberdeen. British shipyards were at that time constructing two warships for the Mexican Navy, which Smith cited as evidence of a possible invasion of Texas. As a matter of fact, Mexico had not yet recognized the Texas government. Andrew J. Torget wrote, "Smith feared an alliance of Mexican nationalists and British anti-abolitionists, would, left unchecked, guaranteed future invasions of Texas."

While British foreign policy generally encouraged abolition in other countries, Lord Aberdeen pledged that his government would not interfere with Texan slavery, even while he admitted publicly that abolition of slavery in the region would be desirable. Furthermore, Aberdeen was in communication with abolitionists in Texas, such as Stephen Pearl Andrews. Texas abolitionists were optimistic about their cause and reported that Texas would remain an independent republic, but one which would abolish slavery. Aberdeen, however, dispatched the British consul in Galveston, William Kennedy, to investigate this claim. Kennedy pointed out that the enslaved population of Texas was growing and manumission was rare, concluding that there was no broad abolitionist sentiment in Texas. Smith carefully tracked these communications between British diplomats and Texas abolitionists, and made defense of slavery and the cotton trade as his two preoccupations. Meanwhile, Lord Aberdeen continued his reassurances to Smith that Britain would not meddle in Texas' domestic affairs, which satisfied his concerns.

== Soldier, physician, and proponent of slavery ==
The Mexican War is part of the mission of the destiny allotted to the Anglo-Saxon race on this continent. It is our destiny, our mission to Americanize this continent... The sword is the great civilizer."—Ashbel Smith

Smith served as a surgeon in the U.S. Army during the Mexican–American War (1846–1848) on active duty with General Zachary Taylor in the field. He also served as president of the board of visitors to the United States Military Academy at West Point in 1848. After the Mexican–American War, Smith returned to Texas and, in 1851, he served as a commissioner from the United States to the London Industrial Exposition. On July 31, 1843, Smith wrote in a report to President of the Republic of Texas, Anson Jones, to update him on his efforts to gain London's support to keep Texas a Republic and to make clear their position on slavery. Smith updated Jones on European affairs concerning Texas after a Mr. Andrews, an anti-slavery Texan, was in England gathering support for abolition, which would further Britain's goal of global emancipation. Smith met with Lord Aberdeen and stated emphatically that Texas would not surrender its slaves because to do so would be dishonorable. He outlined all of the proposed plans for Texas abolition and how each would never work, especially since most potential emigrants were more worried about war than slavery. On the continent, news was brighter because France was backing away from demanding abolition, peace between Texas and Mexico increased Texas's standing in Europe, and Britain's influence in Spain was declining. The following year he accepted the role as manager of the first Lone Star Fair in Corpus Christi, lending a measure of credibility to that event.

On this occasion I expressed my utter dissent from and opposition to all operations then carrying on in London, having for their object the abolition of Slavery in Texas. - Ashebel Smith

In the early 1850s, Dr. Smith worked with Gail Borden to develop and promote a dried beef biscuit. When the Texas Medical Association came into being in 1853, Smith was one of the founders. In 1855, Smith was elected to the Texas House of Representatives from Harris County. In his first term, Smith supported measures to aid railroad construction, validate land titles, improve the common schools. He also served as headmaster of Houston Academy before the Civil War.

== Civil War ==
Smith supported Texas' secession from the Union in 1861. When it was clear that war was inevitable, he organized the Bayland Guards, also known as Company C of the 2nd Texas Volunteer Infantry Regiment to fight for the Confederacy. He outfitted and drilled the company, and the men elected Smith as their captain. While commanding Company C at the Battle of Shiloh in 1862, Smith received a severe arm injury and was cited for gallantry, along with the rest of his company. For his bravery, Smith was brevetted a Colonel and was given command of the 2nd Texas Volunteer Infantry Regiment. At the Battle of Vicksburg, the regiment was distinguished for its defense of a crescent-shaped fortification, which came to be known as the Second Texas Lunette. The fortification was located in the center of the Vicksburg line of defense. Under the command of Col. Smith, the Second Texas Infantry withstood two Union assaults of brigade strength directed against the lunette on May 22, 1863. After the surrender of the Confederates at Vicksburg on July 4, 1863, Smith was in charge of defenses in the vicinity of the Matagorda Peninsula on the Texas Gulf Coast and finally at the end of the war, the remnants of Second Texas was charged with defending the port of Galveston from Union control.

== After the war: focus on public education for African-Americans and women ==
At the conclusion of the Civil War, Smith and William P. Ballinger were sent by Texas Confederate Governor Pendleton Murrah as commissioners to negotiate peace terms for Texas with Union officials in New Orleans.

In 1866, Smith and his cousin Henry Gillette founded the Bayland Orphanage to care for the children of deceased Confederate veterans. Smith was also elected again as a Democratic Party state representative from Houston to the Eleventh Texas Legislature, serving for one term in 1866.

The Texas Historical Society was organized in Houston in 1870 with Ashbel Smith as its president.

According to the Handbook of Texas Online in the 1870s, "[Smith] championed public education for blacks and women and was one of three commissioners appointed by Governor Richard Coke to establish an 'Agricultural and Mechanical College of Texas, for the benefit of the Colored Youths.' This school, located five miles east of Hempstead, is now Prairie View A&M University.

Smith, with Greensville Dowell, reorganized the troubled Galveston Medical College into the Texas Medical College in 1873. As president of the Texas State Medical Association and trustee of the University of Texas, he advocated keeping the medical school in Galveston, arguing before the Texas Legislature that Galveston presented the best opportunity to study diseases.

Smith was appointed by the United States Centennial Commission in 1876 to act as a judge on the Jury of Awards at the Great International Exhibition in Philadelphia. In 1878 President Rutherford B. Hayes appointed him one of the two honorary commissioners from Texas to the Paris International Exposition.

Elected to a final two-year term in the Texas House of Representatives in 1878, Smith again represented his home county in the Sixteenth Texas Legislature. His primary focus was the establishment of a liberal arts public university with a first-class medical department. Smith was made President of the newly established University of Texas Board of Regents in 1881. Smith's goals were to recruit the best professors available for the faculty and to establish a curriculum that would make the university, which in the 1880s was still on the western frontier, a distinctive national institution of higher learning. He also saw to it that the medical branch was established in Galveston, near his home.

Smith never married. He died on January 21, 1886, at his plantation home Evergreen. In 1886, in a special meeting of the regents immediately after Ashbel's death, the regents passed resolutions affirming the school was the "living monument to the high and noble aims of Ashbel Smith," adding: "It may be said of him that he was insofar as the practical inauguration of the University is concerned the "Father of the University of Texas." He is buried in the State Cemetery in Austin.

== Memorials ==
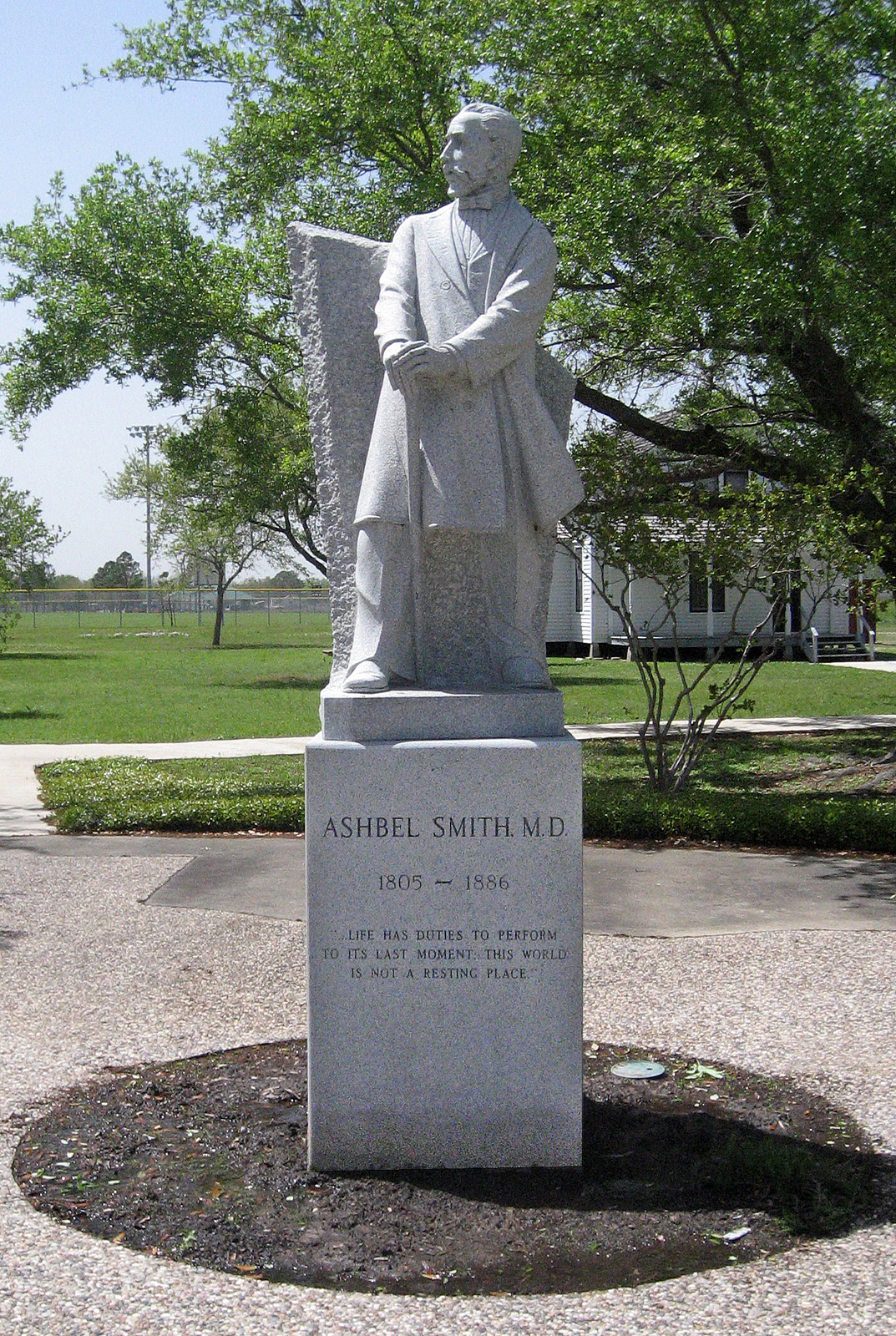
Statue of Ashbel Smith in Baytown, Texas, his home

A number of memorials exist for Dr. Ashbel Smith, including:

- Ashbel Smith Professorships throughout the University of Texas system, held by notable scholars including David Crews, Ian McCutcheon, Clarence Paul Oliver, Ilya Prigogine, Emmette Redford, David M. Young, Jr., and Morris Ziff
- The Ashbel Smith Building at the University of Texas Medical Branch in Galveston, affectionately known as "Old Red"
- The Ashbel Smith Distinguished Alumnus Award of the University of Texas-Medical Branch School of Medicine Alumni Association.
- Ashbel Smith Hall of the University of Texas System administration in Downtown Austin, demolished in 2018.
- Ashbel Street and Ashbel Smith Elementary School in Baytown, Texas, where there is a statue of Ashbel Smith, M.D.

== See also ==
- Mary Smith Jones

== Bibliography ==
- Beasley, Ellen; Fox, Stephen (1996). Galveston Architectural Guidebook. Houston: Rice University Press. ISBN 0-89263-345-X.
- Campbell, Randolph B. (1989). Empire of Slavery: The Peculiar Institution in Texas, 1821−1865. Baton Rouge: Louisiana State University Press. ISBN 0-8071-1505-3.
- Houghton, Dorothy Knox Howe; Bradley, Barrie Scardino; Howe, Katherine S.; Blackburn, Sadie Gwin (1998). Houston's Forgotten Heritage: Landscapes, Houses, Interiors, 1824−1914. College Station, TX: Texas A&M University Press. ISBN 978-1-62349-246-5.
- McCullough, David (2011). The Greater Journey: Americans in Paris. New York: Simon & Schuster. ISBN 978-1-4165-7176-6.
- Torget, Andrew J. (2015). Seeds of Empire: Cotton, Slavery, and the Transformation of the Texas Borderlands, 1800−1850. Chapel Hill, NC: University of North Carolina Press. ISBN 978-1-4696-2424-2.

Diplomatic posts
Preceded by J. Pinckney Henderson	Texas Minister to the United Kingdom and France; 1842 - 1844	Succeeded by George Whitfield Terrell
Political offices
Preceded by Ebenezer Allen	Secretary of State of the Republic of Texas; 5 February 1845 - 31 March 1845	Succeeded by Ebenezer Allen
Texas House of Representatives
Preceded by unknown	Member of the Texas House of Representatives from District 22 (Harris County); 1856–1858	Succeeded by unknown
Preceded by unknown	Member of the Texas House of Representatives from District 22 (Harris County); 1866	Succeeded by unknown
Preceded by unknown	Member of the Texas House of Representatives from District 22 (Harris County); 1879-1881	Succeeded by unknown
