= Temple Houston (TV series) =

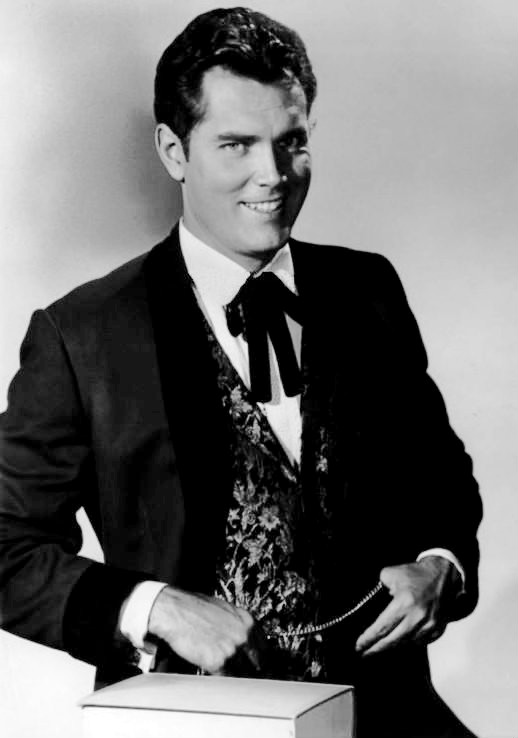
- Jeffrey Hunter in Temple Houston (1963)
- Genre: Western; Legal drama Comedy
- Directed by: Leslie H. Martinson; William Conrad; Robert Totten; Irving J. Moore; Alvin Ganzer; Robert D. Webb
- Starring: Jeffrey Hunter; Jack Elam; James Best; Frank Ferguson; Chubby Johnson; Mary Wickes
- Opening theme: "The Yellow Rose of Texas" as arranged by Frank Comstock and Ned Washington
- Country of origin: United States
- Original language: English
- No. of seasons: 1
- No. of episodes: 26

Production
- Executive producers: William T. Orr; Jack Webb; Jeffrey Hunter
- Producers: Richard M. Bluel; Joseph Dackow; Lawrence Dobkin; Jimmy Lydon
- Editor: Byron Chudnow
- Running time: 60 minutes
- Production companies: Apollo Productions; Rancom Productions Inc. Temple Houston Company; Warner Bros. Television

Original release
- Network: NBC
- Release: September 19, 1963 – April 2, 1964

Temple Houston is an American Western television series starring Jeffrey Hunter as real-life 19th-century Texas lawyer Temple Lea Houston. It ran for one season on NBC from 1963 to 1964. It is considered "the first attempt ... to produce an hour-long western series with the main character being an attorney in the formal sense." Temple Houston was the only program which Jack Webb sold to a network during his ten months as the head of production at Warner Bros. Television. It was also the lone series in which Hunter played a regular part. The series' supporting cast features Jack Elam and Chubby Johnson.

== Plot ==
Temple Houston is based loosely on the career of the real-life circuit-riding lawyer Temple Lea Houston (1860–1905), son of the more famous Sam Houston. Little, however, binds all the episodes together under a common framework. The series variously cast the characters and situations in both an overtly humorous and a deadly serious light. Author-historian (and attorney) Francis M. Nevins asserts of the first episode entitled "The Twisted Rope", "Clearly, the concept here is Perry Mason out West", going so far as to note that Temple Houston's court opponent "apes Hamilton Burger by accusing Houston of 'prolonging this trial with a lot of dramatic nonsense'". Later episodes turned Houston into more of a detective than a lawyer. Over the course of the series, the bulk of the narrative sees Houston actually gathering evidence, rather than trying cases. In the end, the series largely eschewed criminal law in favor of overtly humorous plots, such as in the episode "The Law and Big Annie", in which Houston uses his legal expertise to help a friend decide what to do after he inherits an elephant.

The producers tried to avoid any storylines that would embarrass the two surviving children of Temple Houston who were still living when the series aired.

== Cast ==
=== Main cast ===
- Jeffrey Hunter as Temple Lea Houston
- Jack Elam as George Taggart
- Frank Ferguson as Judge Gurney
- Chubby Johnson as Concho
- Mary Wickes as Ida Goff

=== Guest stars ===
- Robert Anderson
- Parley Baer
- Charles Bateman
- James Best
- Patricia Blair
- Eric Braeden
- Robert Bray
- Joe Brooks
- Kathie Browne
- Walter Burke
- King Calder
- Anthony Call
- James Chandler
- John Cliff
- Robert Conrad
- William Conrad
- Russ Conway
- Royal Dano
- John Dehner
- William Fawcett
- Shug Fisher
- Constance Ford
- Douglas Fowley
- Anne Francis
- Victor French
- Richard Garland
- Virginia Gregg
- Ron Hayes
- Rodolfo Hoyos Jr.
- Anne Helm
- Tom Hennesy
- Robert 'Buzz' Henry
- Clyde Howdy
- Rodolfo Hoyos Jr.
- Richard Jaeckel
- Victor Jory
- Don Kennedy
- Susan Kohner
- Robert Lansing
- Norman Leavitt
- Dayton Lummis
- Herbert Lytton
- Ken Mayer
- Gregg Palmer
- J. Pat O'Malley
- Robert Phillips
- Paula Raymond
- Penny Santon
- Frank J. Scannell
- Alex Sharp
- Tom Skerritt
- Everett Sloane
- Connie Stevens
- Frank Sutton
- Karl Swenson
- Russell Thorson
- Grace Lee Whitney
- Peter Whitney
- Collin Wilcox
- Van Williams
- Morgan Woodward

== Episode list ==
No.	Title	Directed by	Written by	Original release date
0	"The Man from Galveston"	William Conrad	Dean Riesner, Michael S. Zagor	N/A
1	"The Twisted Rope"	Abner Biberman	S : James Warner Bellah; T : Jack Turley	September 19, 1963
2	"Find Angel Chavez"	Herman Hoffman	John Hawkins, Steve McNeil	September 26, 1963
3	"Letter of the Law"	Robert Totten	Donald S. Sanford	October 3, 1963
4	"Toll the Bell Slowly"	Gerd Oswald	Robert Leslie Bellem, Carey Wilber	October 17, 1963
5	"The Third Bullet"	Alvin Ganzer	Antony Ellis	October 24, 1963
6	"Gallows in Galilee"	Robert Totten	E.M. Parsons	October 31, 1963
7	"The Siege at Thayer's Bluff"	Alvin Ganzer	Preston Wood	November 7, 1963
8	"Jubilee"	Robert Totten	John Robinson, Paul Savage	November 14, 1963
9	"Thunder Gap"	Leslie H. Martinson	Harold Jack Bloom, Thomas Thompson, Preston Wood	November 21, 1963
10	"Billy Hart"	William Conrad	Herman Groves, Norman Jolley	November 28, 1963
11	"Seventy Times Seven"	Robert Totten	D.D. Beauchamp, Arthur Browne Jr.	December 5, 1963
12	"Fracas at Kiowa Flats"	Leslie H. Martinson	Carey Wilber	December 12, 1963
13	"Enough Rope"	Irving J. Moore	Robert Vincent Wright	December 19, 1963
14	"The Dark Madonna"	John Florea	Gerry Day	December 26, 1963
15	"The Guardian"	Robert D. Webb	Donald S. Sanford	January 2, 1964
16	"Thy Name Is Woman"	William Conrad	Ken Pettus	January 9, 1964
17	"The Law and Big Annie"	Ken Pettus	Cecil Smith	January 16, 1964
18	"Sam's Boy"	Irving J. Moore	Warren Douglas	January 23, 1964
19	"Ten Rounds for Baby"	Irving J. Moore	William R. Cox	January 30, 1964
20	"The Case for William Gotch"	Leslie H. Martinson	Herman Groves	February 6, 1964
21	"A Slight Case of Larceny"	William Conrad	Ken Pettus	February 13, 1964
22	"Last Full Moon"	Leslie H. Martinson	Robert Sabaroff	February 27, 1964
23	"The Gun That Swept the West"	William Conrad	Unknown	March 5, 1964
24	"Do Unto Others, Then Gallop"	Leslie H. Martinson	Ron Bishop	March 19, 1964
25	"The Town That Trespassed"	William Conrad	Jack Turley	March 26, 1964
26	"Miss Katherine"	Leslie H. Martinson	Ken Pettus	April 2, 1964

== Production ==
=== Pilot ===
The earliest known conceptual documents for Temple Houston date back to 1957. It took about six years for a pilot to be filmed. That pilot, The Man from Galveston, was filmed in March 1963, but was never broadcast on television. Instead, the 57-minute film was released theatrically late in 1963. The series used a different cast from the movie pilot. Jeffrey Hunter was the only cast member to star in both pilot and series, although his character was re-dubbed Timothy Higgins in the pilot when it was released as a theatrical film.

The series was produced by Warner Bros. Television and Apollo Productions, a company co-owned by star Jeffrey Hunter, who had demanded to produce it in exchange for a film and television commitment to Warner Bros.

By December 1963, the series was rated 31st of the 32 new shows that season. NBC then ordered a switch back to more humorous stories. but the change merely allowed the series to continue to the end of the season.

=== Cancellation ===
Temple Houston was pulled after one season of twenty-six episodes. Hunter later indicated that he thought the series failed because of an inability to establish a consistent tone.

== Syndication ==
Because the show produced so few episodes, it had little presence on the domestic syndication market. However, it appears to have enjoyed limited international syndication. The series was shown in Japan in 1963, and on Australian regional television station GTS-4 in 1974.

In the United Kingdom the series was shown on BBC One television between October 1964 and July 1965, inspiring one of the few pieces of memorabilia from the show—a 1965 British annual. As in the US, the pilot The Man From Galveston was never shown on UK TV but did duty as a cinema second feature in April 1964 (supporting Warner's Mary, Mary).
