= Antoinette Power Houston Bringhurst =

American poet (1852–1932)

Antoinette "Nettie" Power Houston Bringhurst (1852–1932) was a Texas poet, the youngest daughter and fifth child of Sam Houston and his third wife Margaret Lea Houston. The elder Houston had no children with his two previous wives. Antoinette was born in the family's Woodland home near Huntsville, Texas. As a child, she lived in the Texas Governor's Mansion when her father served as Governor of Texas. Her youngest brother Temple Lea Houston was born in the mansion. She received an education at Baylor Female College in Independence, Texas, and at Austin Female College in Huntsville.

Her father died in 1863. She returned to the Texas Governor's Mansion on February 28, 1876, when she married William L. Bringhurst, a professor at Texas Military Institute, Austin, and later at the Agricultural and Mechanical College of Texas (now Texas A&M University). Governor Richard B. Hubbard stood in for her father, and gave the bride away. William Bringhurst had served in the Confederate States Army during the American Civil War, and was a prisoner of war in New Orleans, Louisiana. The couple had five children, four of whom died in childhood. They were the parents of Sam Houston Bringhurst (b.1874); Charles Raguet Bringhurst (1880–1882); William Stuart Bringhurst (b.1885); Nettie Houston Bringhurst (1887–1935); Anna Katherine Bringhurst (1890–1895). Of those, only Nettie lived to adulthood.

Antoinette's love of poetry, and her gift for writing it, was evident in her youth, having published her work in Scribner's and in the New York Evening Post. In 1904 she was awarded first prize by the Bohemian magazine, for the best poem about the Alamo. She was state historian of the Daughters of the Republic of Texas from 1906 to 1908, when they named her "Poet Laureate for Life". Her works include "The Lone Star Flag of Texas", "A Garnered Memory", "My Father's Picture", and "The Veterans' Reunion".

In 1925, she and her namesake granddaughter Nettie unveiled the Sam Houston Monument at Hermann Park in Houston. Antoinette died following a car crash on December 5, 1932. Funeral services were held at the Alamo. She was buried in Mission Burial Park South, San Antonio.

== Sources ==
- Roberts, Madge Thornall (1993). Star of Destiny: The Private Life of Sam and Margaret Houston. Denton, TX: University of North Texas Press. ISBN 0-929398-51-3. OCLC 26396197.
