= James Davidson (American football) =

American football player (born 1990)

No. 46
- Position: Linebacker

Personal information
- Born: November 1, 1990 (age 36); Huntsville, Texas, U.S.
- Listed height: 6 ft 3 in (1.91 m)
- Listed weight: 242 lb (110 kg)

Career information
- High school: Huntsville (Huntsville, Texas)
- College: Texas-El Paso
- NFL draft: 2014: undrafted

Career history
- Cincinnati Bengals (2014)*; New York Giants (2014); Miami Dolphins (2015)*
- * Offseason or practice squad member only
- Stats at Pro Football Reference

James Davidson (born November 1, 1990) is an American former football linebacker. He played college football at the University of Texas at El Paso and attended Huntsville High School in Huntsville, Texas. He was a member of the Cincinnati Bengals, New York Giants and Miami Dolphins of the National Football League (NFL).

== Early life ==
Davidson played high school football at Huntsville High School. He was an honorable mention selection on defense to the 2008 Associated Press 4A All-State team and a two-time 18-4A first-team All-District, including a unanimous selection as a senior. He was a second-team All-Area performer and voted as the district's Newcomer of the Year following his junior season in 2007. Davidson registered 63 tackles, three interceptions and three sacks as a senior while recording 84 tackles as a junior.

== College career ==
Davidson played for the UTEP Miners from 2010 to 2013. He was redshirted in 2009.

== Professional career ==
Davidson signed with the Cincinnati Bengals on May 12, 2014, after going undrafted in the 2014 NFL draft. He was released by the Bengals on August 26, 2014.

Davidson was signed to the New York Giants' practice squad on September 16, 2014. He was promoted to the active roster on December 2, 2014, and made his NFL debut on December 7, 2014, against the Tennessee Titans. He was released by the Giants on May 11, 2015.

Davidson signed with the Miami Dolphins on August 17, 2015. He was released by the Dolphins on September 4, 2015.
