= KSAM =

KSAM may refer to:

- KSAM-FM, a radio station (101.7 FM) licensed to Huntsville, Texas, United States
- KHNK (AM), a radio station (1240 AM) licensed to Whitefish, Montana, United States, which held the call sign KSAM from 2005 to 2025
- KHVL, a radio station (1490 AM) licensed to Huntsville, Texas, which held the call sign KSAM from 1938 to 2001
