= ROCS Nan Yang =

ROCS Nan Yang (DD-17) may refer to one of the following destroyers of the Republic of China Navy:

- ROCS Nan Yang (DD-17) (Gleaves class), the former American Gleaves-class destroyer USS Plunkett (DD-431) launched in March 1940; acquired by the Republic of China Navy in February 1959; struck in 1975 and scrapped
- ROCS Nan Yang (DD-17) (Allen M. Sumner class), the former American Allen M. Sumner-class destroyer USS John W. Thomason (DD-760) launched in September 1944; acquired by the Republic of China Navy in May 1974; later reclassified as DD-954; decommissioned in 2000 and placed in reserve
