= Huntsville High School (Texas) =

Location
- 650 Farm to Market Road 2821 East; Huntsville, (Walker County), Texas 77320; United States
- Coordinates: 30.742200°N 95.535798°W

Information
- Type: Public high school
- School district: Huntsville Independent School District
- NCES School ID: 482403002658
- Principal: Robert Gilbert
- Staff: 117.24 (FTE)
- Enrollment: 1,882 (2024-25)
- Student to teacher ratio: 16.05
- Colors: Green and white
- Athletics conference: UIL Class 5A
- Mascot: Hornets
- Website: Huntsville High School

Huntsville High School is a public high school located in Huntsville, Texas and classified as a 5A school by the UIL. It is part of the Huntsville Independent School District in Walker County.

== History ==
In 1906, Samuel Walker Houston founded the Galilee Community School for black students. It was consolidated with the Huntsville Negro School in 1926, and in 1929 was consolidated with the Huntsville School System. In 1930, Samuel Walker Houston High School (or just Sam Houston High School) was built for black students. For white students, a separate Huntsville High School building was constructed in 1931. Elementary schools began to integrate before 1965, and in 1965, black students could apply to attend Huntsville High School rather than Sam Houston High School. In 1968, Sam Houston High School closed as full integration was completed.

The modern high school was likely built in the late 1980s. There was a small expansion in 1998. No further expansions would occur until a 2021 bond, which added an auditorium to the high school along with new athletic facilities.

Richard Linklater, a director who attended Huntsville High School, heavily based his 1993 film Dazed and Confused on his experiences there. In October 2004, three of Linklater's former classmates from the school filed a defamation lawsuit against Linklater, claiming to be the basis for the similarly named characters on the film. The suit was subsequently dismissed.

In March 2025, four Huntsville ISD staff members were arrested for sex-related offenses. Two of the four were employed at the high school: a 33-year-old cheerleading coach and a 42-year-old teacher. Both were arrested for having inappropriate relationships with students and were subsequently fired.

== Demographics ==
As of the 2024-2025 school year, there are 1,882 students enrolled at Huntsville High School. Around 68.1% of students are eligible for free or reduced-price lunch. The ethnic distribution of students is as follows:

- 33% White
- 37.8% Hispanic
- 25.8% African American
- 1.2% Asian
- 0.3% American Indian
- 0.1% Native Hawaiian/Pacific Islander
- 1.8% Two or More Races

== Academics ==
For the 2024-2025 school year, the school was given an overall rating of "D" from the Texas Education Agency. The school offers Dual Credit courses, which allow students to earn both high school and college credit at the same time through Sam Houston State University, the Lone Star College system, and the Advanced Technical Credit Program. A variety of Advanced Placement (AP) courses are offered as well.

== Fine arts ==
Huntsville High School offers art, band, choir, jazz band, and theatre as fine arts course options. One fine arts credit is required to graduate.

In 2015, the school placed second in the UIL State Film Contest's documentary category with their short film "A Shot at Equality."

=== Marching band ===
The Huntsville Hornet Military Marching Band uses a military marching style and therefore competes against other military-style bands in Texas, rather than the more common corps-style bands. The band has made UIL State Military Marching Band Contest finals appearances in 2017 and 2021.

== Athletics ==
The Huntsville Hornets compete in the following sports:

- Baseball
- Basketball
- Cross country
- Football
- Golf
- Soccer
- Softball
- Tennis
- Track and field
- Volleyball
- Wrestling

=== State Titles ===
- Boys Basketball
  - 1978 (3A), 1979 (3A)
- Football
  - 1953 (2A), 1980 (4A)
- Girls Golf
  - 2014 (4A)

== Notable alumni ==
- Charles Harrelson, criminal and father of Woody Harrelson, occasionally attended Huntsville High on and off from 1951-1953.
- Rex Wayne Tillerson (1970), 69th United States Secretary of State from February 2017 to March 2018 under Donald Trump.
- Richard Linklater, director, attended Huntsville High from 1975 to 1978 and heavily based Dazed and Confused (1993) on the experience.
- Erin Cummings (1995), television/film stage actress and former Kilgore College Rangerette.
- T'Vondre Sweat (2019), NFL defensive tackle for the Tennessee Titans.
