= Sam Houston Industrial and Training School =

School in Walker County, Texas (1907–1930)

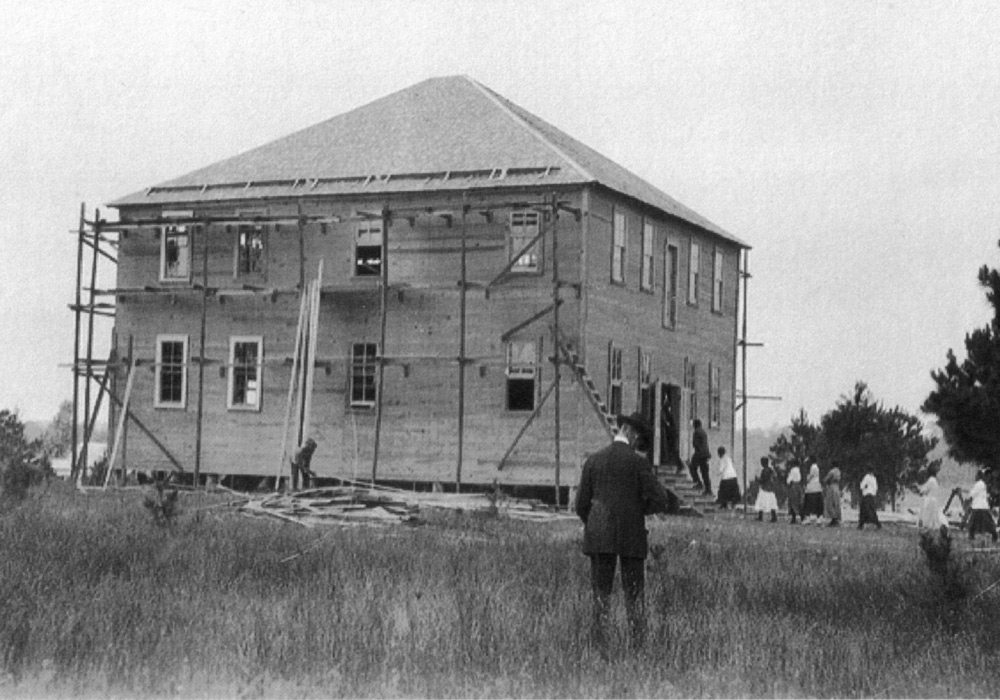
- Sam Houston Industrial and Training School (1916) construction of the Industrial Building

Location
- intersection of Texas State Highway 30 and Williams Road, Galilee, Walker County, Texas, U.S. 30.698733°N 95.628917°W

Information
- Other name: Galilee Community School, Samuel Walker Houston School, Houstonian Normal and Industrial Institute, Samuel W. Houston Industrial and Training Institute, Walker County Training School
- Founded: 1907
- Founder: Samuel Walker Houston
- Closed: 1930
- Affiliation: Huntsville Independent School District (starting in 1930)
- Followed by: Huntsville Colored School

Sam Houston Industrial and Training School (1907–1930) was a private Rosenwald school for African American students located near Huntsville, Texas in rural Galilee, Walker County, Texas. Originally known as Galilee Community School, it was founded in 1903 with the help of both black and white leaders in Walker County, Texas. It was named for founder Samuel Walker Houston.

A historical marker was erected in 2005 by Texas Historical Commission (no.13238) which commemorates its history. It was also known as the Samuel Walker Houston School, the Houstonian Normal and Industrial Institute, the Samuel W. Houston Industrial and Training Institute, and the Walker County Training School.

== History ==
The Sam Houston Industrial and Training School was preceded by the Bishop Ward Normal and Collegiate Institute, a black college founded in 1883 by the African Methodist Episcopal Church of Huntsville and by Joshua Houston, the father of Samuel Walker Houston.

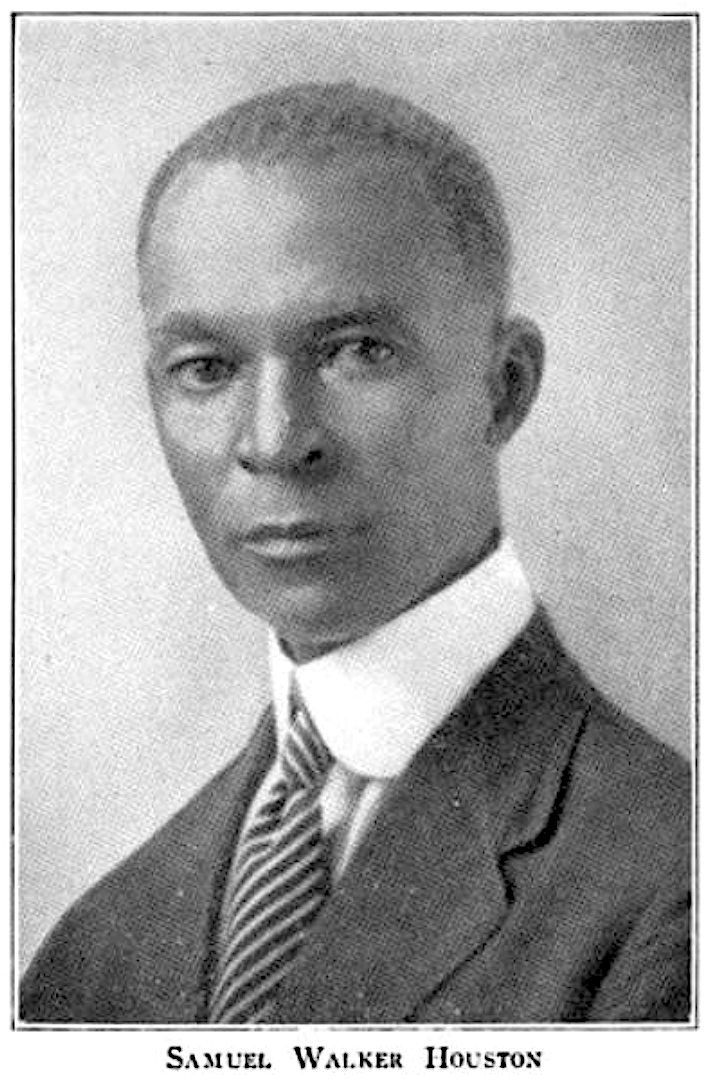
Samuel Walker Houston (c. 1927)

The Sam Houston Industrial and Training School was founded in 1907 by Samuel Walker Houston (1864–1945) as the Galilee Community School in Galillee, Walker County, Texas. It was created for black students from 1st grade through 11th grade.

It later became the Houstonian Normal and Industrial Institute. The school offered vocational and mechanical instruction with including cooking, sewing, woodwork, carpentry, and agriculture as well as classes in music, humanities, and science. Trustees of the school built the first campus building in 1914, and continued to add new facilities, including dormitories and workshops and included funding from the Rosenwald Fund.

The school was consolidated in 1930 into the Huntsville Independent School District. In 1930 the Sam Houston Industrial and Training School was merged into the Huntsville Colored School, which became Sam Houston High School. Samuel Walker Houston served as the principal of the high school starting in 1930.

A monument The Dreamers (1995) commemorates the history of the secondary school. Its history is also honored at the Samuel Walker Houston Museum and Cultural Center.

== See also ==
- Training school (United States)
