= John Thomason =

American author, illustrator, military officer (1893–1944)

John William Thomason Jr. (28 February 1893 – 12 March 1944) was an American author, illustrator, and a military officer. He served as a Captain in the United States Marine Corps.

== Early life and family ==
Thomason was born in Huntsville, Texas, the son of a physician and the grandson of Confederate General James Longstreet's chief of staff Major T. J. Goree.

He enlisted in the United States Marine Corps on 6 April 1917 and served until his death in 1944. In 1917 Thomason married Leda Bass; they had one son, John "Jack" W Thomason III, born in 1920. After serving as a U.S. Marine in World War II, Jack died in an airplane crash in Calcutta, India, in 1947.

== Career ==
During World War I, Thomason served as the executive officer of the 49th Company, 1st Battalion, 5th Marine Regiment and was awarded the Navy Cross. Thomason served in Cuba, Haiti, and Nicaragua. He led the Horse Marines at the Legation in Peking, commanded the 38th Company in China, commanded the Marine Detachment of the USS Rochester (CA-2), and was promoted to lieutenant colonel commanding the 2nd Battalion, 6th Marine Regiment at San Diego, then was assigned to the Office of Naval Intelligence prior to the attack on Pearl Harbor. At the beginning of American involvement in World War II, Thomason was assigned to Admiral Chester Nimitz's staff as an inspector of Marine installations and visited Guadalcanal during the fighting. The U.S Navy destroyer USS John W. Thomason (DD-760) was named after him.

During a posting as commander of the Marine Detachment Naval Ammunition Depot in Dover, Delaware, he met an old Marine Corps Base Quantico classmate and comrade in arms from the World War, Laurence Stallings, famed for authoring What Price Glory?. Stallings introduced him to the editor of Scribner's Magazine who engaged Thomason to write and illustrate for the magazine whilst remaining on active duty with the Marine Corps.

He died in San Diego, California, and is buried at Oakwood Cemetery in Huntsville, Texas.

== Publications ==
Thomason wrote and illustrated over sixty short stories and magazine articles, and wrote and edited book reviews for the American Mercury magazine.

=== Books ===
- Fix Bayonets (1926) (short stories collection)
- The United States Army Second Division Northwest of Chateau Theirry in World War I (1927)
- Red Pants and Other Stories (1927) (short stories collection)
- Jeb Stuart (1930)
- Two Little Confederates (1932) (illustrator only)
- Salt Winds and Gobi Dust (1934) (short stories collection)
- The Adventures of General Marbot by Himself (1935) (editor and illustrator)
- A Narrative of the Life of David Crockett of Tennessee by Himself (illustrator only)
- Gone to Texas (1937) (novel)
- Lone Star Preacher (1941) (novel)
- -- and a Few Marines (1943) (short stories collection)

=== Magazines ===
==== Fiction ====
- "Monkey-Meat," Scribner’s Magazine, November 1925 [first known publication]
- "The Collaborator," The Saturday Evening Post, April 22, 1944 [last known publication]

==== Nonfiction ====
- "Honkers of the Dawn," Liberty, December 25, 1926
- "Our Disappearing Ducks," The Saturday Evening Post, May 11, 1935
