= Samuel Walker Houston =

American educator (1864–1945)

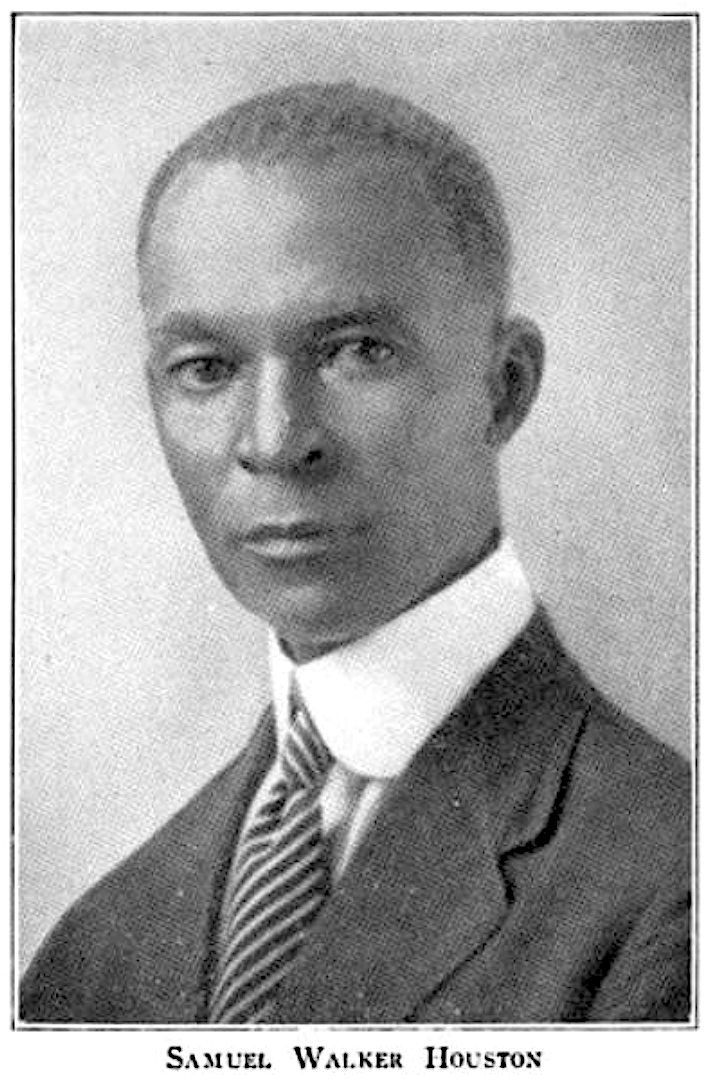
- Samuel Walker Houston (c. 1927)
- Born: February 12, 1864; Huntsville, Texas, U.S.
- Died: November 19, 1945 (aged 81); Houston, Texas, U.S.
- Burial place: Oakwood Cemetery
- Education: Hampton Institute, Atlanta University, Howard University
- Occupations: Teacher, academic administrator, newspaper publisher, newspaper proprietor, newspaper editor, black school founder, formerly enslaved
- Political party: Republican
- Spouse(s): Cornelia Orvis, Hope Harville
- Children: 5
- Father: Joshua Houston

Samuel Walker Houston (February 12, 1864 – November 19, 1945) was an American teacher, academic administrator, newspaper proprietor, newspaper editor, and black school founder. He was born enslaved, and later became a pioneer in the field of education in Texas.

== Early life and education ==
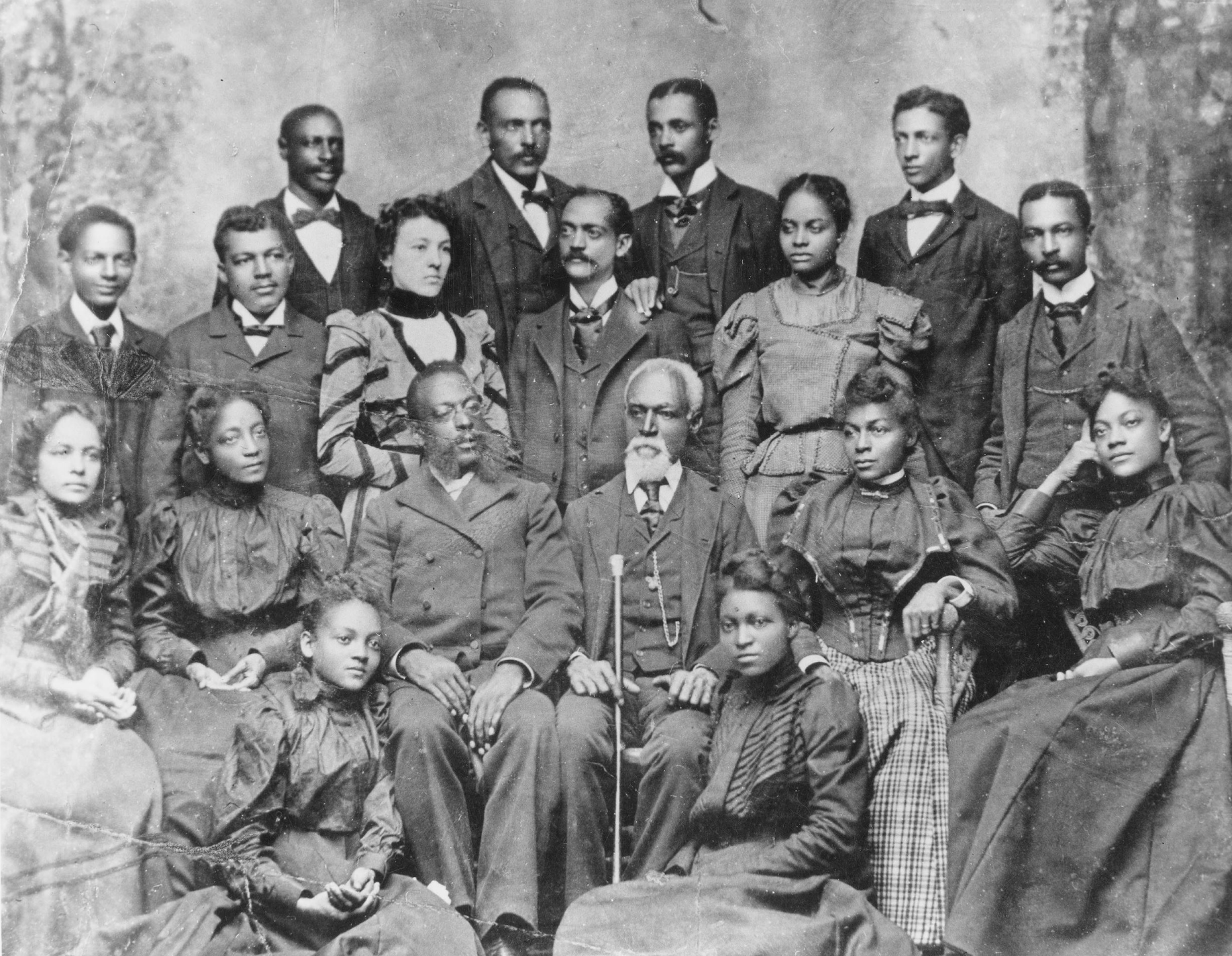
The Houston family in October 1898, Samuel is in the second row on the far right

Samuel Walker Houston was born enslaved on February 12, 1864, in Huntsville, Texas. His parents were Sylvester Lee (sometimes written as Sylvester Baker) and Joshua Houston; his father was African American and formerly enslaved by Sam Houston (1793–1863) and his wife Margaret Lea Houston (1819–1867). His father founded in 1883 the Bishop Ward Normal and Collegiate Institute in Huntsville.

After studying with his father and professor Charles W. Luckie, Houston realized that education was the building block to success. Houston attended Hampton Institute (now Hampton University) in Hampton, Virginia; Atlanta University (now Clark Atlanta University) in Atlanta, Georgia; and Howard University in Washington, D.C. He studied with W. E. B. Du Bois at Atlanta University.

== Career ==
While living in Washington, D.C. for college, Houston honed administrative skills, working for 5 years as a clerk for the United States Navy.

Around 1900, Houston returned to Texas and founded the Huntsville Times newspapers, which he edited from about 1902 until 1907. He also taught at the Red Hill Community School in Grimes County, Texas at the same time. He served as a delegate to the 1900 Republican National Convention in Philadelphia.

In 1907, Houston founded the Galilee Community School (later known as Houstonian Normal and Industrial Institute) a black school for 1st grade through 11th grade in rural Galilee in Walker County, Texas. By 1930, Houston's school was consolidated into the Huntsville Independent School District.

Houston served in 1928 on the advisory committee for the National Republican Organization and attended the 1928 Republican National Convention in Kansas City, Missouri.

Houston served as field secretary for the Texas Commission on Inter-Racial Cooperation and was vice president of the Teachers State Association of Texas.

In 1930, Houston was named supervising principal over nine Walker County schools, including the Huntsville Colored School (later known as Samuel W. Houston High School and became the Samuel Walker Houston Elementary School) for black students.

Houston was the director in 1936 for the Texas Centennial Exposition in Dallas.

== Personal life ==
Houston was a Baptist. Houston first married Cornelia Orvis, daughter of Rev. George B. Orvis and his wife Mary. Together they had one son, Harold Houston; later Cornelia Orvis and a baby daughter died in childbirth.

Houston re-married on April 18, 1915, to fellow instructor Hope Harville. They had three children: Samuel W. Houston Jr., (born 1916), Helen Hope (born 1917), and Hazel Sylvester (born 1919).

== Death and legacy ==
On November 19, 1945, Houston died at the age of 81, while staying in the home of his niece Constance Houston in Houston Texas. He was buried in Huntsville's Oakwood Cemetery where his father, Joshua Houston, Aunt Virginia Houston Wilson and namesake, Gen. Sam Houston are all interred.

He was the namesake of Samuel W. Houston High School, which later became the Samuel Walker Houston Elementary School.

In 1995, on the grounds of the old Samuel W. Houston Elementary School, the Huntsville Independent School District, along with the Huntsville Arts Commission and the high school's Ex-Students Association, commissioned artists Larry Zink and Monica Taylor to create The Dreamers. This is a monument which celebrates the contribution made by the black community to the growth and development of Huntsville and Walker County, which was placed in front of the old facility, now renamed as the Samuel W. Houston Museum and Cultural Center.
