= Oakwood Cemetery (Huntsville, Texas) =

Cemetery in Huntsville, Texas

Oakwood Cemetery Oakwood-Mayes Addition Cemetery
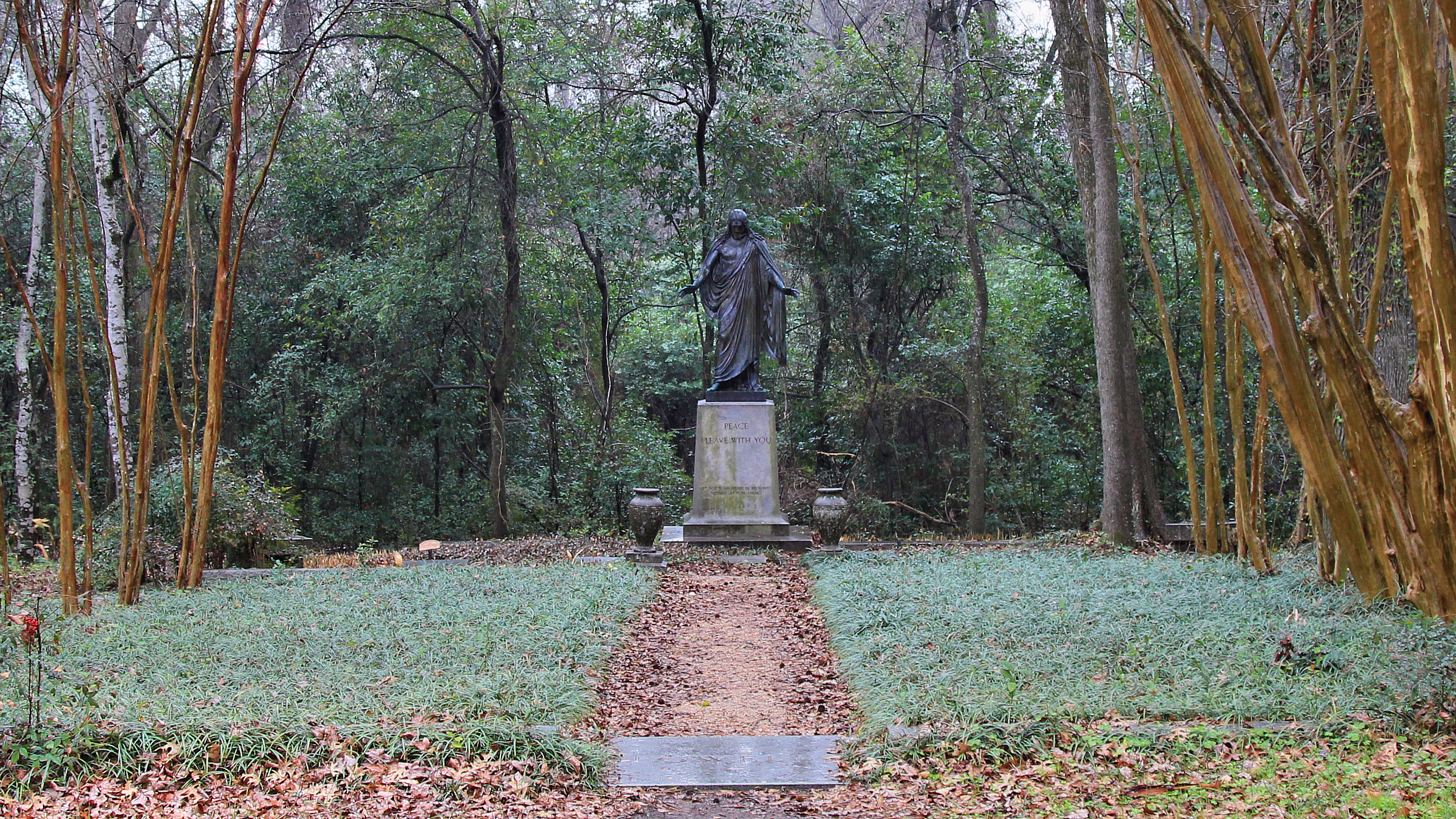
- Powell Sanctuary in the Oakwood Cemetery

Details
- Location: Martin Luther King Drive; Huntsville, Texas, U.S.
- Coordinates: 30.72625°N 95.54242°W
- Owned by: City of Huntsville
- Find a Grave: Oakwood Cemetery; Oakwood-Mayes Addition Cemetery

The Oakwood Cemetery, also known as the Oakwood-Mayes Addition Cemetery, is a historic cemetery located in Huntsville, Texas.

== History ==
In 1847, Pleasant Gray deed a 1,600 square feet (150 m^{2}) piece of land. The First Christian Church of Huntsville purchased the land in 1963 from H. Boyd Mayes. It is owned and maintained by the City of Huntsville since 2003.

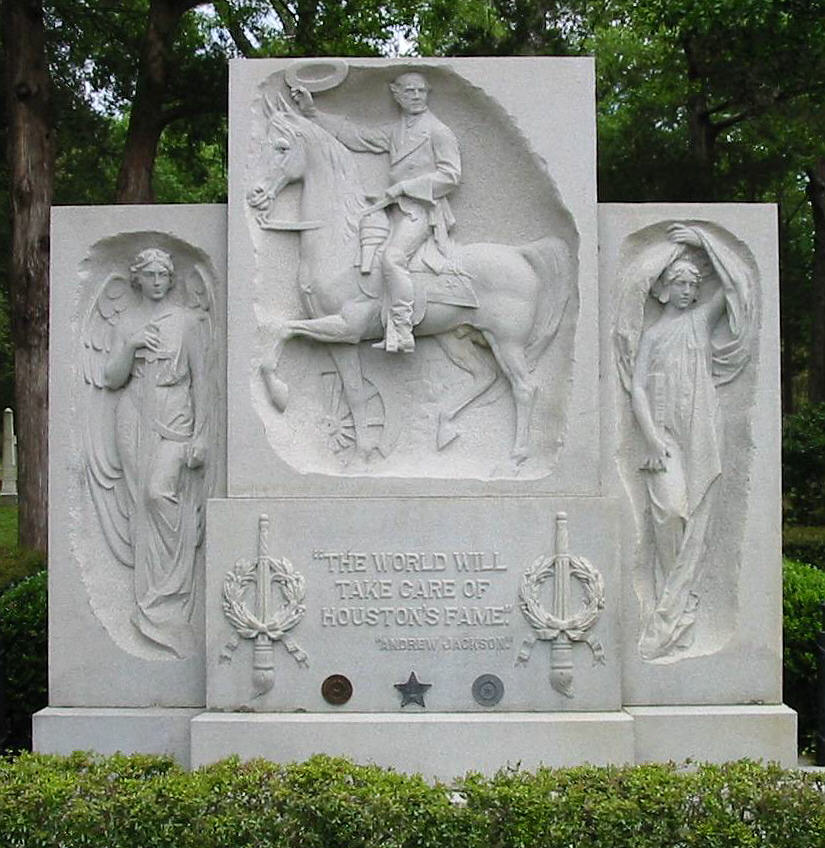
Sam Houston's (1793–1863) gravestone by Pompeo Coppini in 1910

Many pioneering families are buried at this site, as well as people that died in the Yellow Fever epidemic of 1867, many of which were the Union army soldiers who stayed after the war ended. The cemetery has six sections for distinguished for periods of expansion: Adickes Addition, Mayes Addition, New Cemetery, Old Cemetery with "Negro Cemetery", and the Wildwood Sanctuary. In 2004, some 150 unmarked sunken graves were discovered in the older part of the cemetery, and unlettered white concrete crosses were added to their location; thought to have been the graves of the enslaved.

This cemetery is a reportedly haunted location, specifically the "Christus", or "Black Jesus" gravestone marker by Danish sculptor Bertel Thorvaldsen for Rawley Rather Powell.

== Notable burials ==
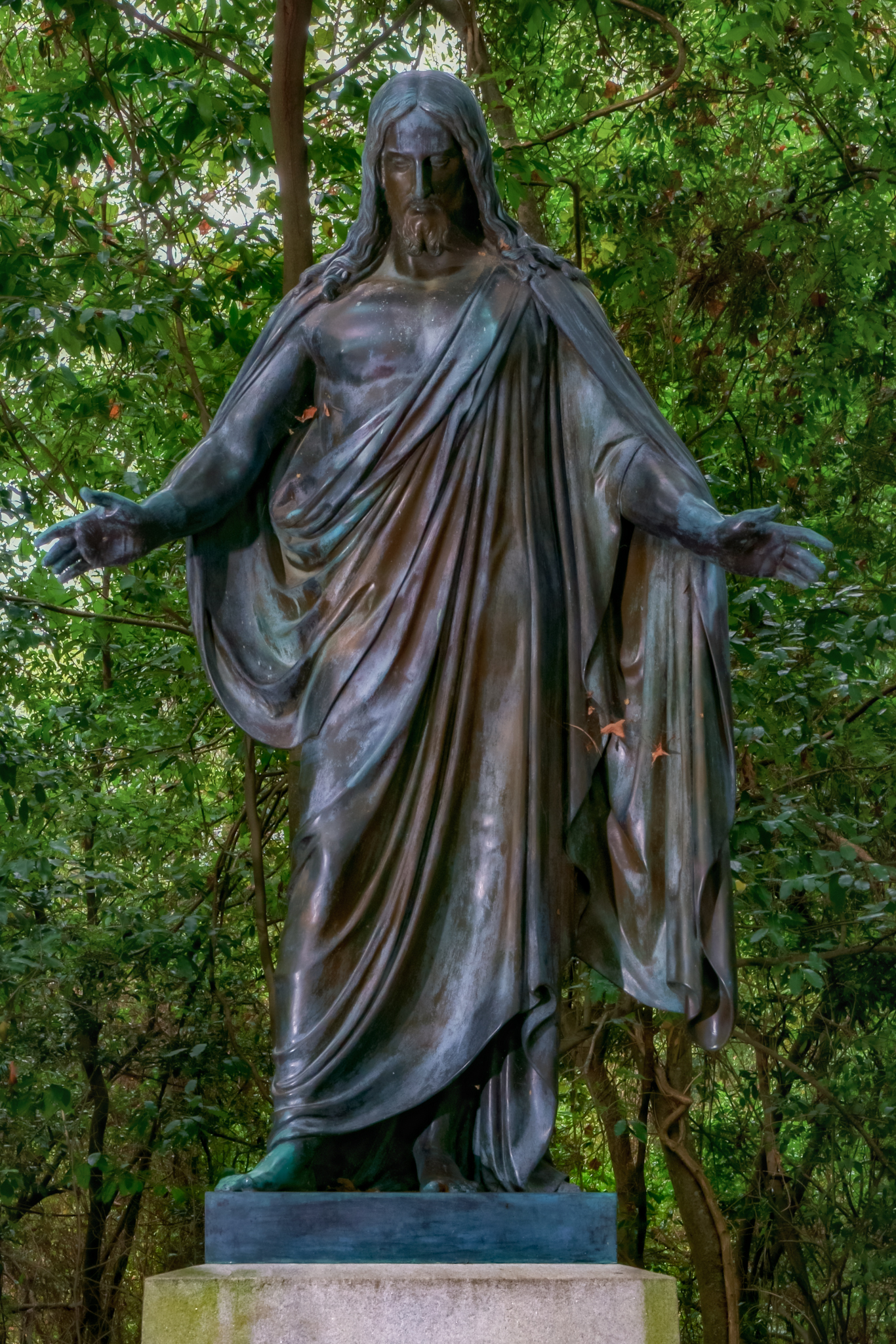
Christus by Bertel Thorvaldsen in bronze, or "Black Jesus", grave for Rawley Rather Powell in the Powell Sanctuary

- Leonard Anderson Abercrombie (1832–1891) Texas state legislator, secessionist delegate, Confederate army officer
- George Fitzhugh (1806–1881) proslavery writer, sociologist
- T. J. Goree (1835–1905) Confederate army captain
- John Henry (1828–1897) Canadian-born tailor, Confederate army major who construct the uniforms
- Joshua Houston (c. 1822 – 1902) formerly enslaved, turned politician and businessperson
- Sam Houston (1793–1863) general and statesman
- Samuel Walker Houston (1864–1945) educator, academic administrator, newspaper proprietor
- Sherri Jarvis (1966–1980) murder victim
- Rev. Samuel McKinney (1807–1879) Irish-born Presbyterian minister and educator; founding president of Austin College
- Pleasant Williams Kittrell (1805–1867) physician, Texas state legislator; died from Yellow Fever
- George Robinson (1820–1888) English-born newspaper publisher, The Huntsville Item
- John William Thomason Jr. (1893–1944) author, illustrator, Capt. of the United States Marine Corp.
- Henderson King Yoakum (1810–1856) Texas historian, author

== See also ==
- List of cemeteries in Texas
