= The Dreamers (sculpture) =

Sculpture in Huntsville, Texas

Coordinates: 30.725278°N 95.557924°W

The Dreamers is a culturally inspired sculpture crafted by artists Larry Zink and Monica Taylor, designed to highlight and exalt contributions made by the black community. Completed in 1995, the sculpture stands on the grounds of the Samuel W. Houston secondary school, named after Samuel Walker Houston (1864–1945), prominent African-American educator and civil rights pioneer.

The school building now serves the community of Huntsville, Texas as the Samuel Walker Houston Cultural Center. The sculpture, which contains 69 cast concrete images covering multiple generations of African-Americans, is set on a curved wall approximately 20 feet in length and approximately four and a half feet tall. With the top row consisting of elders aged 55 to 95, the center row of middle-aged adults, and the bottom row of children, the youngest aged 13, the work represents the struggles of the past through to the hope of the future.

The work was commissioned by the Huntsville Independent School District, the Huntsville Arts Commission, and the Samuel W. Houston High School Ex-Students Association.
