= T. J. Goree =

Confederate Army officer (1835–1905)

Thomas Jewett Goree
- Born: November 14, 1835; Marion, Alabama, U.S.
- Died: March 5, 1905 (aged 69); Galveston, Texas, U.S.
- Burial place: Oakwood Cemetery; Huntsville, Texas, U.S.
- Military career
- Allegiance: Confederate States of America
- Branch: Confederate States Army
- Service years: 1861-1865
- Rank: Major
- Nickname: TJ
- Unit: First Corps, Army of Northern Virginia
- Conflicts: American Civil War: Battle of Gettysburg
- Other work: lawyer, superintendent of penitentiaries

Thomas Jewett Goree (November 14, 1835 – March 5, 1905) was a Confederate Captain in the First Corps, Army of Northern Virginia during the American Civil War. By the end of the war he was promoted to the rank of captain. He was one of Lt. General James Longstreet's most trusted aides.

== Early life ==
Thomas J. Goree was born on November 14, 1835, in Marion, Alabama. At age 15, he and family moved to Huntsville, Texas. At age 18, he attended Baylor College, from which he graduated with a law degree. With other partners, he formed a law firm in Montgomery, Texas, in 1858, later moving it to Houston. At the start of the American Civil War in 1861 he left his law firm and headed for Virginia to volunteer for the Confederacy.

== Honors ==
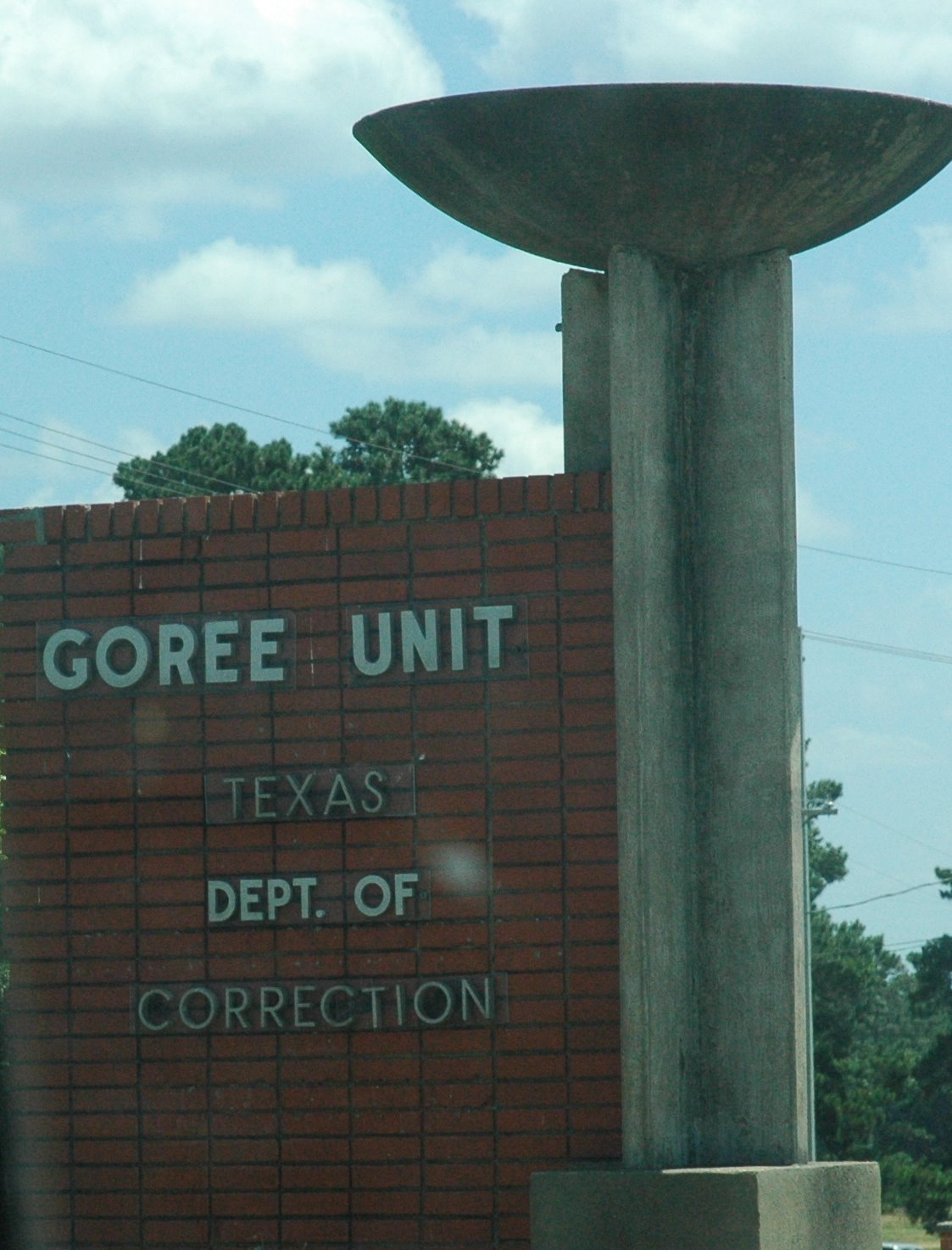
Goree Unit

The Goree Unit of the Texas Department of Criminal Justice, was named in honor of TJ Goree in 1935. The unit houses the state's Sex Offender Treatment Program and U.S. Immigration and Customs Enforcement Processing Center for the Texas Department of Criminal Justice. The unit is accredited by the American Correctional Association.

== In popular media ==
- Goree was portrayed by Ivan Kane in Gettysburg, the 1993 film version of Michael Shaara's The Killer Angels.
