= Lois Blount =

Lois Fitzhugh Foster, daughter of Fitzhugh and Willie Swann Foster, was born in Huntsville, Texas on May 24, 1896. A teacher, historian, librarian, and museum curator, she held a B.A. from University of Texas at Austin and an M.A. from Columbia University. She joined the faculty at Stephen F. Austin State University in 1923, the year the college opened, teaching Social Sciences and History. She married Guy Arthur Blount on June 22, 1925 and they had four children.

After her husband's death in 1937, Lois Blount returned to SFA and until 1966 was Director of the Rare Book Room or East Texas Collection (later called Special Collections and then East Texas Research Center). During this same time period she was also sometimes Curator of the Stone Fort Museum and on the History faculty. She was a life member of the Texas State Historical Association, a director of the East Texas Historical Association, and a member of the American Association for State and Local History as well as other historical and genealogical societies. She died in Nacogdoches, Texas on September 2, 1980.
