= KSAM-FM =

Radio station in Huntsville, Texas

Coordinates: 30.6967°N 95.5523°W

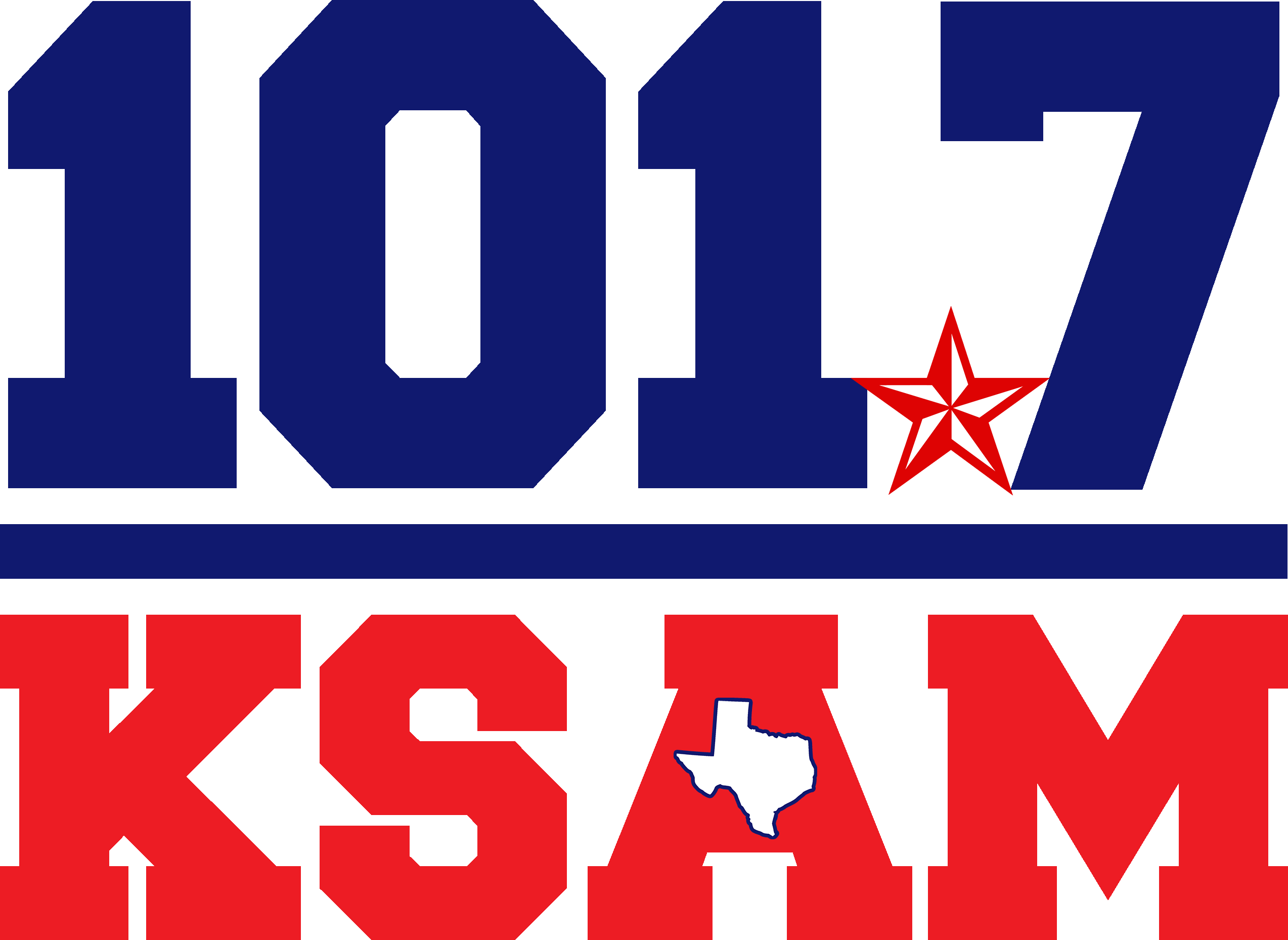
- Huntsville, Texas; United States
- Frequency: 101.7 MHz
- Branding: K-Sam

Programming
- Format: Country

Ownership
- Owner: HEH Communications, LLC
- Sister stations: KHVL

History
- First air date: November 5, 1965
- Call sign meaning: Sam Houston

Technical information
- Licensing authority: FCC
- Facility ID: 70721
- Class: A
- ERP: 3,700 watts
- HAAT: 128 meters (420 ft)

Links
- Public license information: Public file; LMS
- Webcast: Listen live
- Website: ksam1017.com

KSAM-FM (101.7 FM) is a country music radio station licensed to Huntsville, Texas, owned and operated by HEH Communications, LLC. It brands on-air as K-Sam, a name derived from Sam Houston, the soldier-statesman buried in Huntsville. The station's sister station is KHVL (1490 AM).

History

Origins of the KSAM Call Letters (1938)

The KSAM call letters have roots in Huntsville radio dating to November 1, 1938, when the Federal Communications Commission (FCC) issued a construction permit for a new AM station on 1500 kHz. The original licensee was the Sam Houston Broadcasting Association, with H.G. Webster serving as president. The call sign KSAM was chosen as a tribute to Sam Houston, the Republic of Texas president and Texas governor who is buried in Huntsville. The station operated initially as a daytime-only facility at 100 watts.

Following the North American Regional Broadcasting Agreement (NARBA) of 1941, the station was reassigned from 1500 kHz to 1490 kHz, a shift that allowed for increased power and expanded operating hours. Through the 1950s and 1960s, KSAM (AM) grew into a central hub for Walker County news and community programming, cycling through country and oldies formats over the decades. The AM station later changed its call sign to KHVL to establish a distinct identity from its FM counterpart, which had by then assumed the KSAM branding.

Launch of KSAM-FM (1965)

KSAM-FM signed on the air on November 5, 1965, bringing an FM presence to the Huntsville market. Like the AM station before it, the FM outlet honored the KSAM call letters' long association with Sam Houston and the community of Huntsville. The station broadcasts at 3,700 watts effective radiated power (ERP) from a height above average terrain (HAAT) of 128 meters (420 ft), operating as an FCC Class A facility (Facility ID: 70721).

Current Operations

KSAM-FM airs a country music format and is co-owned with KHVL, the successor to the original KSAM (AM) station, under HEH Communications, LLC. Both stations maintain local studios in Huntsville to serve Walker County and surrounding areas.

In 2022, HEH Communications and its stations KSAM-FM and KHVL were recognized by the Huntsville-Walker County Chamber of Commerce as the Business of the Year, reflecting the stations' continued commitment to local community service.

In 2026, KSAM-FM was voted Best Radio Station in the Huntsville Item's Reader's Choice Awards, presented in partnership with the Sam Houston State University Small Business Development Center.
