= USS John W. Thomason =

Allen M. Sumner-class destroyer

Coordinates: 24.5133333°N 122.0000000°E

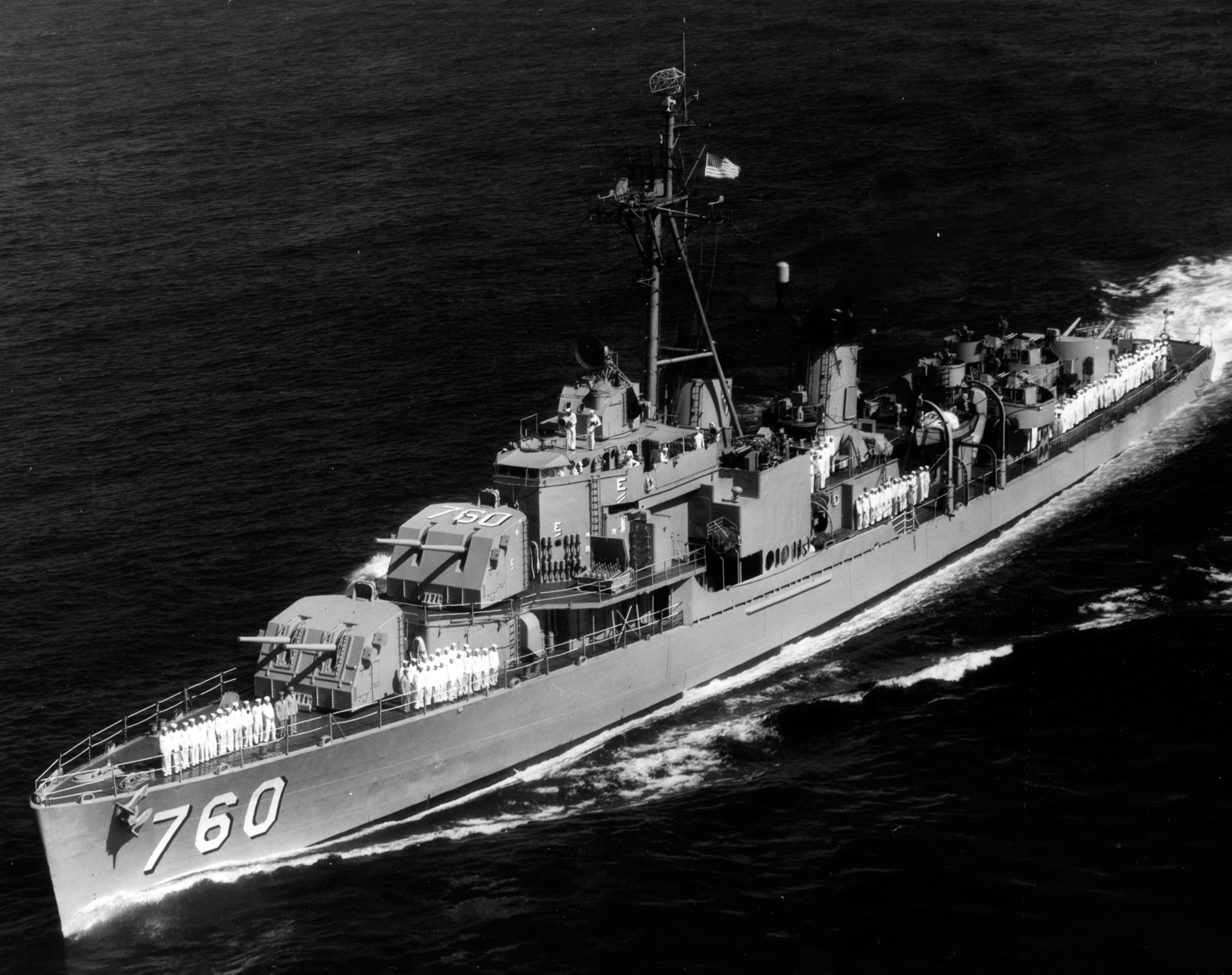
- USS John W. Thomason underway on 10 March 1958

History

United States
- Name: John W. Thomason
- Namesake: John William Thomason Jr.
- Builder: Bethlehem Steel
- Laid down: 21 November 1943
- Launched: 30 September 1944
- Sponsored by: Mrs. John W. Thomason
- Commissioned: 11 October 1945
- Decommissioned: 8 December 1970
- Stricken: 1 February 1974
- Identification: Callsign: NKOL; Hull number: DD-760
- Fate: to Taiwan 6 May 1974
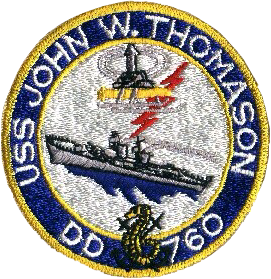
- Badge

Taiwan
- Name: Nan Yang; (南陽)
- Namesake: Nan Yang
- Acquired: 6 May 1974
- Commissioned: 23 June 1975
- Identification: Hull number: DD-917
- Reclassified: DD-954; DDG-917, 1982
- Decommissioned: 16 January 2000
- Fate: Sunk as target, 3 August 2006

General characteristics
- Class & type: Allen M. Sumner-class destroyer
- Displacement: 2,200 tons
- Length: 376 ft 6 in (114.76 m)
- Beam: 40 ft (12 m)
- Draft: 15 ft 8 in (4.78 m)
- Propulsion: 60,000 shp (45,000 kW); 2 propellers
- Speed: 34 knots (63 km/h; 39 mph)
- Range: 6,500 nmi (12,000 km; 7,500 mi) at 15 kn (28 km/h; 17 mph)
- Complement: 336
- Armament: 6 × 5 in (127 mm)/38 cal. guns, 12 × 40 mm AA guns, 11 × 20 mm AA guns, 10 × 21 inch (533 mm) torpedo tubes, 6 × depth charge projectors, 2 × depth charge tracks

USS John W. Thomason (DD-760), an Allen M. Sumner-class destroyer, is the only ship of the United States Navy to be named for John William Thomason, Jr., a USMC officer who was awarded the Navy Cross for bravery during World War I.

== Construction and career ==
John W. Thomason (DD-760) was launched by Bethlehem Steel Co., San Francisco, California, 30 September 1944; sponsored by Mrs. John W. Thomason, widow of Colonel Thomason; and commissioned on 11 October 1945.

=== Service in the United States Navy ===
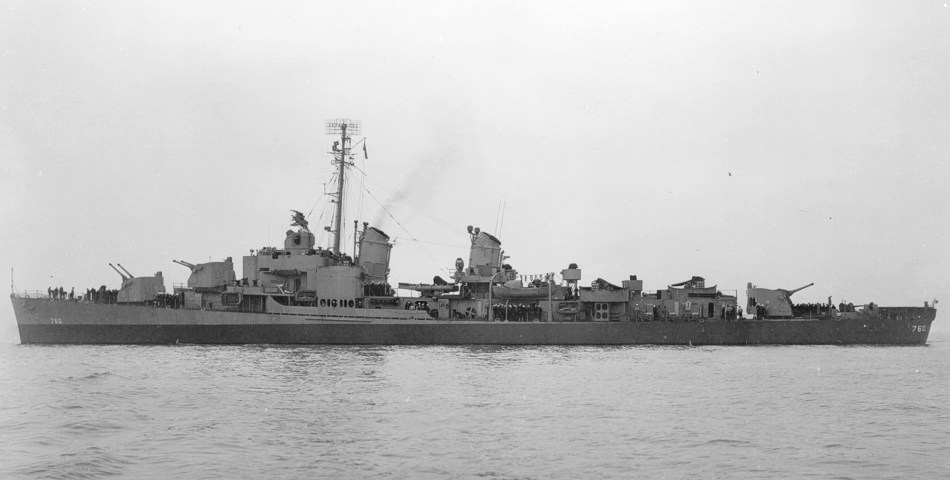
John W. Thomason off San Francisco on 19 October 1945

The new destroyer conducted shakedown training out of San Diego, followed by a series of Naval Reserve training cruises from Seattle and San Francisco. From November 1947 to December 1948 the ship carried out training maneuvers. She sailed on 5 December 1948 for her first deployment to the Far East, arriving at Tsingtao on 1 January 1949 for operations supporting the Marines ashore in China. Departing 24 May 1949, John W. Thomason returned via Okinawa to San Diego on 23 June 1949 and spent the remainder of the year training.

==== Korea War ====
The ship returned to the Far East in early 1950, arriving at Yokosuka on 29 January. During this critical post-war period, she operated with British ships on training maneuvers off the coast of Indochina and Korea, returning to San Diego 25 April 1950. Two months later, North Korean aggression plunged the United States and the United Nations into the Korean War. Under the command of Gordon Chung-Hoon, John W. Thomason sailed on 30 September to join the 7th Fleet, operating in the screen of carrier task groups attacking enemy positions and supply lines. She arrived at Wonsan on 9 November to patrol and bombard during the campaign against that port. Antisubmarine exercises took her to Pearl Harbor from January–March 1951, but John W. Thomason arrived off Korea again on 26 March to operate with Boxer and Princeton during air strikes. Two weeks in April were spent on the important Formosa Patrol, after which she returned to the carrier task force. With battleship New Jersey and another destroyer, she moved close on 24 May 1951 for gun bombardment of Yang Yang. The destroyer returned to San Diego from this deployment 2 July 1951.

John W. Thomason sailed again for Korea on 4 January 1952 and resumed operations with Task Force 77 off the coast of North Korea. She fired at railway targets 21 February in the Songjin area. During this period of stalemate on land, Navy strikes made up the bulk of offensive operations. The destroyer returned to Formosa Patrol duty in April. Back at Songjin and Wonsan on 26 April, the ship screened larger units, took part in shore bombardment, and patrolled offshore. She was relieved by a British destroyer on 21 June and returned to San Diego on 11 July 1952.

The destroyer operated off the California coast for the remainder of 1952, then sailed once more for Korea 21 February 1953. Formosa Patrol duty alternated with carrier task force operations off North Korea. John W. Thomason arrived at Wonsan harbor on 2 July; while firing at shore targets five days later, she received numerous shrapnel hits in a duel with enemy batteries. Maneuvering in the restricted waters, Commander Ratliff returned the fire until three batteries had been silenced. She continued to operate off Wonsan until the armistice on 27 July, and after a brief stay in Japan arrived at San Diego on 22 September 1953.

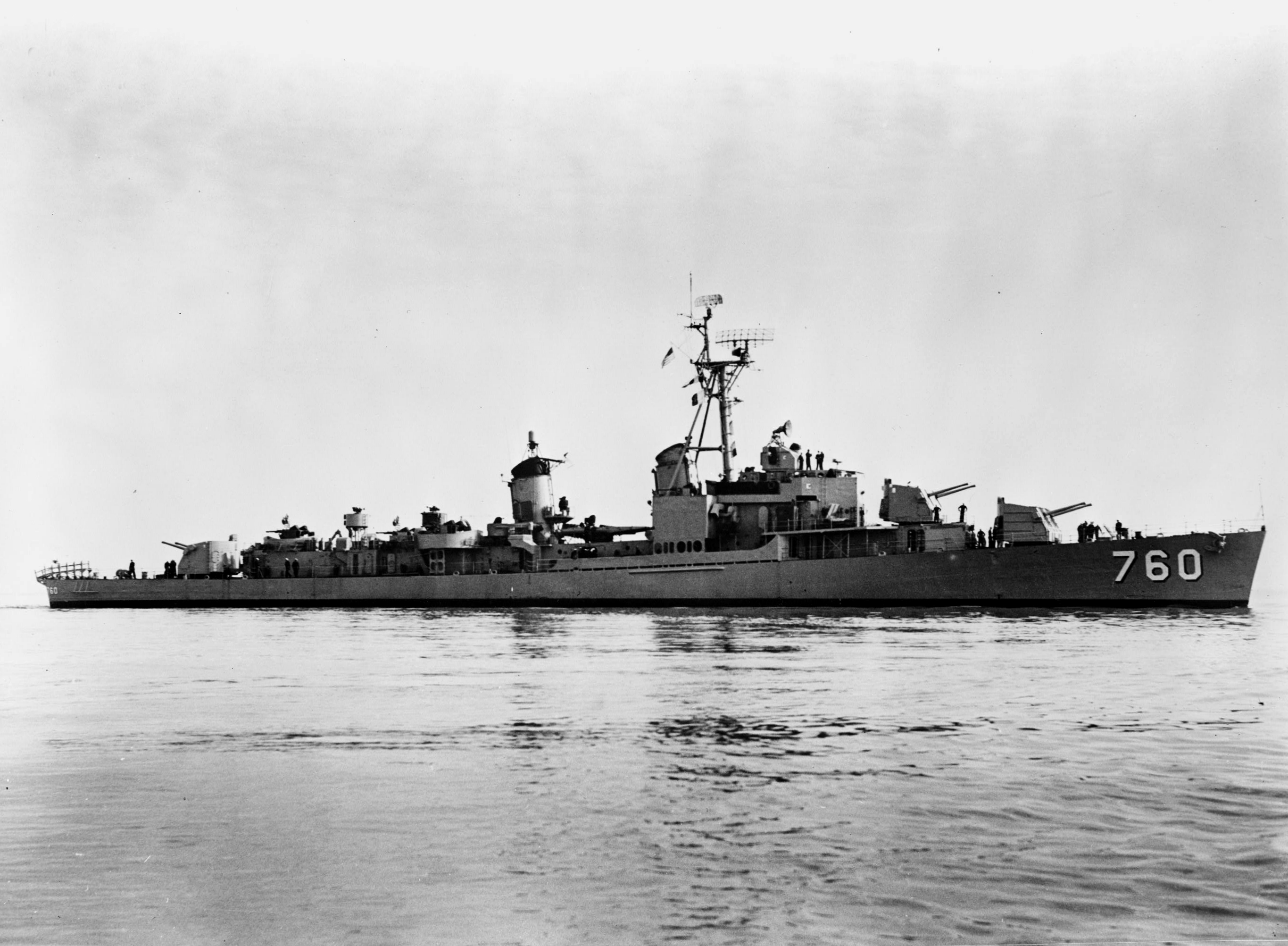
John W. Thomason underway on 28 March 1957

From 1954 to 1956 John W. Thomason returned to the now-familiar waters off Korea and in the Formosa Strait, serving with the 7th Fleet. The first half of 1957 was spent in readiness exercises off San Diego. John W. Thomason then sailed on 29 July for a cruise which took her to Pago Pago, Auckland, and Manus. Upon arrival at Yokosuka on 7 September 1957 she resumed operations in the Formosa Straits and antisubmarine exercises with 7th Fleet ships. The ship returned to San Diego 8 January 1958, and conducted maneuvers off California and Hawaii.

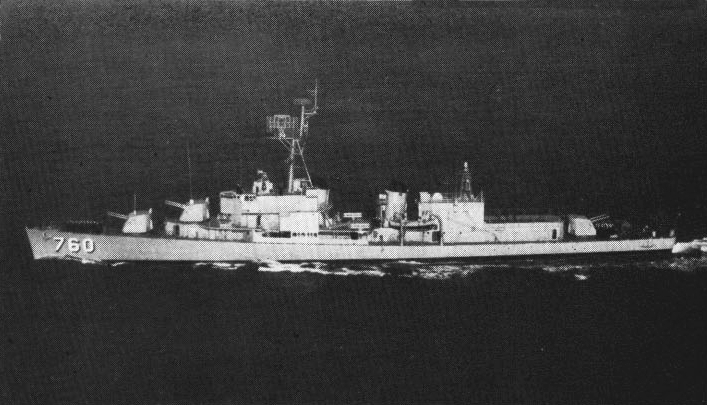
John W. Thomason underway in 1960

In March 1959, John W. Thomason entered Long Beach Naval Shipyard as the prototype ship for the new Fleet Rehabilitation and Modernization (FRAM) program. During this extensive repair and modernization period she received a helicopter deck and hangar aft, variable depth sonar, the latest electronic equipment, and many improvements in living and working spaces. The conversion was followed by extensive trials and local training operations. As the new flagship of Destroyer Division 72, she sailed on 8 March 1961 for 7th Fleet duty. After further operation John W. Thomason sailed to San Diego, arriving 18 September 1961.

Extensive conversion and installation of new sonar equipment at Long Beach occupied the ship until July 1962. In December she took part in a massive antiaircraft exercise with units of the 1st Fleet off California. She sailed again for the Far East, a part of the ready-hunter-killer group. En route, however, she took part in recovery operations for Project Mercury as part of a task unit built around the aircraft carrier Kearsarge. During the cruise which followed, the ship trained in her antisubmarine warfare (ASW) tactics and became familiar with her new equipment in operations with 7th Fleet and the Japanese Maritime Self-Defense Force. John W. Thomason returned to San Diego on 3 December 1963.

==== Vietnam War ====
Most of 1964 was spent in ASW exercises in the Eastern Pacific. On 23 October, she sailed with Destroyer Division 213 for redeployment exercises in Hawaii. Exactly a month later, with four other destroyers, she got under way for the western Pacific screening Yorktown and arrived at Yokosuka, Japan on 4 December, joining the 7th Fleet. In the spring she earned her first battle star for operating in the troubled waters off the coast of Indochina from 21 March to 28 April 1965.

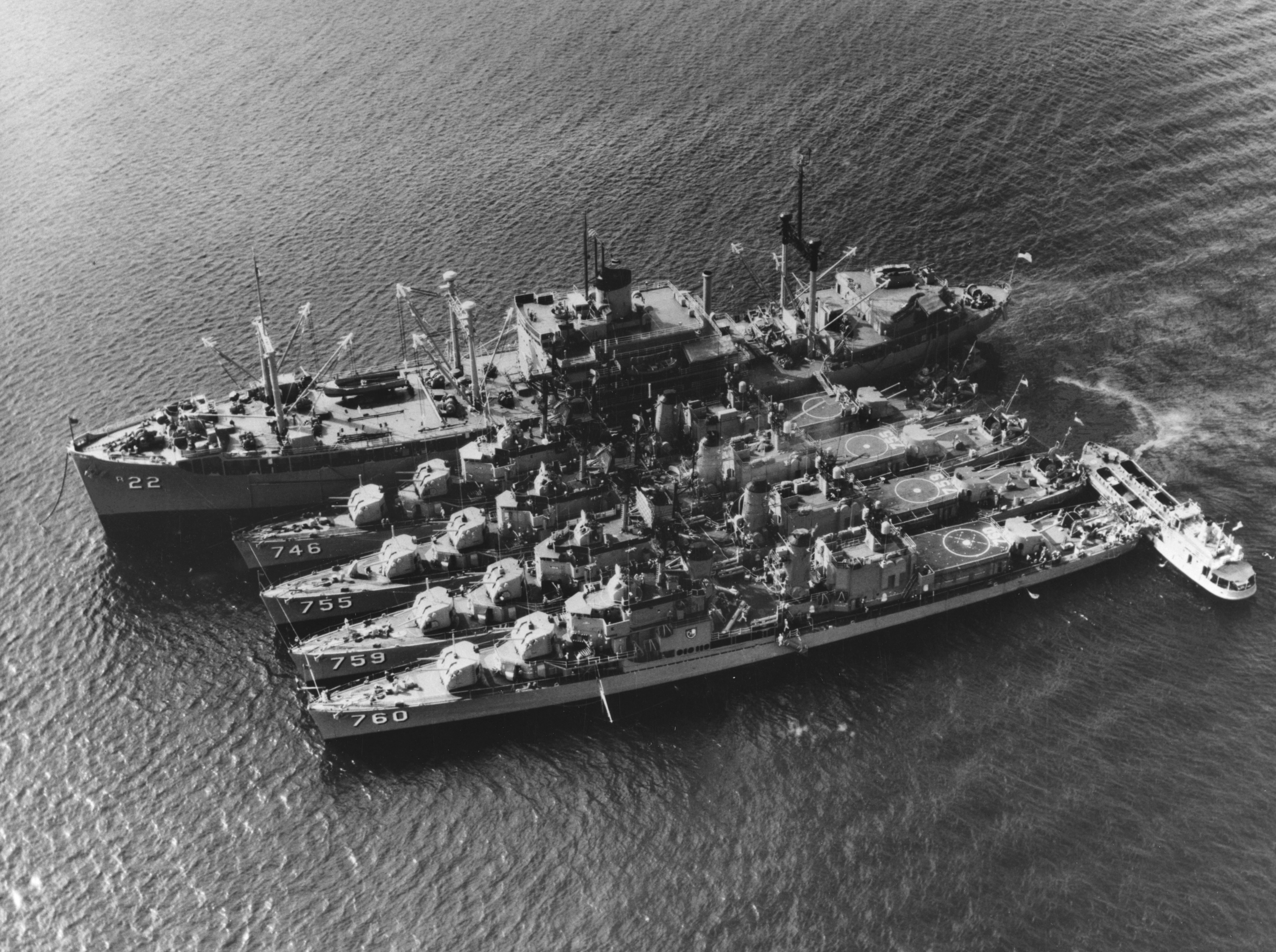
USS Klondike, Taussig, John A. Bole, Lofberg and John W. Thomason at Subic Bay on 1 November 1963

After returning to the West Coast, she departed San Diego for the Far East 22 March 1966 and reached Da Nang 19 April and the same day took station a few miles south of Chu Lai. At the end of April she supported Operation Osage, and landed north of Da Nang. On 13 May she sailed for Sasebo and upkeep. Back in the war zone 6 June, she provided gunfire support and supported Operation Deckhouse 1 from 17 to 23 June. That day she retired toward Hong Kong. The destroyer returned to gunfire support duties off South Vietnam 16 August. From 18 to 23 August she supported the amphibious Ready Group and Special Landing Force in Operation "Deckhouse III." After visiting Guam and Japan, John W. Thomason headed home on 9 September, reached San Diego on 24 August and operated off the West Coast into 1967.

John W. Thomason's 1969 deployment was preceded by a most strenuous overhaul, refresher training, and a multitude of inspections. No sooner had the destroyer and her task group joined the 7th Fleet than the first of more than fifteen schedule changes was received. The ship was diverted to Subic Bay before sailing to the Tonkin Gulf for planeguard duties with Oriskany. The first major inport period was in Kaohsiung, Taiwan after which John W. Thomason returned to Yankee Station. Three weeks of uneventful plane guarding were followed by a week in Bangkok. Subic Bay followed and another upkeep period. This one was cut short by a call for gunfire support in UV Corps near Vung Tau. After several days along the coast, the destroyer navigated the Nha Be River to participate in gunfire support in the Rung Sat Special Zone. Completing a week's duty as part of the naval gunfire support team, the ship returned to her plane guard duties in the Tonkin Gulf, this time for Bon Homme Richard. During this period of duty, the destroyer rescued the crew from a crashed helicopter from Bon Homme Richard.

Six days of leave in Hong Kong and an upkeep period in Sasebo, Japan, followed. John W. Thomason then returned to Yankee Station and provided plane guard services for Hancock. John W. Thomason escorted Hancock to Subic Bay and back to Yankee Station before rejoining Bon Homme Richard in this last line period. On the return home, stops were made in Subic Bay and Yokosuka. The weather demonstrated its capabilities at an inopportune time and delayed the destroyer's return to San Diego until 29 October 1969.

John W. Thomason received seven battle stars for Korean service and three for Vietnam service.

=== Service in the Republic of China Navy ===
Transferred on 6 May 1974 and renamed ROCS Nan Yang (DD-917), taking over the name and pennant number from the ex-USS Plunkett. The ship underwent repair and was commissioned on 23 June 1975.

Her number was changed to DD-954 in the 1970s.

In 1982, she was again reclassified to DDG-917 after completing Wu-Chin I modernization program.

In 1984, a sailor named Huang Guozhang went overboard and was presumed dead, the investigation have not been disclosed.

On 15 August 1991, This ship completed the Wu-Chin II modernization program.

She served in the Republic of China Navy until 16 January 2000, when she was struck from the Navy list and on 3 August 2006, she was towed out to sea to be used as a target ship off Yilan Suao Port during Exercise Han Kwang 22.
