= Bishop Ward Normal and Collegiate Institute =

College in Huntsville, Texas (1883–1890)

- Active: September 17, 1883–c. 1890
- Founders: Charles W. Porter, Richard H. Cain, Thomas M.D. Ward
- Religious affiliation: African Methodist Episcopal Church
- Location: intersection of Old Madisonville Road and Pleasant Street; Huntsville, Texas, U.S. 30.727333°N 95.560467°W

Bishop Ward Normal and Collegiate Institute (1883 – 1890) was a private co-educational collegiate institute for African American students (or HBCU) in Huntsville, Texas, founded by the African Methodist Episcopal Church. It has a historical marker erected in 2018 by the Texas Historical Commission (no. 20117).

== History ==
Bishop Ward Normal and Collegiate Institute was founded in the early 1880s, by the African Methodist Episcopal Church (AME Church), under presiding Elder Charles W. Porter and Bishops Richard H. Cain and Thomas M.D. Ward. Joshua Houston is also sometimes credited as one of the founders. It was named after a clergyman. The board of trustees included Joshua Houston, Memphis Allen, Joseph Mettawer, John "Tip" Hightower, and Alex Wynne. The trustees were all affiliated with the AME Church, and had purchased the school building; located in a two-story brick mansion with eight-rooms, on 54 acres (22 ha) of land. Houston, Mettawer, and Allen had all served as county commissioners in Walker County, Texas during the Reconstruction era.

Opened September 17, 1883 on Smith Hill in Huntsville, Texas, it was the fifth college established for African American students in Texas. The college was led by professor Charles W. Luckie, and the first class had an enrollment of 10 students. The curriculum included liberal arts (Latin, Greek, mathematics and grammar), as well as teaching, domestic arts, manual labor, and trade.

By 1884, the school enrollment was about 164 students and included boarding facilities. It closed in c. 1890 due to a lack of funding.

== See also ==
- Sam Houston Industrial and Training School (1907–1930)
