= Joshua Houston =

American enslaved person owned by Sam Houston

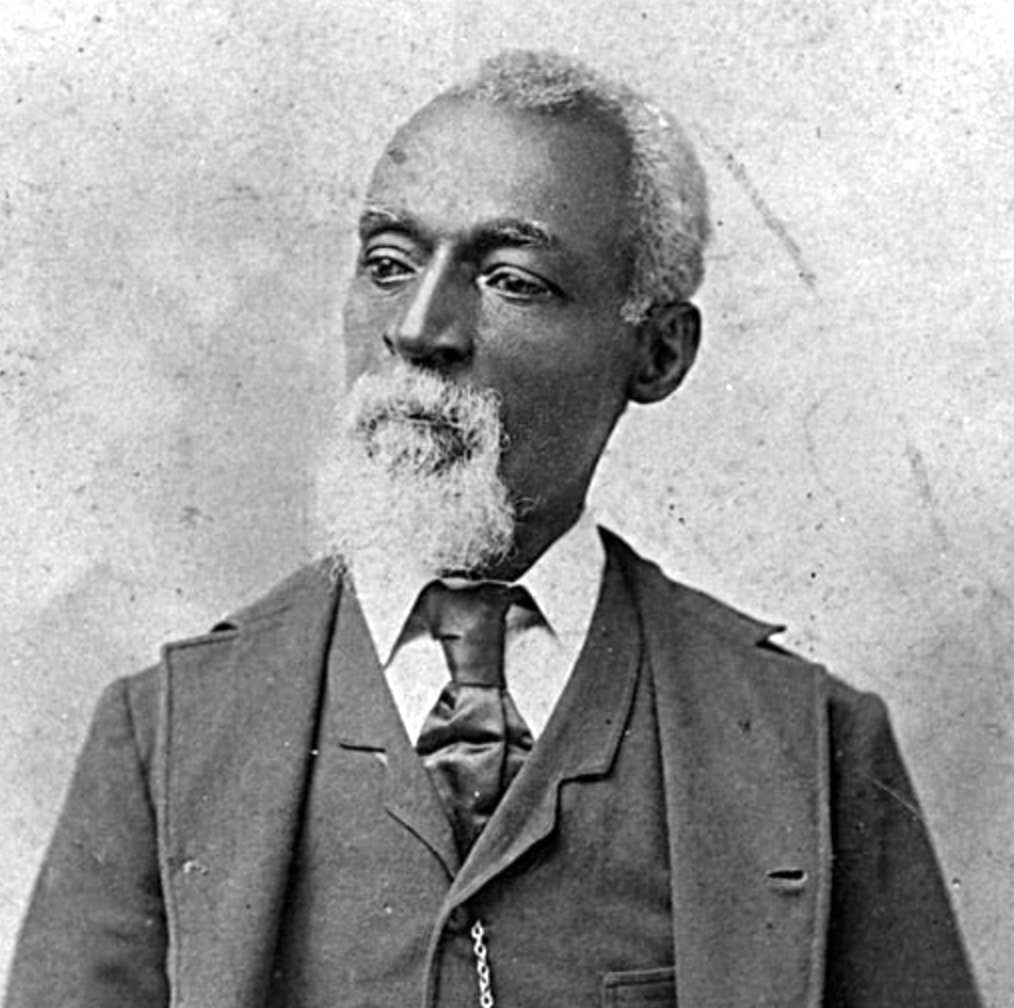
- Joshua Houston (c. 1898)
- Born: c. 1822; Perry County, Alabama, U.S.
- Died: 1902 (age 80); Huntsville, Texas, U.S.
- Resting place: Oakwood Cemetery, Huntsville, Texas, U.S.
- Known for: Formerly enslaved by Sam Houston businessman politician community leader
- Spouse: Sylvester Lee
- Children: 8, including Samuel W. Houston

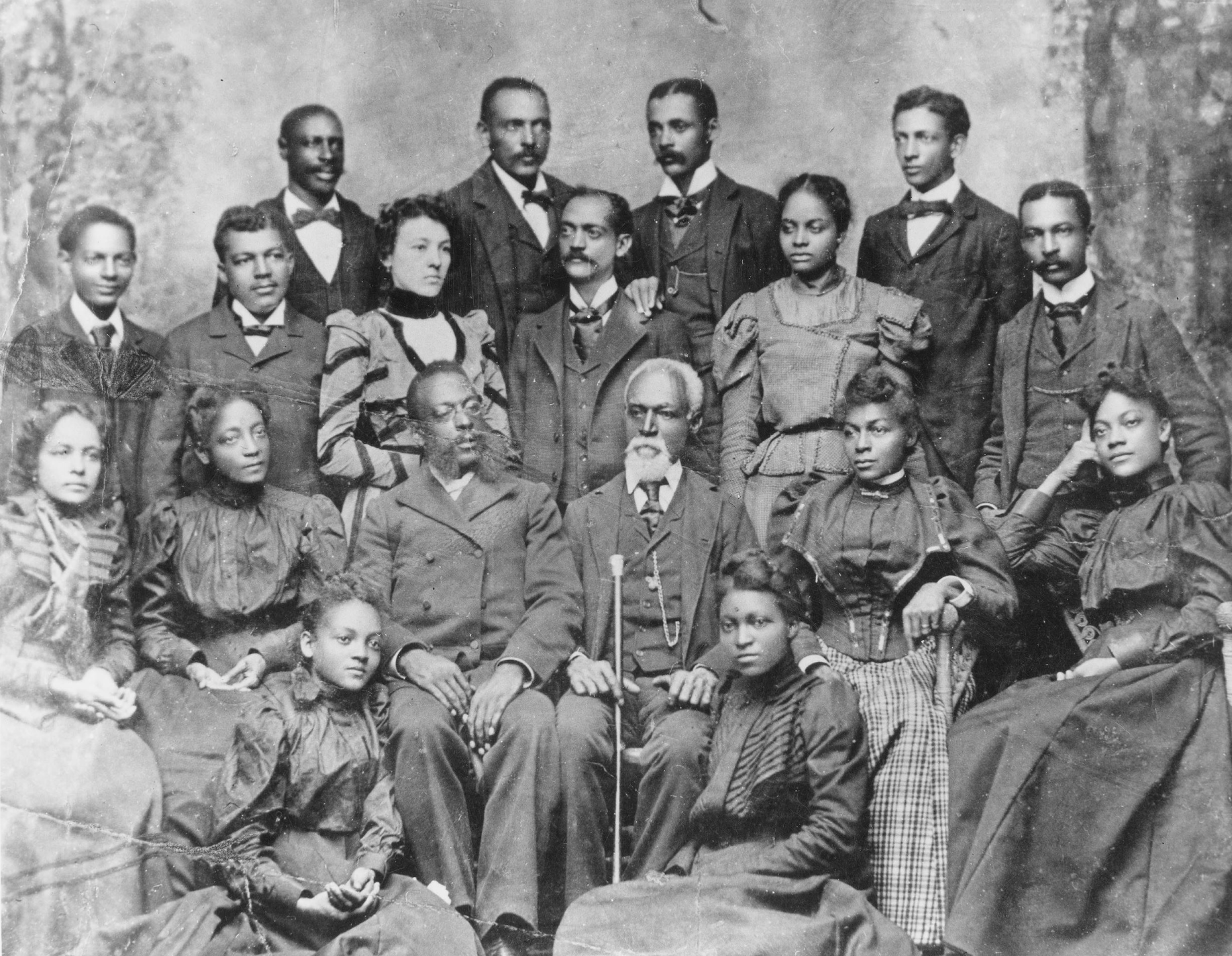
The Houston family, 1898, Joshua is seated in the front middle with the cane

Joshua Houston (c. 1822 – 1902) was an American businessperson, politician, and community leader. He had been born enslaved. He helped establish the Bishop Ward Normal and Collegiate Institute.

== Early life and career ==
Joshua Houston was born into slavery in about 1822 on the Perry County, Alabama plantation owned by Temple Lea and Nancy Moffette Lea, the parents of Margaret Lea Houston. When Margaret married Sam Houston, Joshua moved to Texas with the newlyweds.

Houston traveled with Sam Houston and worked on the construction of Raven Hill in Huntsville, Texas. He became educated and was elected to local public offices. He had three wives and was the father of eight children, including Samuel Walker Houston.

He helped establish the Bishop Ward Normal and Collegiate Institute in Huntsville, Texas, founded in 1883. Houston was a Texas delegate at the 1884 Republican National Convention in Chicago.

== Sam Houston slaves ==
The story of Sam Houston freeing his slaves before his 1863 death, in particular Joshua Houston, has been passed down through history, and is recounted in various books. In From Slave To Statesman, author Patricia Smith Prather depicts Houston reading a newspaper story to his slaves in the fall of 1862, about Abraham Lincoln's September 1862 Emancipation Proclamation, telling them they would all be free as of January 1, 1863. The Emancipation Proclamation was not announced in Texas until June 1865, Juneteenth, two months after Robert E. Lee surrendered at Appomattox.

In 1861, the Texas legislature amended its Constitution of 1845, making it illegal to free slaves in the state.

"No citizen, or other person residing in this State, shall have power by deed, or will, to take effect in this State, or out of it, in any manner whatsoever, directly or indirectly, to emancipate his slave or slaves."

— Texas Constitution, amended 1861, Article VIII, Section 2

Additionally, Section I removed any possibility of reverting that, "The Legislature shall have no power to pass laws for the emancipation of slaves".

When Houston died in 1863, his slaves were part of the inventory of his estate and valued at $10,530 (~$210,064 in 2024). Houston's son Samuel Walker Houston was born in February 1864, seven months after Sam Houston's death, and is always referred to as having been born into slavery.

== Death ==
Houston died in 1902 at the age of 80, and was buried at Oakwood Cemetery in Huntsville, the same cemetery where Sam Houston is buried.

== See also ==
- History of slavery in Texas
