= Huntsville, Texas =

City in the United States

Huntsville
- City
- City of Huntsville
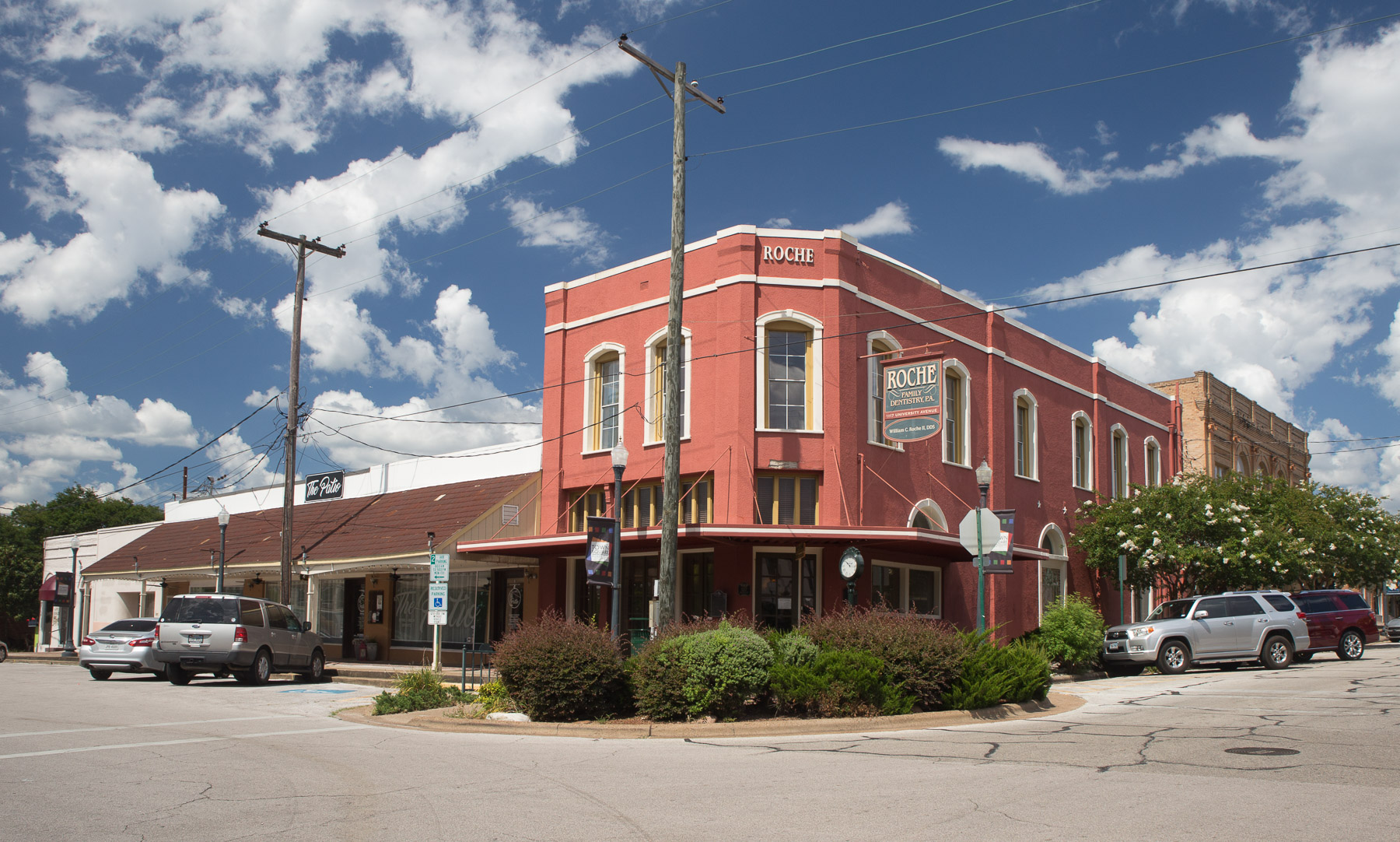
- Motto: Home Sweet Huntsville
- Location of Huntsville, Texas
- Coordinates: 30°43′20″N 95°33′12″W
- Country: United States
- State: Texas
- County: Walker
- Founded: 1835

Government
  - Type: Council-Manager
  - City Council: Mayor Andy Brauninger; Daiquiri Beebe; Russell Humphrey; Blake Irving; Pat Graham; Bert Lyle; Vicki McKenzie; Dee Howard Mullins; Joe Rodriquez
  - City Manager: Aron Kulhavy

Area
  - City: 43.42 sq mi (112.47 km^{2})
  - Land: 42.59 sq mi (110.30 km^{2})
  - Water: 0.84 sq mi (2.17 km^{2})
- Elevation: 371 ft (113 m)

Population (2020)
  - City: 45,941
  - Estimate (2022): 47,351
  - Density: 991.9/sq mi (382.97/km^{2})
  - Metro: 77,038
- Time zone: UTC−6 (Central (CST))
  - Summer (DST): UTC−5 (CDT)
- ZIP Codes: 77320, 77340–77344, 77348–77349
- Area code: 936
- FIPS code: 48-35528
- GNIS feature ID: 1382049
- Website: huntsvilletx.gov

Huntsville is a city in and the county seat of Walker County, Texas, United States and is also part of the Houston-Galveston combined statistical area. Its population was 45,941 as of the 2020 census. It is the center of the Huntsville micropolitan area. Huntsville is in the East Texas Piney Woods on Interstate 45 and home to Sam Houston State University, Texas State Prison, the Texas Department of Criminal Justice, Huntsville State Park, and HEARTS Veterans Museum of Texas.

The city served as the residence of Sam Houston, the first and third president of the Republic of Texas, who later represented the state in the U.S. Senate and as Governor of Texas. He is recognized in Huntsville by the Sam Houston Memorial Museum, a statue on Interstate 45, and Sam Houston State University, located in central Huntsville.

== History ==
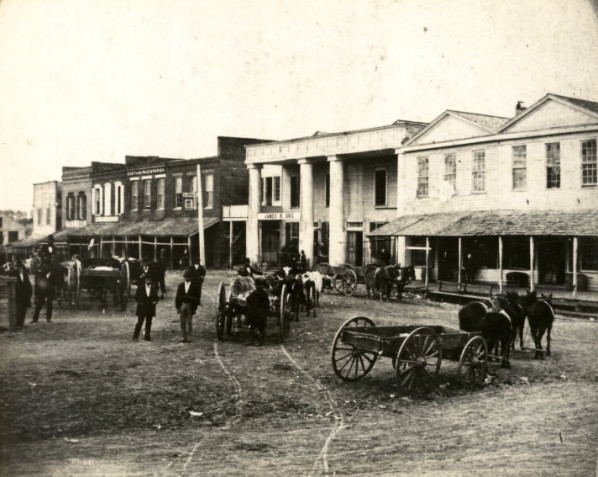
Downtown Huntsville in the 1870s

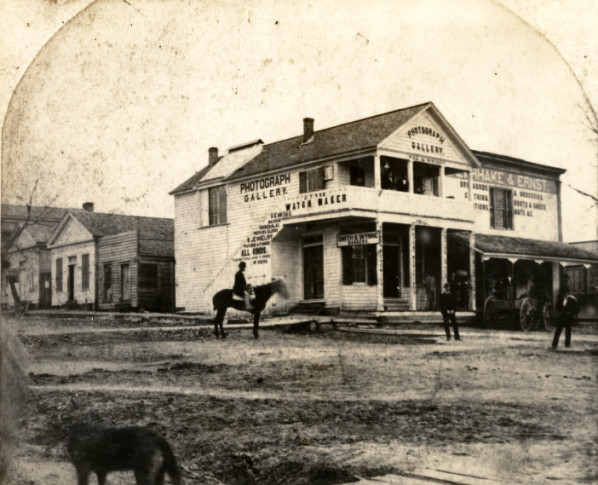
Downtown Huntsville in the 1870s

The city got its beginning circa 1836, when Pleasant and Ephraim Gray opened a trading post on the site. Ephraim Gray became first postmaster in 1837, naming it after his hometown of Huntsville, Alabama.

The hill at 7th Street and University Avenue, known as Cotton Gin Hill, was the site of several gins and became the ginning and shipping center.

Huntsville became the home of Sam Houston, who served as president of the Republic of Texas, Governor of the State of Texas, governor of Tennessee, U.S. senator, and Tennessee congressman. Houston led the Texas Army in the Battle of San Jacinto, the decisive victory of the Texas Revolution. He has been noted for his life among the Cherokees of Tennessee, and— near the end of his life — for his opposition to the Civil War, a very unpopular position in his day. Huntsville has two of Houston's homes, his grave, and the Sam Houston Memorial Museum. Houston's life in Huntsville is also commemorated by his namesake Sam Houston State University founded in 1879, and by a 70 ft (21 m) statue. (The towering statue, A Tribute to Courage by artist David Adickes, has been described as the world's largest statue of an American hero, and is easily viewed by travelers on Interstate 45.)

Bishop Ward Normal and Collegiate Institute opened in September 1883 in Huntsville. It was the 5th college of African Americans in the state of Texas. Huntsville was also the home of Samuel Walker Houston (1864–1945), a prominent African-American pioneer in the field of education. He was born into slavery on February 12, 1864, to Joshua Houston, an African American enslaved by Sam Houston. Samuel W. Houston founded the Galilee Community School in 1907, which later became known as the Houstonian Normal and Industrial Institute, in Walker County.

In 1995, on the grounds of the old Samuel W. Houston Elementary School, the Huntsville Independent School District, along with the Huntsville Arts Commission and the high school's Ex-Students Association, commissioned the creation of The Dreamers, a monument to underscore the black community's contributions to the growth and development of Huntsville and Walker County.

After a book display at the Huntsville Public Library generated a controversy among city officials in 2022, the library removed two book displays. Following the removal of the book displays, the city decided to privatize the library.

== Demographics ==
Historical population
| Census | Pop. | Note | %± |
|---|---|---|---|
| 1850 | 892 | | — |
| 1860 | 939 | | 5.3% |
| 1870 | 1,600 | | 70.4% |
| 1880 | 1,322 | | −17.4% |
| 1890 | 1,509 | | 14.1% |
| 1900 | 2,485 | | 64.7% |
| 1910 | 2,072 | | −16.6% |
| 1920 | 4,689 | | 126.3% |
| 1930 | 5,028 | | 7.2% |
| 1940 | 5,108 | | 1.6% |
| 1950 | 9,820 | | 92.2% |
| 1960 | 11,999 | | 22.2% |
| 1970 | 17,610 | | 46.8% |
| 1980 | 23,936 | | 35.9% |
| 1990 | 27,925 | | 16.7% |
| 2000 | 35,078 | | 25.6% |
| 2010 | 38,548 | | 9.9% |
| 2020 | 45,941 | | 19.2% |
| 2024 (est.) | 49,500 | | 7.7% |
U.S. Decennial Census; 2020 Census

=== Racial and ethnic composition ===
Huntsville city, Texas – Racial and ethnic composition Note: the US Census treats Hispanic/Latino as an ethnic category. This table excludes Latinos from the racial categories and assigns them to a separate category. Hispanics/Latinos may be of any race.
| Race / Ethnicity (NH = Non-Hispanic) | Pop 2000 | Pop 2010 | Pop 2020 | % 2000 | % 2010 | % 2020 |
|---|---|---|---|---|---|---|
| White alone (NH) | 19,384 | 20,537 | 21,158 | 55.26% | 53.28% | 46.05% |
| Black or African American alone (NH) | 9,114 | 9,695 | 11,420 | 25.98% | 25.15% | 24.86% |
| Native American or Alaska Native alone (NH) | 92 | 88 | 153 | 0.26% | 0.23% | 0.33% |
| Asian alone (NH) | 386 | 511 | 998 | 1.10% | 1.33% | 2.17% |
| Native Hawaiian or Pacific Islander alone (NH) | 19 | 16 | 34 | 0.05% | 0.04% | 0.07% |
| Other race alone (NH) | 45 | 38 | 223 | 0.13% | 0.10% | 0.49% |
| Mixed race or Multiracial (NH) | 349 | 452 | 1,023 | 0.99% | 1.17% | 2.23% |
| Hispanic or Latino (any race) | 5,689 | 7,211 | 10,932 | 16.22% | 18.71% | 23.80% |
| Total | 35,078 | 38,548 | 45,941 | 100.00% | 100.00% | 100.00% |

=== 2020 census ===
As of the 2020 census, Huntsville had a population of 45,941, with a median age of 31.6 years. 13.2% of residents were under the age of 18 and 11.1% were 65 years of age or older. For every 100 females, there were 137.3 males, and for every 100 females age 18 and over there were 142.8 males age 18 and over.

93.9% of residents lived in urban areas, while 6.1% lived in rural areas.

There were 14,564 households in Huntsville, of which 22.6% had children under the age of 18 living in them. Of all households, 29.3% were married-couple households, 27.6% were households with a male householder and no spouse or partner present, and 37.0% were households with a female householder and no spouse or partner present. About 36.7% of all households were made up of individuals and 9.5% had someone living alone who was 65 years of age or older.

There were 16,705 housing units, of which 12.8% were vacant. The homeowner vacancy rate was 2.4% and the rental vacancy rate was 11.0%.

Racial composition as of the 2020 census
| Race | Number | Percent |
|---|---|---|
| White | 22,971 | 50.0% |
| Black or African American | 11,609 | 25.3% |
| American Indian and Alaska Native | 298 | 0.6% |
| Asian | 1,012 | 2.2% |
| Native Hawaiian and Other Pacific Islander | 36 | 0.1% |
| Some other race | 6,895 | 15.0% |
| Two or more races | 3,120 | 6.8% |

=== 2010 census ===
As of the 2010 census, 35,078 people, 10,266 households, and 7,471 families lived in the city. The population density was 1438.3/km sq (10,135.1/mi sq). The 11,508 housing units ha an average density of 1143.8/km sq (1372.4/mi sq). The racial makeup of the city was 65.78% White, 26.14% African American, 0.33% Native American, 1.11% Asian, 0.07% Pacific Islander, 4.91% from other races, and 1.65% from two or more races. Hispanics or Latinos of any race were 16.22% of the population.

Of the 10,266 households, 25.3% had children under 18 living with them, 37.0% were married couples living together, 12.5% had a female householder with no husband present, and 46.7% were not families. Abot 30.8% of all households were made up of individuals, and 7.5% had someone living alone who was 65 or older. The average household size was 2.31 and the average family size was 2.97.

In the city, the age distribution was 15.1% under 18, 29.3% from 18 to 24, 30.8% from 25 to 44, 16.3% from 45 to 64, and 8.5% who were 65 or older. The median age was 28 years. For every 100 females, there were 152.9 males. For every 100 females age 18 and over, there were 163.8 males. The prison population is included in the city's population, which results in a significantly skewed sex ratio.

The median income for a household in the city was $27,075, and for a family was $40,562. Males had a median income of $27,386 versus $22,908 for females. The per capita income for the city was $13,576. About 13.1% of families and 23.9% of the population were below the poverty line, including 23.9% of those under 18 and 14.7% of those 65 or over.

== Geography ==
Huntsville is located at 30°42′41″N 95°32′54″W (30.711254, −95.548373).

According to the United States Census Bureau, the city has a land area of 35.86 square miles in 2010.

At the area code level, land area covers 559.661 sq mi and water area 7.786 sq mi.

Huntsville is about 70 miles (110 km) north of Houston. It is part of the Texas Triangle megaregion.

== Climate ==
The climate in this area is characterized by hot, humid summers and generally mild to cool winters. According to the Köppen climate classification, Huntsville has a humid subtropical climate, Cfa on climate maps.

Climate data for Huntsville, Texas (1991–2020 normals, extremes 1903–present)
| Month | Jan | Feb | Mar | Apr | May | Jun | Jul | Aug | Sep | Oct | Nov | Dec | Year |
|---|---|---|---|---|---|---|---|---|---|---|---|---|---|
| Record high °F (°C) | 88 (31) | 94 (34) | 99 (37) | 99 (37) | 98 (37) | 106 (41) | 106 (41) | 107 (42) | 108 (42) | 101 (38) | 92 (33) | 86 (30) | 108 (42) |
| Mean maximum °F (°C) | 75.6 (24.2) | 78.9 (26.1) | 83.7 (28.7) | 87.8 (31.0) | 92.3 (33.5) | 95.9 (35.5) | 98.6 (37.0) | 99.7 (37.6) | 96.4 (35.8) | 90.7 (32.6) | 83.3 (28.5) | 78.0 (25.6) | 100.7 (38.2) |
| Mean daily maximum °F (°C) | 58.0 (14.4) | 62.4 (16.9) | 69.1 (20.6) | 76.5 (24.7) | 83.2 (28.4) | 89.1 (31.7) | 92.2 (33.4) | 92.6 (33.7) | 87.1 (30.6) | 78.5 (25.8) | 67.6 (19.8) | 59.9 (15.5) | 76.4 (24.7) |
| Daily mean °F (°C) | 48.7 (9.3) | 52.5 (11.4) | 59.1 (15.1) | 66.1 (18.9) | 73.4 (23.0) | 79.7 (26.5) | 82.3 (27.9) | 82.4 (28.0) | 77.2 (25.1) | 68.2 (20.1) | 57.8 (14.3) | 50.5 (10.3) | 66.5 (19.2) |
| Mean daily minimum °F (°C) | 39.3 (4.1) | 42.6 (5.9) | 49.0 (9.4) | 55.7 (13.2) | 63.7 (17.6) | 70.2 (21.2) | 72.5 (22.5) | 72.3 (22.4) | 67.3 (19.6) | 58.0 (14.4) | 48.0 (8.9) | 41.2 (5.1) | 56.7 (13.7) |
| Mean minimum °F (°C) | 24.5 (−4.2) | 28.8 (−1.8) | 33.5 (0.8) | 41.6 (5.3) | 51.9 (11.1) | 63.4 (17.4) | 68.0 (20.0) | 67.1 (19.5) | 56.9 (13.8) | 43.7 (6.5) | 32.9 (0.5) | 28.2 (−2.1) | 21.8 (−5.7) |
| Record low °F (°C) | 1 (−17) | 3 (−16) | 17 (−8) | 30 (−1) | 40 (4) | 52 (11) | 57 (14) | 57 (14) | 40 (4) | 25 (−4) | 19 (−7) | 2 (−17) | 1 (−17) |
| Average precipitation inches (mm) | 4.57 (116) | 3.38 (86) | 3.85 (98) | 3.89 (99) | 4.47 (114) | 5.45 (138) | 3.06 (78) | 4.14 (105) | 4.47 (114) | 4.63 (118) | 4.68 (119) | 4.73 (120) | 51.32 (1,304) |
| Average snowfall inches (cm) | 0.0 (0.0) | 0.0 (0.0) | 0.0 (0.0) | 0.0 (0.0) | 0.0 (0.0) | 0.0 (0.0) | 0.0 (0.0) | 0.0 (0.0) | 0.0 (0.0) | 0.0 (0.0) | 0.0 (0.0) | 0.0 (0.0) | 0.0 (0.0) |
| Average precipitation days (≥ 0.01 in) | 9.3 | 8.8 | 8.0 | 6.7 | 7.6 | 8.5 | 7.4 | 6.7 | 7.2 | 6.5 | 7.4 | 9.2 | 93.3 |
| Average snowy days (≥ 0.1 in) | 0.0 | 0.0 | 0.0 | 0.0 | 0.0 | 0.0 | 0.0 | 0.0 | 0.0 | 0.0 | 0.0 | 0.0 | 0.0 |
Source: NOAA

== Economy ==
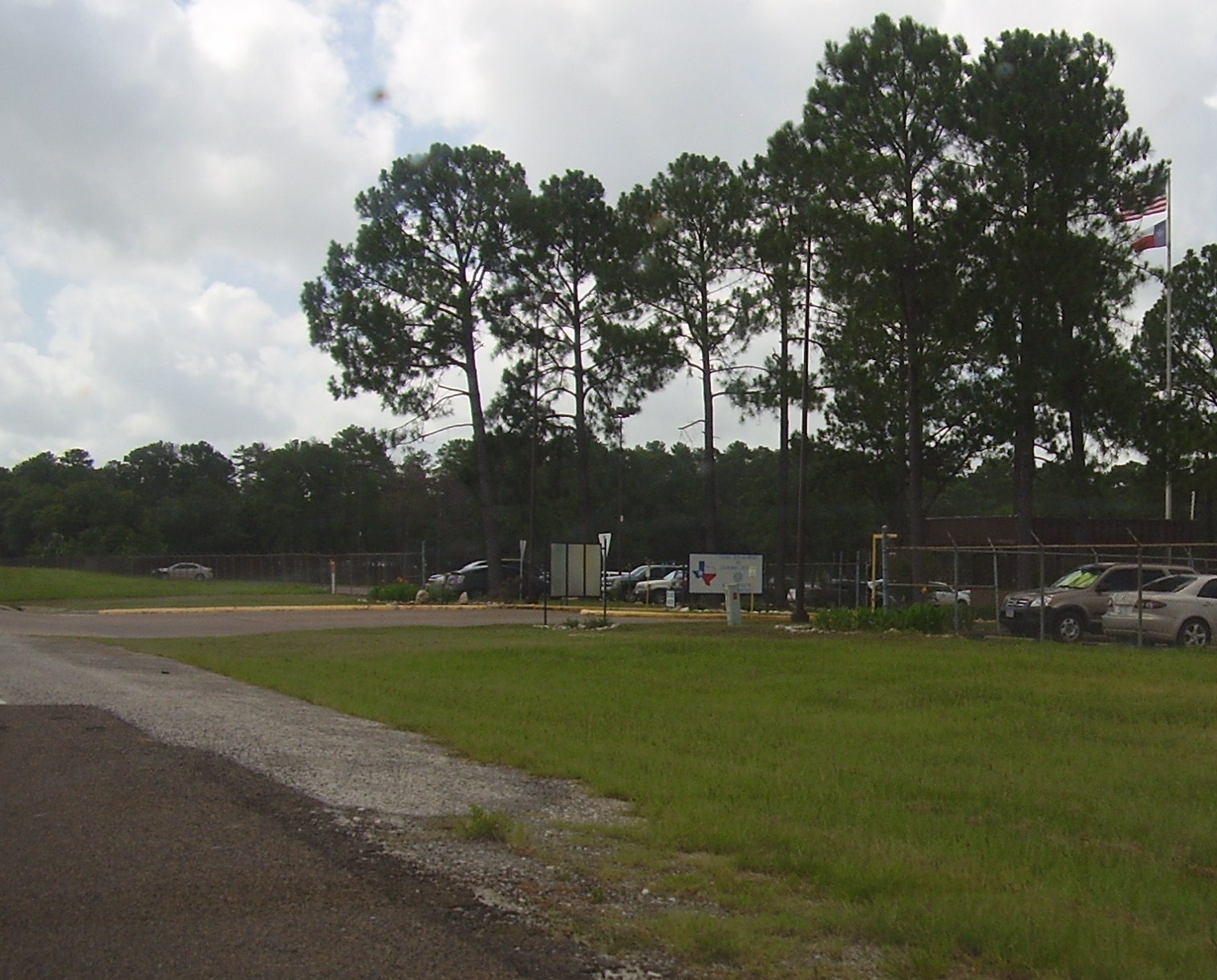
The BOT Complex, the administrative headquarters of the Texas Department of Criminal Justice, Huntsville's largest employer as of 2005

As of 2022, the largest employer in Huntsville is the Texas Department of Criminal Justice, with 6,744 employees. In 1996, the TDCJ had 5,219 employees in Huntsville. Robert Draper of the Texas Monthly described Huntsville as the "company town" of the TDCJ; he stated that the industry was "recession-proof" and that "It's hard to find a person in Huntsville who doesn't have at least an indirect affiliation with the prison system", since many businesses indirectly rely on its presence. As of 1996, the TDCJ employed over twice the number of people employed by Sam Houston State University, the city's second-largest employer.

As of 2022, Sam Houston State remained the second-largest employer in Huntsville, with 2,417 employees. The university has a strong role in the study of criminology. The third-largest employer is the Huntsville Independent School District, with 980 employees. The fourth-largest employer, Huntsville Memorial Hospital, has 552 employees; 485 employees work for the fifth-largest employer, Walmart.

As of 2020, Huntsville's average income was lower than Texas' average income.

== Government and infrastructure ==
=== State representation ===
==== Texas Department of Criminal Justice ====
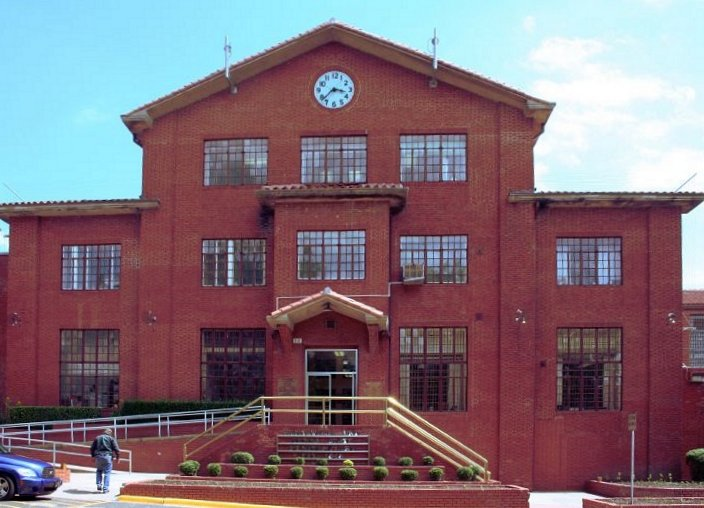
The Huntsville Unit, a Texas Department of Criminal Justice-operated prison in Huntsville, the home of the state's execution chamber

Huntsville has the headquarters of the Texas Department of Criminal Justice (TDCJ), the Texas agency that operates state correctional facilities for adults. The Texas prison system has been headquartered in Huntsville since Texas's founding as a republic, and the TDCJ is the only major state agency not headquartered in Austin, the state capital.

Several TDCJ prisons for men, including the Byrd Unit, the Goree Unit, the Huntsville Unit (home of the state's execution chamber), and the Wynne Unit, are within Huntsville's city limits. The Holliday Unit, a transfer unit, is also in Huntsville.

The TDCJ Central Region Warehouse and Huntsville Prison Store are in the TDCJ headquarters complex. The Food Service Warehouse is behind the Wynne Unit. The TDCJ operates the Huntsville District Parole Office in Huntsville.

As of 1996, the TDCJ director resided in a mansion across the street from the Huntsville Unit.

==== Other state agencies ====
The headquarters of the Texas Forensic Science Commission is located at Sam Houston State University.

== Transportation ==
Greyhound Lines operates the Huntsville Station in Huntsville. As of 2001 many former prisoners released from the TDCJ system use the station to travel to their final destinations. The station is three blocks uphill from the Huntsville Unit, a point of release for prisoners exiting the TDCJ.

Bruce Brothers Huntsville Regional Airport is located in Huntsville. Renamed from the Huntsville Municipal Airport in 2009, Bruce Brothers Huntsville Regional Airport is a city-owned, public-use airport. As of December 2015, it is still listed as the Huntsville Municipal Airport by the Federal Aviation Administration and the Texas Department of Transportation.

=== Major highways ===
- I-45
- US 190
- SH 19
- SH 30
- SH 75

== Culture ==
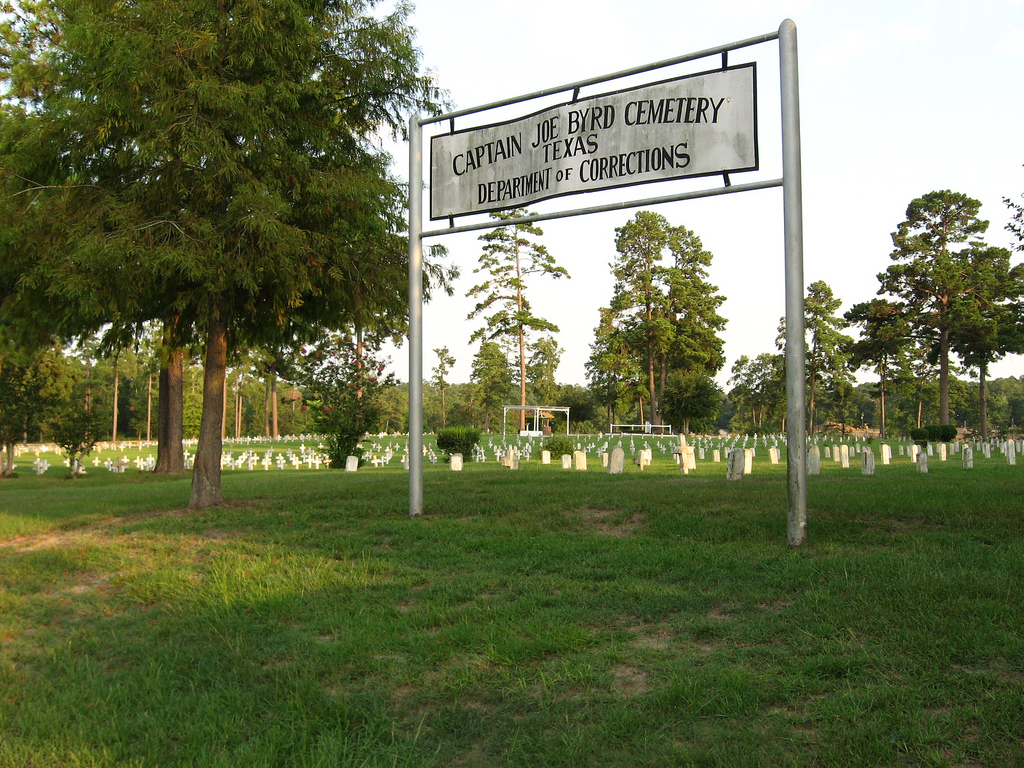
Captain Joe Byrd Cemetery, the Texas Department of Criminal Justice cemetery for deceased prisoners who are not reclaimed by their families

In September 2009, the Huntsville Cultural District was designated by the Texas Commission on the Arts as one of the first seven state cultural districts. Museums, art galleries, artist studios and workshops, historic homes, theaters and theatrical performances are located within the Cultural District in historic Downtown Huntsville. The Cultural District is also home to some of the finest historical architecture in Texas, including murals created by world-renowned artist Richard Haas and unique homes built from recycled materials created by Dan Phillips of Phoenix Commotion complement the historic aspects of the district.

Ruth Massingill and Ardyth Broadrick Sohn, authors of Prison City: Life with the Death Penalty in Huntsville, Texas, said that Huntsville shares several traits with other small towns. For instance, many insiders include members of Huntsville's founding families, who still reside in Huntsville. They also said, "Disagreement is a well-established Huntsville tradition." The authors say that debate is a significant part of the leadership agenda, and that the residents of Huntsville disagree about capital punishment.

== Media ==
=== Digital news ===
Hello Huntsville is the community's online positive news website.

=== Newspapers ===
The Huntsville Item is the community's newspaper.

The Houstonian is the SHSU student newspaper.

=== Radio ===
KRBE 104.1 FM Houston's #1 Hits

KHMX ("Mix 96.5") 96.5 FM Houston

KHSP-LP 94.3 FM The Spirit of Huntsville

KHVL 104.9 FM/1490 AM More Music, More Fun

KSAM 101.7 FM Today's Best Country and All Your Favorites

KSHU 90.5 FM The Kat - Huntsville's Choice for Variety

== Education ==
=== Primary and secondary schools ===
The majority of the City of Huntsville is served by the Huntsville Independent School District (HISD).

By 2007, a Huntsville community report stated that over 50% of the HISD students are "classified as economically disadvantaged"; this is a higher percentage than the overall state percentage. As of 2007, over 18% of the students do not graduate from high school.

List of schools (by education level):

Preschool/prekindergarten

- Gibbs Pre-K Center

Elementary

- Estella Stewart Elementary School
- Huntsville Elementary School
- Samuel W. Houston Elementary School
- Scott E Johnson Elementary School

Intermediate

- Huntsville Intermediate School

Middle

- Mance Park Middle School

High

- Huntsville High School

Private

- Alpha Omega Academy (Pre-K–12)
- Tomorrow's Promise, The Montessori School of Huntsville (Pre-K–12)
- Summit Christian Academy (Pre-K–12)

A very small portion of the city of Huntsville is within the New Waverly Independent School District.

=== Colleges and universities ===
Sam Houston State University is located in Huntsville. It also served as the first location for Austin College.

Residents of both Huntsville ISD and New Waverly ISD (and therefore the whole city of Huntsville) are served by the Lone Star College System (formerly North Harris-Montgomery Community College).

=== Public libraries ===
The 7,000-square-foot (650 m^{2}) Huntsville Public Library opened on Sunday September 24, 1967 after the group "Friends for a Huntsville Public Library" had campaigned for the opening of a public library. The Huntsville Public Library provides a relevant print collection, as well as offering access to electronic resources and having over 40 public-access computers for adults, teens, and children. The Texas State library has made available a large array of professional databases, giving the public access to thousands of professional journals, encyclopedias, language programs, educational tutorials, and informational sites. Patrons of the Huntsville Public Library have access to information that was previously only available at university and major public libraries.

In 2022, the library took away a display related to LGBTQ topics. In December, the city council voted to have Library Systems and Services, a private company, operate the library.

=== Adult prisoner education ===
The Windham School District, which provides educational services to prisoners in the TDCJ, is headquartered in Building B in the Wynne Unit in Huntsville.

== Tourism ==
Huntsville has several tourist attractions, including an art tour, a downtown walking tour, a prison driving tour, Sam Houston's grave, the Sam Houston Memorial Museum, the Sam Houston Woodland Home, A Tribute to Courage (a 67-foot-tall statue of Sam Houston), the Texas Prison Museum, and a folk and cowboy music festival held every April. A Tribute to Courage is the world's tallest statue of an American hero. Standing on a 10-foot granite base, the 67-foot-tall statue of Sam Houston is visible from I-45 northbound for 6.5 miles. David Adickes, the creator of Big Sam, transformed 60 tons of concrete and steel into the monument and dedicated the statue to the City of Huntsville on October 22, 1994.

Within the Huntsville Cultural District, the Wynne Home Arts and Visitor Center offers a wide variety of arts and cultural programs tailored to the interests and needs of Huntsville's diverse community.

The Sam Houston National Forest is one of just four national forests in Texas. The forest contains 163,037 acres between Huntsville, Conroe, Cleveland, and Richards. The forest is home to the 128-mile Lone Star Hiking Trail, a portion of which has gained National Recreation Trail status.

== Photo gallery ==
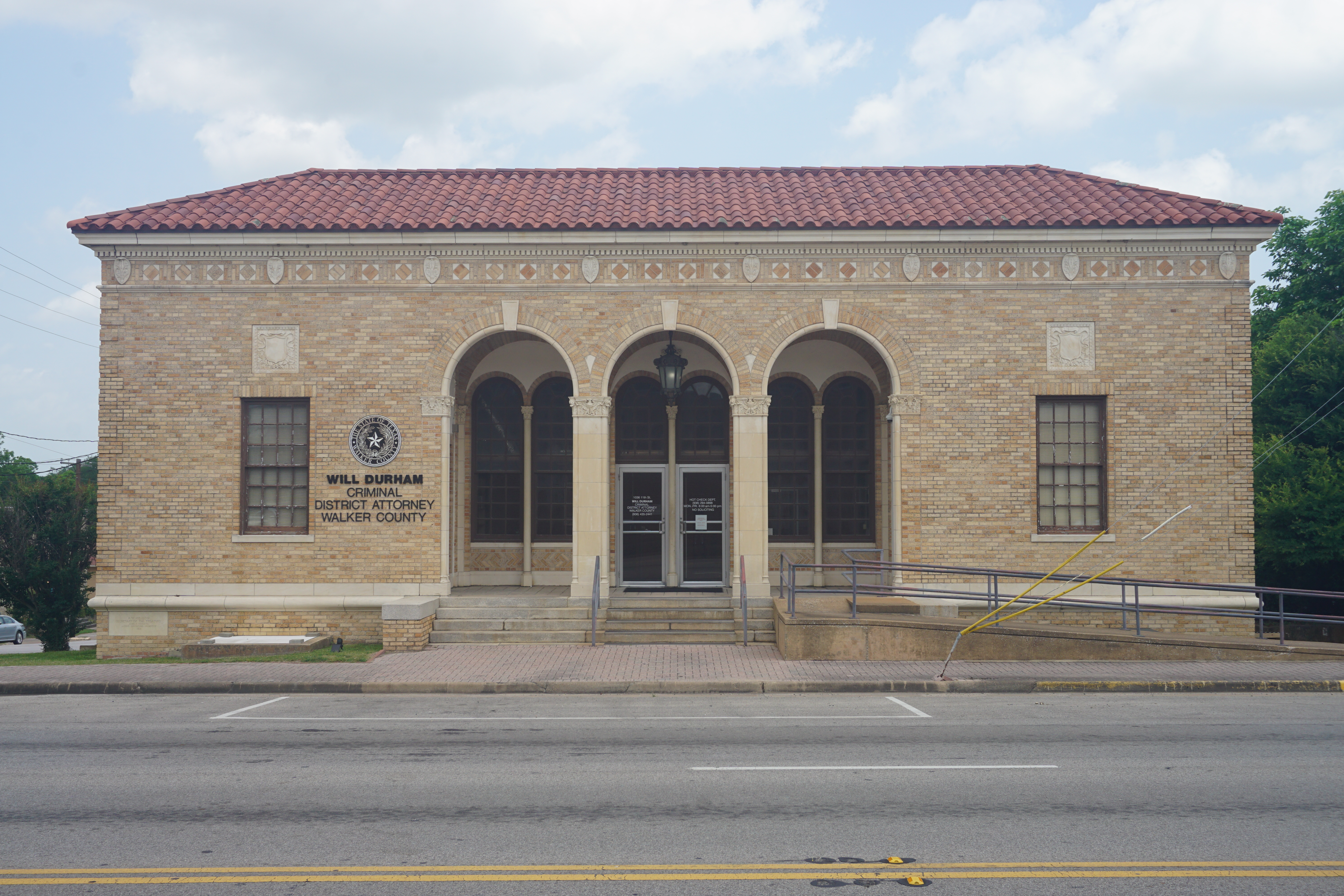
District Attorney's Office

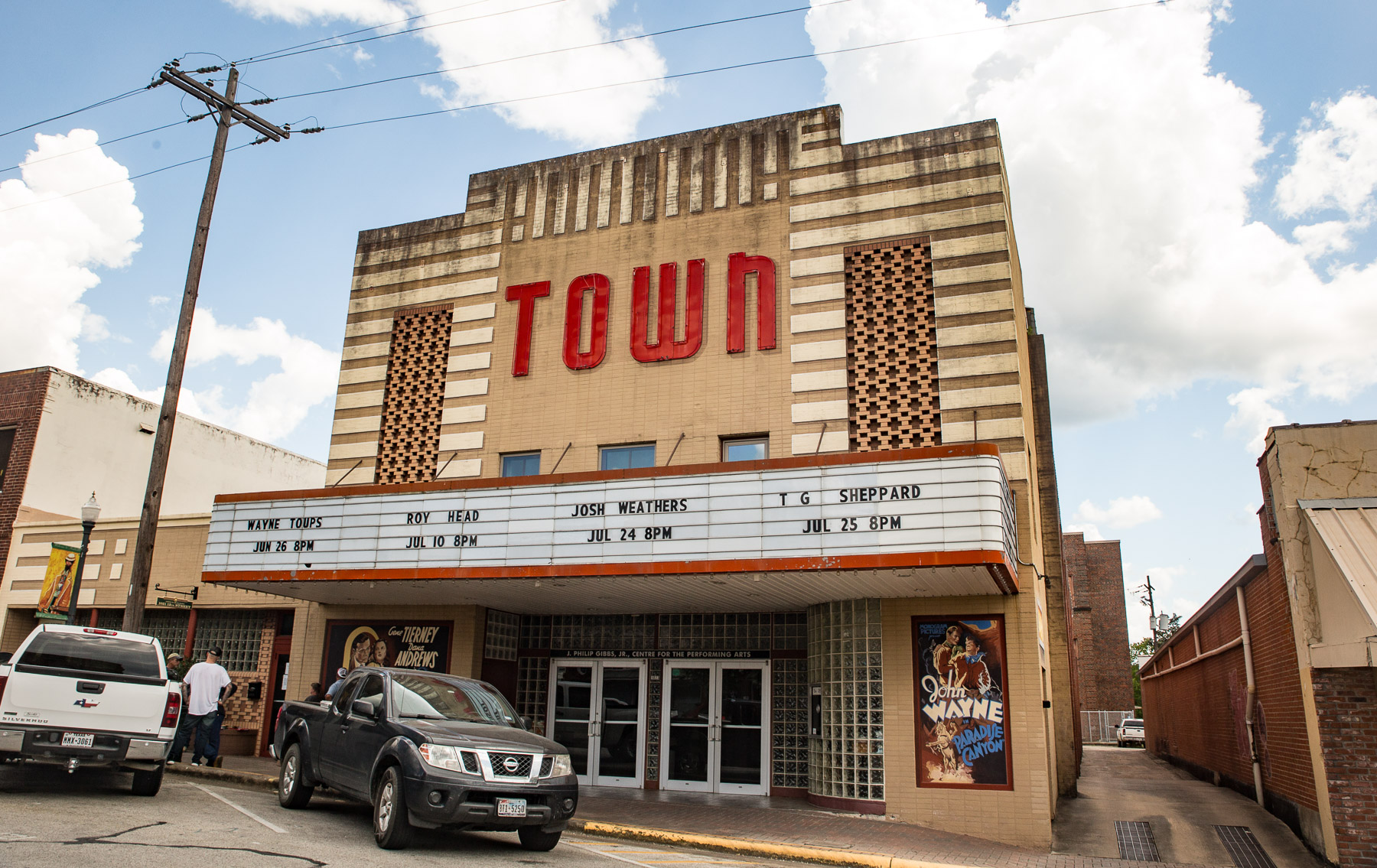
Town Theater

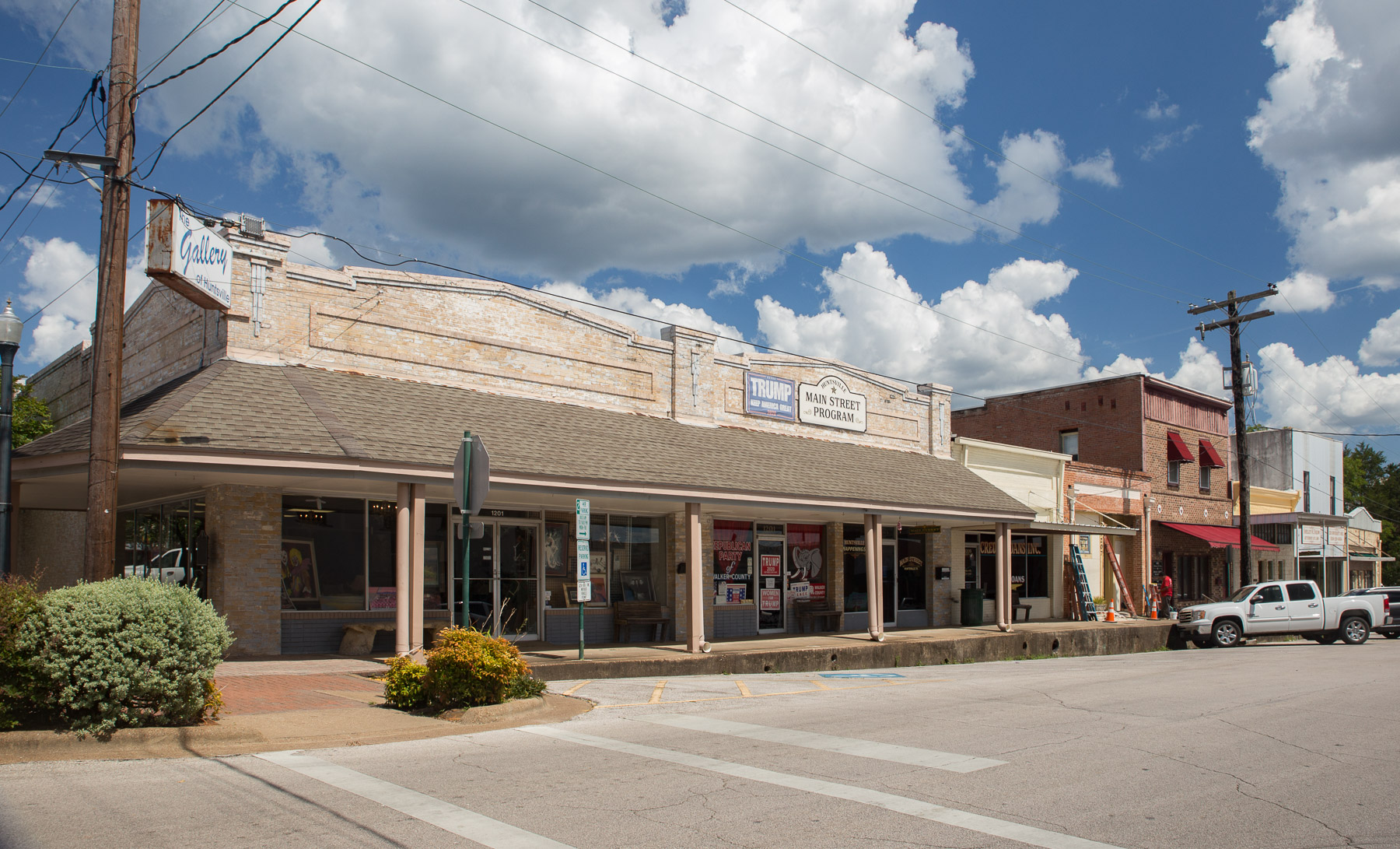
Downtown Huntsville

== Notable people ==
=== Academics ===
- Lois Blount (1896–1980), historian and teacher
- Mark Hanna Watkins (1903–1976), linguist and anthropologist
- Samuel Walker Houston (1864–1925), pioneer

=== Arts and entertainment ===
- Cody Johnson (born 1987), country singer
- Dana Andrews (1909–1992), actor
- Erin Cummings, actress
- Richard Linklater (born 1960), movie director
- Steve Forrest (1925–2013), actor
- David Adickes (1927-2025), sculptor and painter

=== Businessmen ===
- Austin McGary (1846–1928) sheriff
- Captain James A. Baker (1857–1921), lawyer and banker
- James A. Elkins (1879–1972), lawyer and banker
- John N. Raney (born 1947), businessman and politician
- Judge James A. Baker (1821–1897), attorney and banker

=== Politicians ===
- Leonard A. Abercrombie (1832–1891), politician, lawyer, Confederate army officer
- Charles G. Keenan (1813–1870), politician and physician
- Charlie Wilson (1933–2010), politician
- David Catchings Dickson (1818–1880), politician
- Morgan Luttrell (born 1975), politician
- Rex Tillerson (born 1952), energy executive
- Joshua Houston (c. 1822 – 1902) politician, businessperson
- Sam Houston (1793–1863), politician
- Thaksin Shinawatra (born 1949), Thai politician

=== Print and journalism ===
- Craig Flournoy (born 1951), journalist and professor
- Dan Rather (born 1931), journalist
- Dave Ward (1939-2025), journalist
- Jacy Reese Anthis (born 1992), writer
- John Thomason (1893–1944), author
- Marcus Luttrell (born 1975), Navy SEAL and author
- Royal Dixon (1885–1962), author

=== Sports ===
- Chuck Clements (born 1973), American football player
- Derrick Ross (born 1983), American football player
- James Davidson (born 1990), American football player
- Justin Gilbert (born 1991), American football player
- Matt Powledge (born 1987), American football coach
- T'Vondre Sweat (born 2001), American football player

== See also ==
- Texas Prison Rodeo
- Captain Joe Byrd Cemetery
