= KHVL =

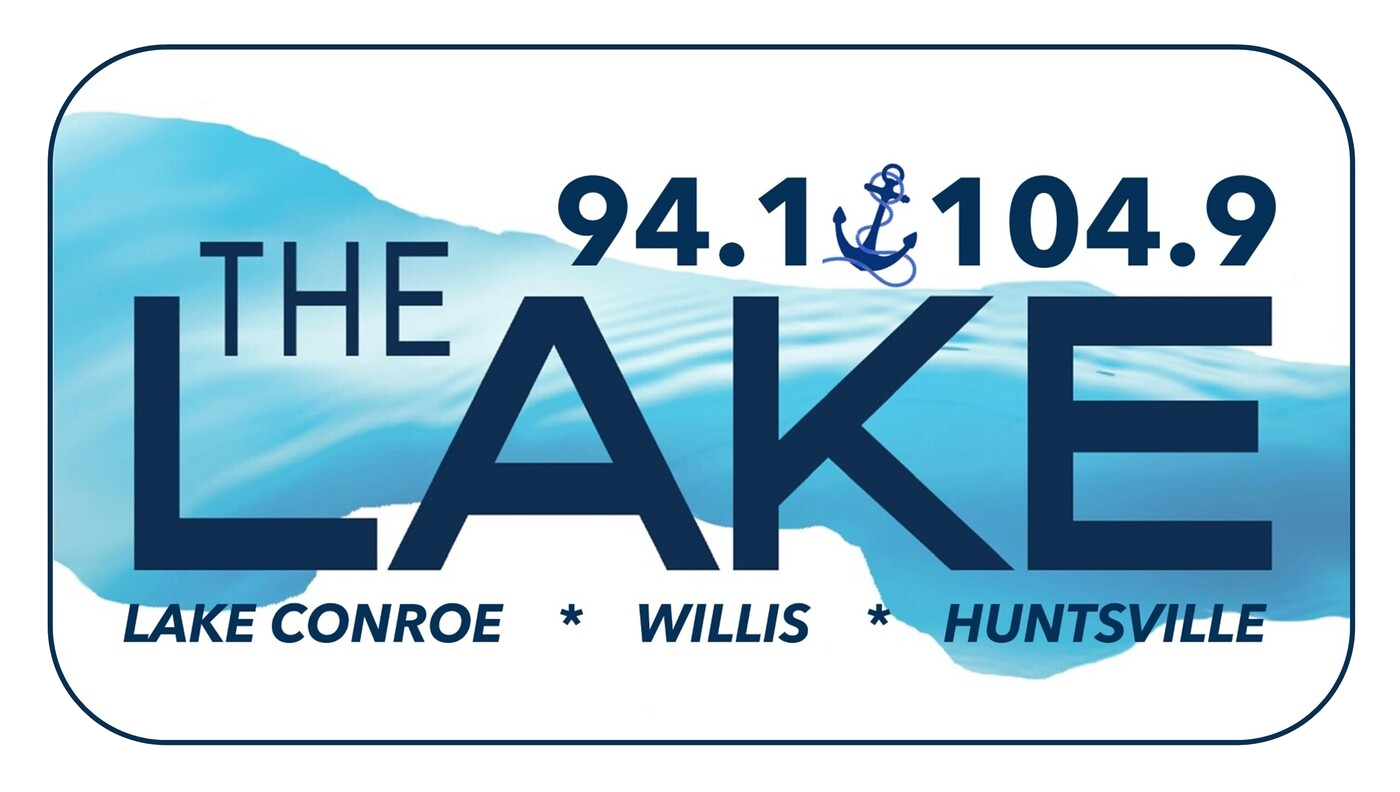
- Huntsville, Texas; United States
- Broadcast area: Huntsville, Texas; Lake Conroe, Texas
- Frequency: 1490 kHz
- Branding: 94.1 & 104.9 The Lake

Programming
- Language: English
- Format: Classic hits

Ownership
- Owner: HEH Communications, LLC.

History
- First air date: November 1, 1938; 88 years ago (as KSAM @ 1500)
- Former call signs: KSAM (1938–2001)
- Call sign meaning: HuntsVilLe

Technical information
- Licensing authority: FCC
- Facility ID: 70720
- Class: C
- Power: 1,000 watts unlimited
- Transmitter coordinates: 30°41′48.7″N 95°33′8.8″W
- Translator: See § Translators

Links
- Public license information: Public file; LMS
- Webcast: Listen Live
- Website: ilovethelakeradio.com

KHVL (1490 AM) is a radio station, paired with two FM relay translators. Licensed to Huntsville, Texas, 1490 KHVL and 104.9 K285GE primarily serve Huntsville and the surrounding Walker County rural areas. 94.1 K231DA relays KHVL's programming to extend the signal into Willis. The station's branding is The Lake and broadcasts a classic hits format.

== Translators ==
Broadcast translators for KHVL
Call sign	Frequency	City of license	FID	ERP (W)	HAAT	Class	FCC info	Notes
K231DA	94.1 FM	Huntsville, Texas	200662	250	111 m (364 ft)	D	LMS	First air date: June 20, 2018; 8 years ago
K285GE	104.9 FM	Huntsville, Texas	141208	250	50 m (164 ft)	D	LMS	June 13, 2008; 18 years ago (as 104.5 K283AW)

== History ==
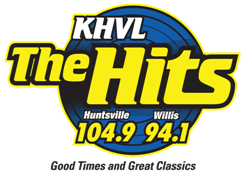
Previous logo

The station's history began on November 1, 1938, when the Federal Communications Commission (FCC) issued a license for a new station on 1500 kHz with the call sign KSAM. The original construction permit was granted to the Sam Houston Broadcasting Association, with the station operating as a daytime-only facility at 100 watts. The call letters were chosen as a tribute to Sam Houston, who is buried in Huntsville.

Following the North American Regional Broadcasting Agreement (NARBA) of 1941, the station shifted its frequency from 1500 kHz to its current home at 1490 kHz. This move facilitated an increase in power and expanded operational hours. In the 1950s and 60s, the station became a central hub for Walker County news, eventually transitioning through various formats including country and oldies. The facility was initially owned by the Sam Houston Broadcasting Association, H.G. Webster, President.

The station eventually changed its call sign to KHVL to provide a unique identity apart from its FM sister station. For many years, the station was known as "The Hits" before a strategic pivot in April 2022. At that time, KHVL rebranded as "104.9 The Lake," shifting to a classic hits format that emphasizes rock-leaning tracks from the 1970s and 1980s. The rebranding included the addition of FM translators to bolster the station's signal coverage in Willis and northern Montgomery County.

KHVL is owned and operated by HEH Communications, LLC. In 2022, the station and its sister station, KSAM-FM, were recognized by the Huntsville-Walker County Chamber of Commerce as the "Business of the Year". HEH Communications maintains local studios in Huntsville to serve the Walker County and northern Montgomery County areas.
