= Huntsville Independent School District =

School district in Texas, United States

Address
- 441 Fm 2821 East Huntsville, Texas, 77320; United States

District information
- Type: Public
- Grades: PK–12
- Schools: 11
- NCES District ID: 4824030

Students and staff
- Students: 11,318 (2023–2024)
- Teachers: 409.49 (on an FTE basis) (2023–2024)
- Staff: 476.55 (on an FTE basis) (2023–2024)
- Student–teacher ratio: 27.64 (2023–2024)

Other information
- Website: www.huntsville-isd.org

Huntsville Independent School District is a public school district based in the Hawkins Administration Building in Huntsville, Texas, United States.

In addition to Huntsville, the district serves the city of Riverside as well as rural areas in central Walker County. The current Superintendent is Dr. L. Scott Shepherd.

== Schools ==
=== High school ===
Huntsville High School

Location
- 650 Farm to Market Road 2821 East; Huntsville, (Walker County), Texas 77320; United States; 30.742200°N 95.535798°W

Information
- Type: Public high school
- School district: Huntsville Independent School District
- Principal: Robert Gilbert
- Staff: 129.78 (FTE)
- Enrollment: 1,847 (2023-24)
- Student to teacher ratio: 14.23
- Colors: Green and white
- Mascot: Hornets
- Nickname: Hornets
- Website: Huntsville High School

- Huntsville High School (Grades 9–12)

=== Middle school ===
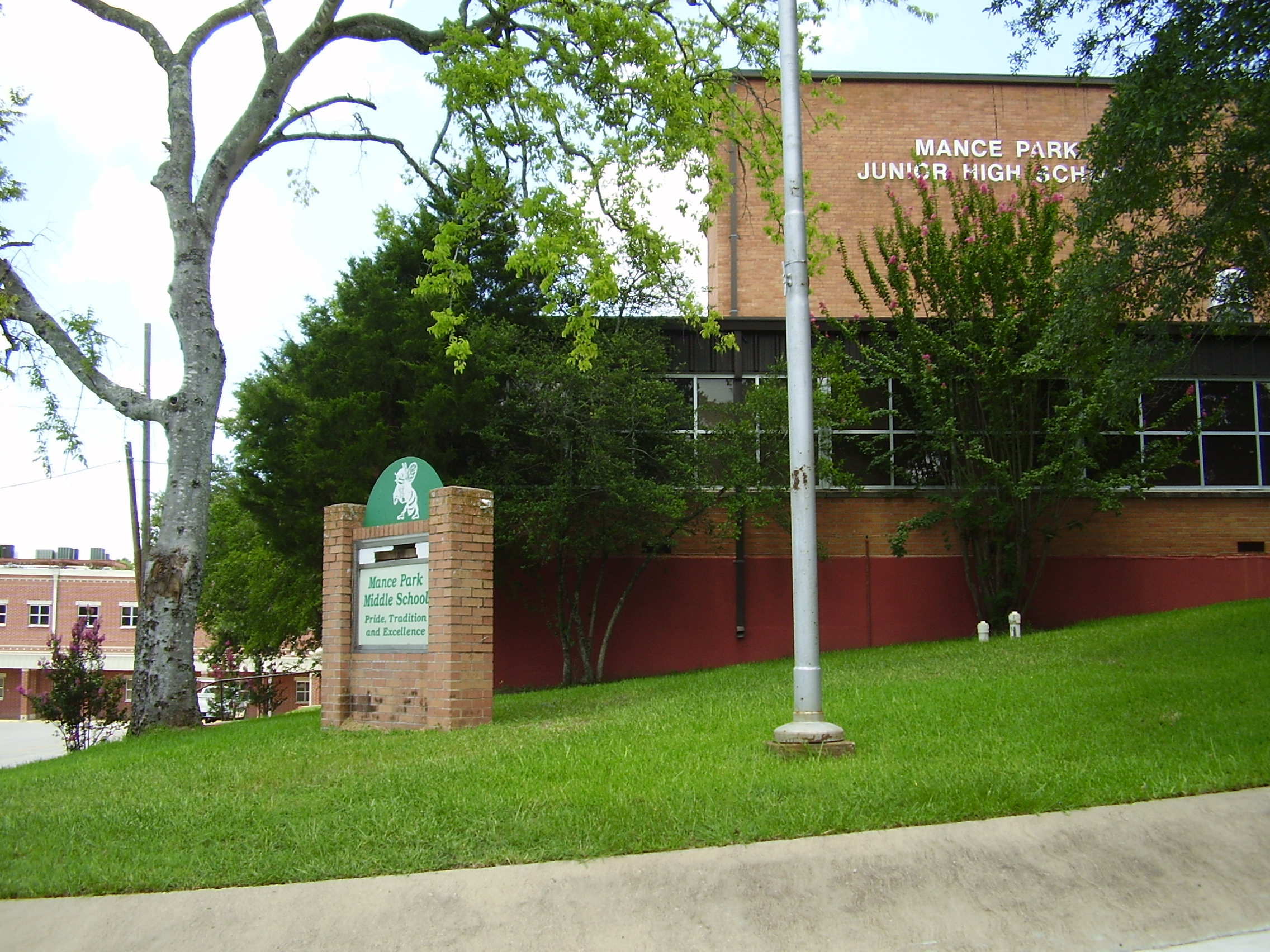
Mance Park Middle School

- Mance Park Middle School (grades 6-8)

Originally built as Huntsville High School in 1950. This campus then became Huntsville Junior High. Later, the campus changed to Mance Park Middle School. Today it is a middle school campus with approximately 1300 students per year attending.

=== Elementary schools ===
- Huntsville Elementary (Grades PK3–5)
- Samuel W. Houston Elementary (Grades PK3–5)
- Scott Johnson Elementary (Grades PK3–5)
- Estella Stewart Elementary (Grades PK3–5)

=== Former schools ===
- Samuel W. Houston High School
- Samuel W. Houston Elementary School
- Sam Houston Industrial and Training School (Grades 1-11)
- Huntsville Intermediate School (Grades 5-6)
- Gibbs Pre-K Center (Grades PK3-PK4)

== Standardized dress ==
Huntsville ISD has standardized dress for grades 6–12 adopted by the board summer 2017.

== Demographics ==
By 2007 a Huntsville community report stated that over 50% of the HISD students are "classified as economically disadvantaged"; this is a higher percentage than the overall state percentage. As of 2007 over 18% of the students do not graduate from high school.

== Notable alumni ==
- Erin Cummings, Huntsville High School Class of 1995 - Television, film, and stage actress and former Kilgore College Rangerette.
- Charles Harrelson, criminal and father of Woody Harrelson, occasionally attended Huntsville High on and off from 1951-1953.
- Richard Linklater, director, attended Huntsville High from 1975 to 1978 and heavily based Dazed and Confused (1993) on the experience.
- Rex Wayne Tillerson 69th United States Secretary of State from February 2017, to March 2018 under President Donald Trump.

== Racial integration ==
Until the 1960s, the school system, like many others in the United States, segregated schools by race, with white students attending one set of schools and non-white students attending another.

The district was fully racially integrated in 1968. Elementary schools began to be integrated before 1965. In 1965, students from non-white schools were allowed to apply to attend Huntsville High School instead of the non-white high school, Samuel W. Houston High School. One of the first African-American students to attend Huntsville High School was Joreen Kelly. She later became a teacher at Huntsville High School. The first African-American student to integrate Huntsville Elementary school was Janet Smither. (Now known as Janet Johnson)
