= Gerald Mann =

American football player and attorney general (1907–1990)

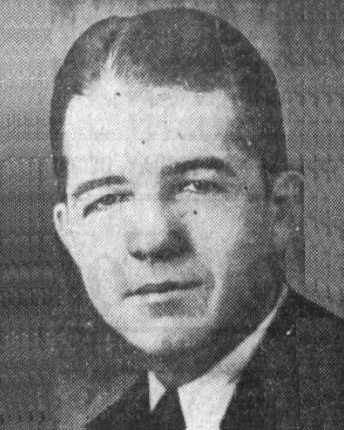

37th Attorney General of Texas
- In office January 17, 1939 – December 16, 1943
- Governor: W. Lee O'Daniel; Coke R. Stevenson
- Preceded by: William McCraw
- Succeeded by: Grover Sellers

Secretary of State of Texas
- In office January 15, 1935 – August 31, 1935
- Governor: James Burr V Allred
- Preceded by: W. W. Heath
- Succeeded by: R. B. Stanford

Personal details
- Born: January 13, 1907 Sulphur Springs, Texas, U.S.
- Died: January 6, 1990 (aged 82) Dallas, Texas, U.S.
- Party: Democratic
- Spouse: Anna Mary Mars (m. 1929)
- Education: Southern Methodist University; Harvard Law School
- Football career

Profile
- Position: Quarterback

Career information
- College: SMU (1925–1927)

Awards and highlights
- Third-team All-American (1926); First-team All-SWC (1927)
- College Football Hall of Fame (Class of 1969)

Gerald C. Mann (January 13, 1907 – January 6, 1990) was an American football player and the attorney general of Texas from 1939 to 1944.

Mann studied at Southern Methodist University, where he was twice named to all-conference football teams and was nicknamed the "Little Red Arrow." He subsequently worked his way through Harvard Law School; first with a job at a garment factory, later as a minister at a Congregationalist church.

After returning to Texas, Mann worked as an assistant attorney general under James V. Allred. Mann was a progressive and a strong supporter of Franklin D. Roosevelt. He was elected attorney general of Texas in 1938 and held that post until he resigned in December 1943. Mann aggressively pursued an agenda of trust-busting.

Mann ran for the U.S. Senate in the 1941 special election, called after the death of Senator Morris Sheppard. His opponents included Lyndon B. Johnson, then a member of the United States Congress, and Governor Pappy O'Daniel, who won the seat.

After resigning as Attorney General, Mann resumed private law practice in Dallas. Remaining active in Democratic politics, he was Texas director of the Kennedy-Johnson campaign in 1960.

Mann died in 1990.

== Bibliography ==
- Robert A. Caro, The Years of Lyndon Johnson: The Path to Power

Party political offices
Preceded by William McCraw	Democratic nominee for Texas Attorney General; 1938, 1940, 1942	Succeeded by Grover Sellers
Political offices
Preceded by William McCraw	Attorney General of Texas; 1939–1943	Succeeded by Grover Sellers
