= Ernest O. Thompson =

American businessman and politician (1892–1966)

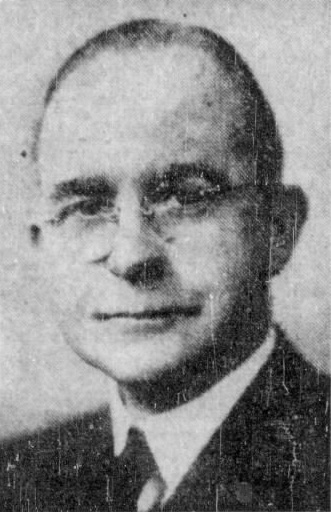

Railroad Commissioner of Texas
- In office January 1, 1933 – January 8, 1965
- Governor: See list: Ross S. Sterling; Miriam A. Ferguson; James V. Allred; W. Lee O'Daniel; Coke R. Stevenson; Beauford H. Jester; Allan Shivers; Price Daniel; John Connally
- Preceded by: Pat Morris Neff
- Succeeded by: Byron M. Tunnell

12th Mayor of Amarillo
- In office April 1929 – May 31, 1932
- Preceded by: Lee Bivins
- Succeeded by: Ross D. Rogers

Personal details
- Born: Ernest Othmer Thompson; March 24, 1892 Alvord, Texas, U.S.
- Died: June 28, 1966 (aged 74)
- Resting place: Texas State Cemetery, Austin, Texas, U.S.
- Party: Democratic
- Spouse(s): May Esther Peterson (m. 1924; died 1952) Myda Bivins
- Education: University of Texas (LLB)
- Occupation: Businessman, politician, attorney

Military service
- Allegiance: United States
- Branch/service: United States Army
- Rank: General
- Battles/wars: World War I World War II

Ernest Othmer Thompson (March 24, 1892 – June 28, 1966) was an American businessman, politician, and attorney who served as the 12th mayor of Amarillo from 1929 to 1932 as a member of the Democratic Party. He subsequently served on the Railroad Commission of Texas from 1932 to 1965, with his 33-year tenure on the commission being the longest in the state's history. Thompson was also an unsuccessful candidate for governor of Texas in 1938 and 1940.

== Early life and education ==
Thompson was born in Alvord, Texas, on March 24, 1892, as one of four surviving children of Lewis Oliver and Flora Lee Agnes (Murray) Thompson. He was a third-generation Texan. In 1902, Thompson's family moved to Amarillo, Texas, where his father ran a drugstore.

Thompson graduated from the University of Texas in 1917 with a Bachelor of Laws.

== Career ==
=== Military ===
Thompson joined the United States Army during World War I, serving in the infantry and becoming an expert in machine gun tactics. He was promoted to lieutenant colonel during the Meuse–Argonne offensive. Thompson returned to Amarillo in 1919 to practice law and manage the Amarillo Hotel.

=== Politics ===
A member of the Democratic Party, Thompson was elected the 12th mayor of Amarillo in 1928, having run on a platform of cutting utility rates. He delivered on this promise by leading a consumer boycott of telephones, thereby achieving a reduction in telephone rates.

Thompson's tenure as mayor began in April 1929 and concluded with his retirement on May 31, 1932. He was preceded in office by Lee Bivins and succeeded by Ross D. Rogers.

Thompson was an unsuccessful candidate for governor of Texas in 1938, being defeated by radio host and businessman W. Lee O'Daniel in the Democratic primary election. Thompson was also an unsuccessful candidate for governor in 1940, placing second to O'Daniel again.

=== Railroad Commission of Texas ===
Thompson was appointed to the Railroad Commission of Texas by Governor Ross S. Sterling in 1932, succeeding Pat Morris Neff, who had served as the 28th governor of Texas from 1921 to 1925.

Thompson rejoined the U.S. Army during World War II. Due to the Allies' need for a steady supply of fuel, Thompson was sent back to Texas to fulfill his duties on the Railroad Commission. After the war, Thompson was elected to three additional terms on the commission.

Thompson began serving on the Railroad Commission from January 1, 1933, and resigned on January 8, 1965, due to his health. His 33-year tenure on the commission remains the longest in the state's history.

=== Miscellaneous ===
In 1934, under advice of U.S. President Franklin D. Roosevelt, Thompson led in founding the Interstate Oil Compact Commission. He served as a member and chairman of this commission from 1935 to 1965.

For his efforts on the Railroad Commission, Thompson was appointed a colonel in the Texas National Guard by Governor James V. Allred in 1936. The following year, Roosevelt sent Thompson as an American delegate to the World Petroleum Conference in France. In 1952, Thompson was appointed a general of the National Guard by Governor Allan Shivers.

== Awards and honors ==
Thompson was awarded the American Petroleum Institute Gold Medal for Distinguished Achievement by the American Petroleum Institute in 1951.

== Personal life ==
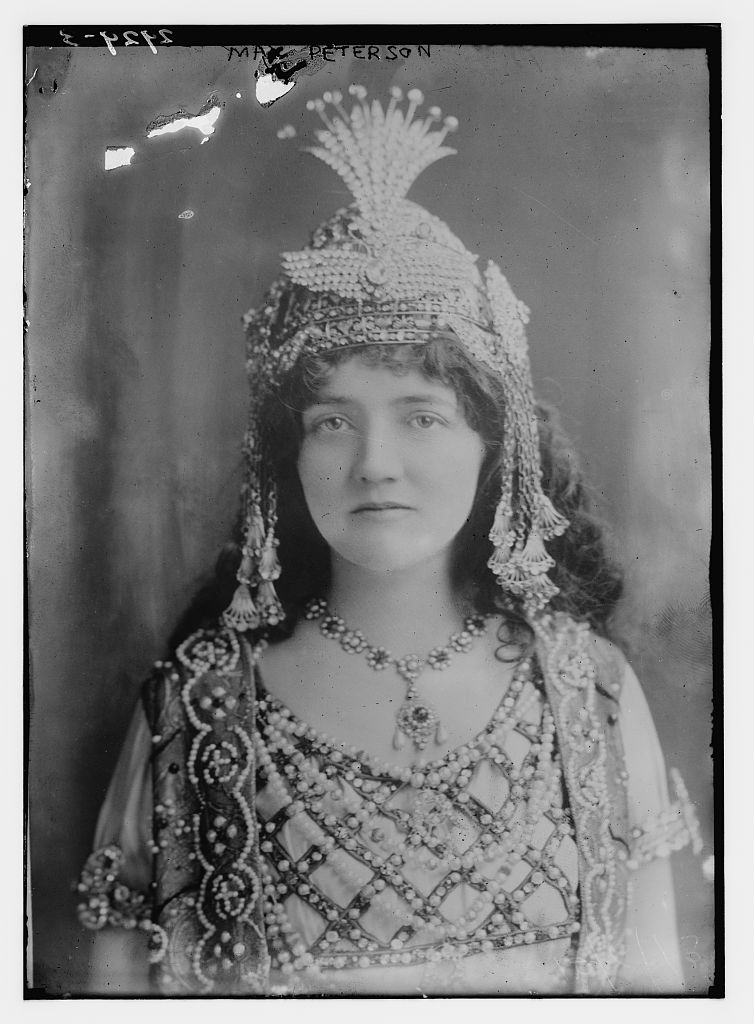
May Esther Peterson, Thompson's first wife, c. 1913

Thompson married opera singer May Esther Peterson (October 7, 1880 – October 8, 1952) in Bronxville, New York, on June 9, 1924. On October 1, 1952, May Thompson suffered a cerebral hemorrhage at the couple's summer house in Estes Park, Colorado, causing her to lapse into a coma. She was flown back to Austin, Texas, though never regained consciousness and died at Austin's Seton Infirmary on October 8, the day after her 72nd birthday. She was buried at the Texas State Cemetery, located in Austin.

A year after his wife's death, Thompson remarried to Myda Bivins, the widow of a cattleman.

== Death ==
Thompson died in a nursing home at the age of 74 on June 28, 1966. He was buried next to May Thompson in the Texas State Cemetery the following day. Although Thompson had Parkinson's disease, this was not provided as the specific cause of his death.

In Washington, D.C., President Lyndon B. Johnson issued a statement of regret over Thompson's death, lauding him as both "an acknowledged world leader in petroleum conservation" and "one of Texas's distinguished public servants".

== Legacy ==
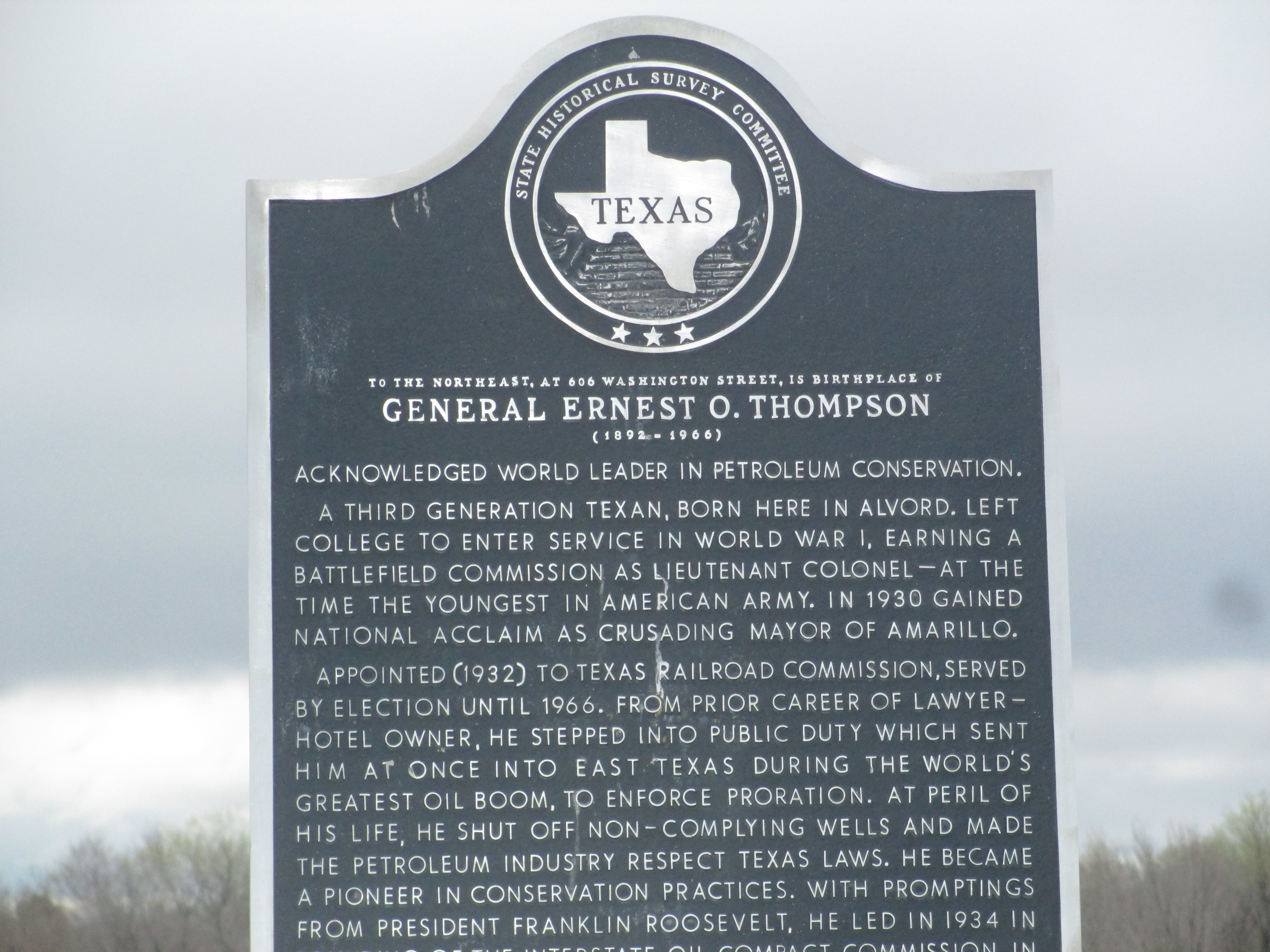
Thompson's historical marker, located in Amarillo, Texas

Amarillo named a park in honor of Thompson, in addition to placing a historical marker in the community. Moreover, the Austin Daily Tribune Building was renamed the Ernest O. Thompson State Office Building in Thompson's honor; the building currently houses the Texas Department of Licensing and Regulation.

== Electoral history ==
=== 1938 ===
1938 Texas gubernatorial election, Democratic primary
Party	Candidate	Votes	%
Democratic	W. Lee O'Daniel	573,166	51.41
Democratic	Ernest O. Thompson	231,630	20.78
Democratic	William McCraw	152,278	13.66
Democratic	Tom F. Hunter	117,634	10.55
Democratic	Karl A. Crowley	19,153	1.72
Democratic	P.D. Renfro	8,127	0.73
Democratic	Clarence E. Farmer	3,869	0.35
Democratic	James A. Ferguson	3,800	0.34
Democratic	Marvin P. McCoy	1,491	0.13
Democratic	Thomas Self	1,405	0.13
Democratic	S.T. Brogdon	892	0.08
Democratic	Joseph King	773	0.07
Democratic	James A. Ferguson	667	0.06
Total votes		1,114,885	100.00

=== 1940 ===
1940 Texas gubernatorial election, Democratic primary
Party	Candidate	Votes	%
Democratic	W. Lee O'Daniel (incumbent)	645,646	54.29
Democratic	Ernest O. Thompson	256,923	21.60
Democratic	Harry Hines	119,121	10.02
Democratic	Miriam A. Ferguson	100,578	8.46
Democratic	Jerry Sadler	61,396	5.16
Democratic	Arlon B. Davis	3,623	0.31
Democratic	R. P. Condron	2,003	0.17
Total votes		1,189,290	100.00

Political offices
Preceded by Lee Bivins	Mayor of Amarillo; 1929–1932	Succeeded by Ross D. Rogers
Business positions
Preceded by Pat Morris Neff	Railroad Commissioner of Texas; 1933–1965	Succeeded by Byron M. Tunnell
