= 1942 United States Senate election in Texas =

1942 United States Senate Democratic primary in Texas
- August 22, 1942
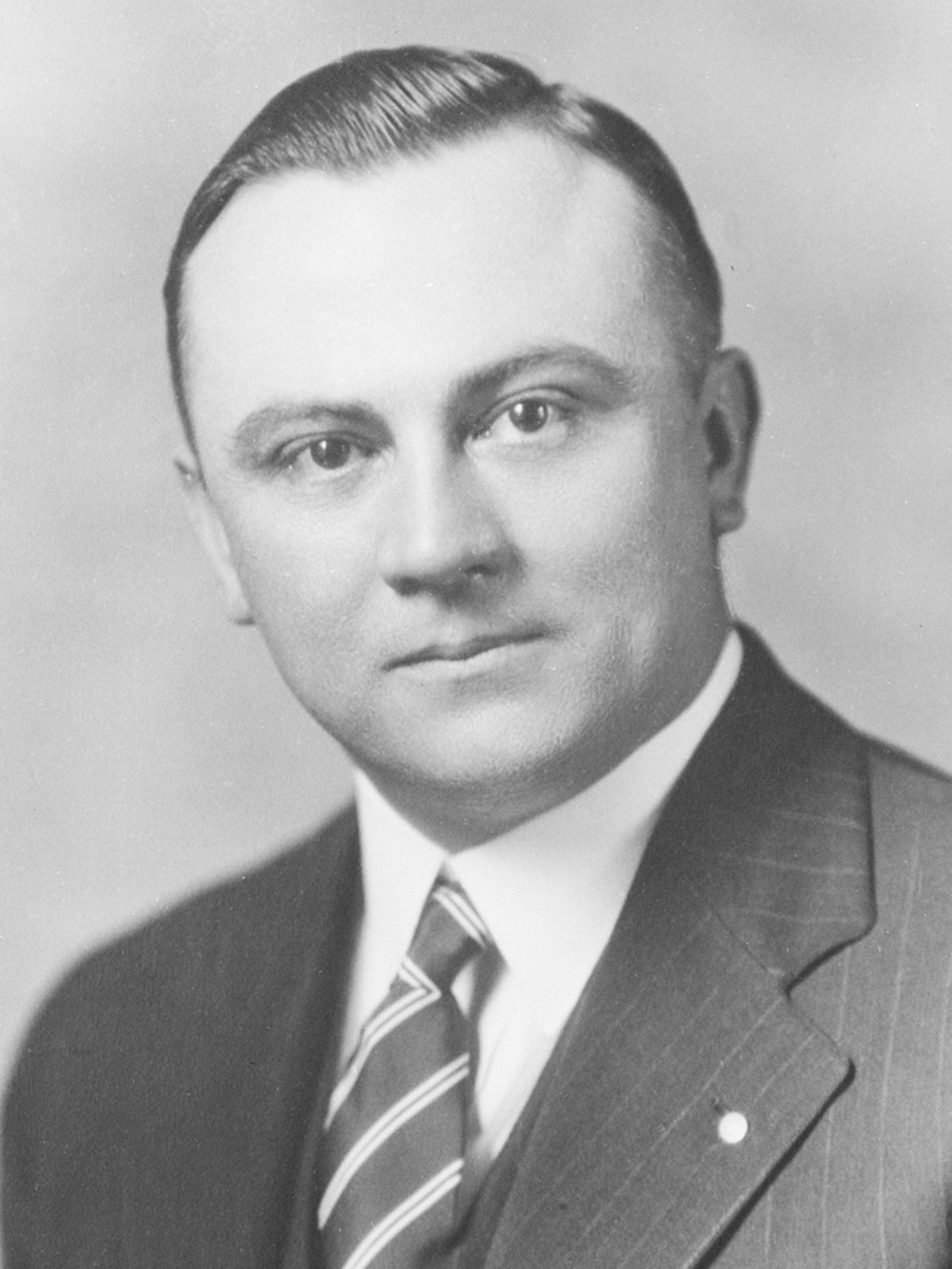

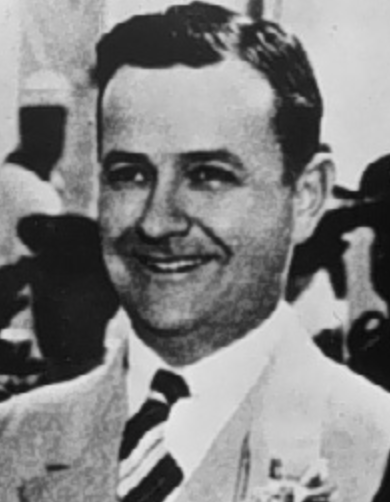
Nominee	Pappy O'Daniel	James V. Allred
Party	Democratic	Democratic
Popular vote	451,359	433,203
Percentage	51.03%	48.97%
- County results O'Daniel: 50–60% 60–70% 70–80% 80–90% Allred: 50–60% 60–70% 70–80% 80–90% >90% No votes
U.S. senator before election
Pappy O'Daniel
Democratic
Elected U.S. Senator
Pappy O'Daniel
Democratic

The 1942 United States Senate election in Texas was held on November 3, 1942. Incumbent Democratic U.S. Senator W. Lee "Pappy" O'Daniel was re-elected to a second term.

O'Daniel, who had only been elected to the seat in a special election the year before, narrowly fended off a primary challenge from former Governor James V. Allred. He won the general election with only nominal opposition. The Republican Party, now at its nadir in the state, did field a token candidate but did not factor in the election.

== Democratic primary ==
=== Candidates ===
- James Burr V Allred, Judge of the U.S. District Court for the Southern District of Texas and former Governor (1935–39)
- Daniel Moody, former Governor of Texas (1927–31)
- W. Lee O'Daniel, incumbent Senator since 1941
- Floyd Ryan

=== Declined ===
- Lyndon B. Johnson, U.S. Representative and candidate for US Senate in 1941 (ran for re-election)

=== Results ===
1942 Democratic U.S. Senate primary
Party	Candidate	Votes	%
Democratic	Pappy O'Daniel (incumbent)	475,541	48.34%
Democratic	James Burr V Allred	317,501	32.28%
Democratic	Dan Moody	178,471	18.14%
Democratic	Floyd E. Ryan	12,213	1.24%
Total votes		983,726	100.00%

=== Runoff ===
1942 Democratic U.S. Senate runoff
Party	Candidate	Votes	%
Democratic	Pappy O'Daniel (incumbent)	451,359	51.03%
Democratic	James Burr V Allred	433,203	48.97%
Total votes		884,562	100.00%

== General election ==
General election results by county.: O'Daniel 60–70% 70–80% 80–90% >90% / No vote

O'Daniel won every county in the state with over 65% of the vote. Callahan and Denton counties failed to report their results to the Texas Secretary of State in time to be canvassed, so their results are not included in the official vote totals.

=== Results ===
1942 U.S. Senate election in Texas
Party	Candidate	Votes	%
Democratic	Pappy O'Daniel (incumbent)	260,629	94.90%
Republican	Dudley Lawson	12,064	4.39%
People's Unity	Charles L. Somerville	1,934	0.70%
Total votes		274,627	100.00%
Democratic hold			

== See also ==
- 1942 United States Senate elections
