= Blanche Hecht Consolvo Cariaggi =

American

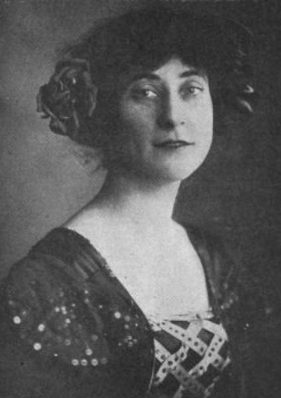
- Blanche Consolvo, from a 1918 publication
- Born: Blanche Hardy Hecht; December 28, 1880; Norfolk, Virginia
- Died: July 16, 1961 (aged 80); Norfolk, Virginia
- Spouse: Augusto Cariaggi

Blanche Hardy Hecht Consolvo Cariaggi (December 28, 1880 (Note: Some sources give Hecht's birth year as 1881 or 1883. In the 1900 United States census, she was described as being 19 years old and her birth date was recorded as December 1880. (via Ancestry)) – July 16, 1961) was an American singer and socialite from Virginia, and after 1922, an Italian countess.

== Early life ==
Blanche Hardy Hecht was born in Norfolk, Virginia, the daughter of Jacob Hecht and Susanne (Sanna) Moritz Hecht. Her parents were Jewish. Her mother was born in Germany, as were her paternal grandparents. Her father was a merchant born in New York City, and one of the trustees of the local synagogue.

Hecht was known from youth as a singer and elocutionist. She was a debutante in Norfolk in 1899, attended the Boston School of Oratory, and joined in local theatrical productions as a "dainty and extremely pretty" young woman.

== Career ==
During her first marriage, Blanche Consolvo, a contralto, sang in concerts with Frieda Hempel, Rosa Ponselle and May Peterson, and toured in the Southern states. She was first president of the Norfolk Opera Company, when it formed in 1914. She starred in the title role when the company produced Dolly Varden in 1915, as a charity fundraiser. Consolvo sang as a soloist with the Naval Port Band in Norfolk in 1917, at a send-off for American troops during World War I. She pursued further vocal training and experience in Italy in 1920. While in Italy, she met her second husband.

Sheet music for a marching song she composed, "Our Governor Elect" (1905), was dedicated to her close friend, Virginia congressman Claude A. Swanson, when he was running for governor.

== Personal life ==
Blanche Hecht eloped to marry widowed Roman Catholic businessman and entrepreneur Charles Herbert Consolvo (1871–1947) in 1902, in North Carolina. Her son Charles Swanson Consolvo was born in 1904. She divorced Consolvo in Reno in May 1922, and she married widower Augusto M. Cariaggi (1889–1970), an Italian count, in the same month, in New York. They had a later wedding in Italy in 1923. When C. H. Consolvo died, she successfully sued his estate for over $22,000. She died in 1961, in Norfolk.
