= 1938 Texas gubernatorial election =

- November 8, 1938
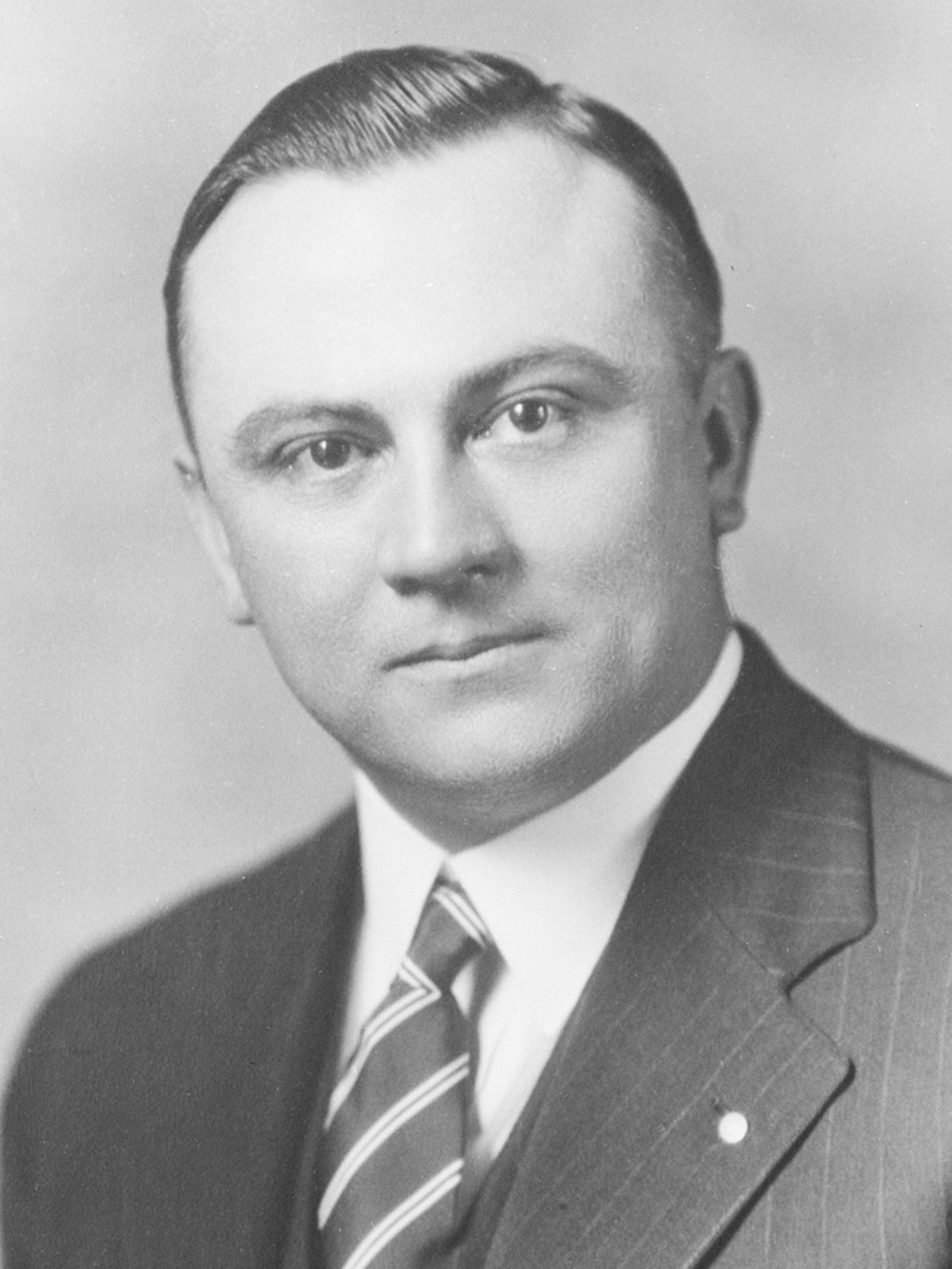

Nominee	W. Lee O'Daniel	Alexander Boynton
Party	Democratic	Republican
Popular vote	358,943	11,309
Percentage	96.84%	3.05%
- County results O'Daniel: 70–80% 80–90% >90% No votes
Governor before election
James V. Allred
Democratic
Elected Governor
W. Lee O'Daniel
Democratic

The 1938 Texas gubernatorial election was held on November 8, 1938.

Democratic politician W. Lee O'Daniel defeated Republican nominee Alexander Boynton with 96.84% of the vote.

== Nominations ==
=== Democratic primary ===
The Democratic primary election was won by O'Daniel by winning over 50% of the vote, and subsequently avoided a run-off.

==== Candidates ====
- S.T. Brogdon
- Carl A. Crowley
- Clarence E. Farmer
- James A. Ferguson, cousin of former Governor James E. Ferguson
- Tom F. Hunter, attorney.
- Joseph King
- Marvin P. McCoy
- William McCraw, incumbent Attorney General of Texas.
- Clarence R. Miller
- W. Lee O'Daniel, salesman and swing bandleader.
- P.D. Renfro
- Thomas Self
- Ernest O. Thompson, incumbent Railroad Commissioner

==== Results ====
Democratic primary results
Party	Candidate	Votes	%
Democratic	W. Lee O'Daniel	573,166	51.41
Democratic	Ernest O. Thompson	231,630	20.78
Democratic	William McCraw	152,278	13.66
Democratic	Tom F. Hunter	117,634	10.55
Democratic	Karl A. Crowley	19,153	1.72
Democratic	P.D. Renfro	8,127	0.73
Democratic	Clarence E. Farmer	3,869	0.35
Democratic	James A. Ferguson	3,800	0.34
Democratic	Marvin P. McCoy	1,491	0.13
Democratic	Thomas Self	1,405	0.13
Democratic	S.T. Brogdon	892	0.08
Democratic	Joseph King	773	0.07
Democratic	James A. Ferguson	667	0.06
Total votes		1,114,885	100.00

=== Republican nomination ===
The Republican state convention was held at Houston on August 9, 1938. Alexander Boynton, Houston oilman, was nominated for Governor.

== General election ==
=== Candidates ===
- W. Lee O'Daniel, Democratic
- Alexander Boynton, Republican
- Earl E. Miller, Socialist
- Homer Brooks, Communist

=== Results ===
1938 Texas gubernatorial election
Party	Candidate	Votes	%	±%
Democratic	W. Lee O'Daniel	358,943	96.84%	▲3.97
Republican	Alexander Boynton	11,309	3.05%	▼3.94
Socialist	Earl E. Miller	282	0.08%	▼0.03
Communist	Homer Brooks	207	0.06%	▲0.03
Total votes		370,741	100.00%	
Democratic hold				

== Bibliography ==
- Gubernatorial Elections, 1787-1997. Washington, D.C.: Congressional Quarterly Inc. 1998. ISBN 1-56802-396-0.
- Texas Almanac, 1954-1955. Dallas, Texas: A. H. Belo Corporation. 1953.
