= 1940 Texas gubernatorial election =

- July 27, 1940
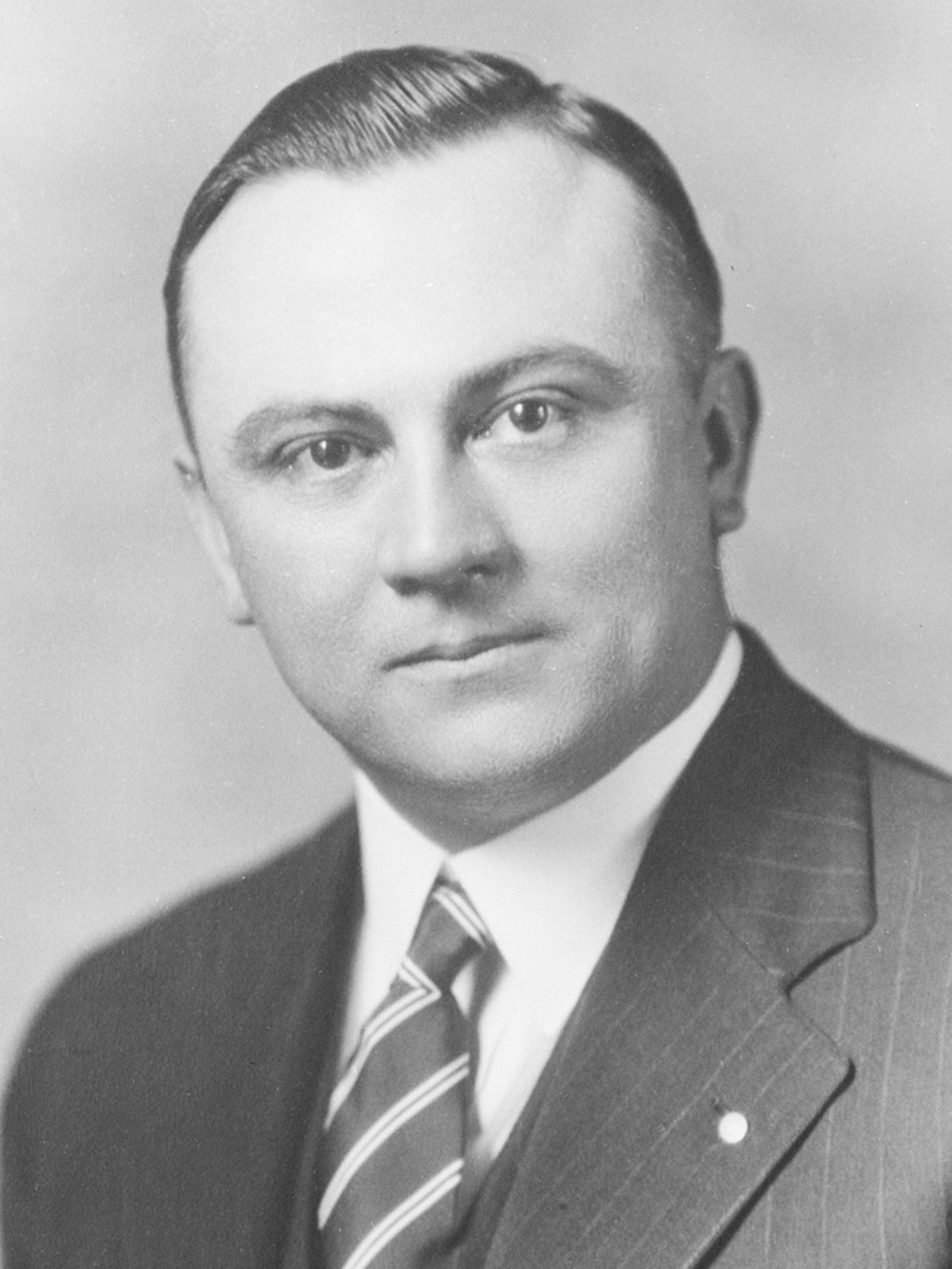

Nominee	W. Lee O'Daniel	George C. Hopkins
Party	Democratic	Republican
Popular vote	1,019,338	59,895
Percentage	94.42%	5.55%
- County results O'Daniel: 60–70% 70–80% 80–90% >90% No votes
Governor before election
W. Lee O'Daniel
Democratic
Elected Governor
W. Lee O'Daniel
Democratic

The 1940 Texas gubernatorial election was held on November 5, 1940. Incumbent Democratic Governor W. Lee O'Daniel defeated Republican nominee George C. Hopkins with 94.42% of the vote.

== Nominations ==
=== Democratic primary ===
The Democratic primary election was held on July 27, 1940. By winning over 50% of the vote, O'Daniel avoided a run-off.

==== Candidates ====
- Arlon Barton "Cyclone" Davis, son of James Harvey "Cyclone" Davis
- Miriam A. Ferguson, former Governor
- Harry Hines, incumbent Highway Commissioner
- W. Lee O'Daniel, incumbent Governor
- Jerry Sadler, incumbent Railroad Commissioner
- Ernest O. Thompson, incumbent Railroad Commissioner and unsuccessful candidate for Democratic nomination for Governor in 1938

==== Withdrawn ====
- R. P. "Rip" Condron, theater owner from La Feria (endorsed Thompson).
- Albert L. Derden, incumbent member of the Texas House of Representatives from Falls County (endorsed Hines).

==== Results ====
Democratic primary results
Party	Candidate	Votes	%
Democratic	W. Lee O'Daniel (incumbent)	645,646	54.29
Democratic	Ernest O. Thompson	256,923	21.60
Democratic	Harry Hines	119,121	10.02
Democratic	Miriam A. Ferguson	100,578	8.46
Democratic	Jerry Sadler	61,396	5.16
Democratic	Arlon B. Davis	3,623	0.31
Democratic	R. P. Condron	2,003	0.17
Total votes		1,189,290	100.00

=== Republican nomination ===
The Republican state convention was held at Beaumont on August 13, 1940. George C. Hopkins, businessman, was nominated for Governor.

== General election ==
=== Candidates ===
- W. Lee O'Daniel, Democratic
- George C. Hopkins, Republican
- Ben H. Lauderdale, Communist, nominee for Agriculture Commissioner in 1938

=== Results ===
1940 Texas gubernatorial election
Party	Candidate	Votes	%	±%
Democratic	W. Lee O'Daniel (incumbent)	1,019,338	94.42%	▼2.42
Republican	George C. Hopkins	59,895	5.55%	▲2.50
Communist	Ben H. Lauderdale	202	0.02%	▼0.01
Write-in		113	0.01%	N/A
Majority		959,443	88.87%	▼4.92
Total votes		1,079,538	100.00%	
Democratic hold				

== Bibliography ==
- Gubernatorial Elections, 1787-1997. Washington, D.C.: Congressional Quarterly Inc. 1998. ISBN 1-56802-396-0.
- Texas Almanac, 1954-1955. Dallas, Texas: A. H. Belo Corporation. 1953.
