= 1934 Texas gubernatorial election =

1934 Texas gubernatorial Democratic primary election
- July 28, 1934 (first round); August 25, 1934 (runoff)
- Turnout: 78.4% ▼ (first round); 75.1% ▼ (runoff) (Note: Turnout is based on the results of the previous Democratic Primary not the previous General Election.)
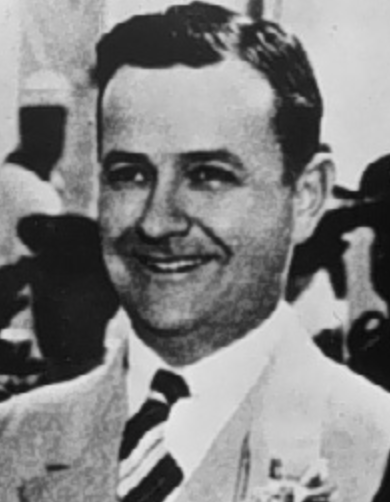

| Nominee | James Burr V Allred | Tom F. Hunter |
| Party | Democratic | Democratic |
| First round | 298,903; 29.88% | 243,254; 24.32% |
| Runoff | 499,343; 52.10% | 459,106; 47.90% |
- Allred: 20–30% 30–40% 40–50% 50–60% Hunter: 20–30% 30–40% 40–50% 50–60% 60–70% 70–80% Mcdonald: 10–20% 20–30% 30–40% 40–50% 50–60% 60–70% 70–80% 80–90% Small: 20–30% 30–40% 40–50% 50–60% 60–70% 70–80% 80–90% Witt: 30–40% Hughes: 20–30% Allred: 50–60% 60–70% 70–80% 80–90% Hunter: 50–60% 60–70% 70–80% >90%
Governor before election
Miriam A. Ferguson
Democratic
Elected Governor
James Burr V Allred
Democratic

The 1934 Texas gubernatorial election was held on November 6, 1934, in order to elect the governor of Texas. Democratic nominee and incumbent Attorney General of Texas James Burr V Allred defeated Republican nominee D. E. Waggoner in a landslide.

== Democratic primary ==
The Democratic primary election was held on July 28, 1934. As no candidate won a majority of votes, there was a run-off on August 25, 1934, between the two highest ranking candidates incumbent Attorney General of Texas James Burr V Allred and Tom F. Hunter. Allred would eventually win the primary with 52.10% against Hunter.

=== Candidates ===
- James Burr V Allred, incumbent Texas Attorney General
- Tom F. Hunter, attorney.
- C. C. McDonald, former Texas Secretary of State (1911–1912).
- Clint C. Small, former member of the Texas Senate.
- Edgar E. Witt, incumbent Lieutenant Governor of Texas
- Maury Hughes, former Chairman of the Texas Democratic State Executive Committee.
- Edward K. Russell, farmer and prohibition advocate

=== Results ===
1934 Democratic primary
| Party | Candidate | Votes | % |
|---|---|---|---|
| Democratic | James Burr V. Allred | 298,903 | 29.88% |
| Democratic | Tom F. Hunter | 243,254 | 24.32% |
| Democratic | C. C. McDonald | 207,200 | 20.71% |
| Democratic | Clint C. Small | 125,324 | 12.53% |
| Democratic | Edgar E. Witt | 62,476 | 6.24% |
| Democratic | Maury Hughes | 58,815 | 5.88% |
| Democratic | Edward K. Russell | 4,454 | 0.45% |
| Total votes | | 1,000,426 | 100.0% |

=== Runoff ===
1934 Democratic primary runoff
| Party | Candidate | Votes | % |
|---|---|---|---|
| Democratic | James Burr V. Allred | 499,343 | 52.10% |
| Democratic | Tom F. Hunter | 459,106 | 47.90% |
| Total votes | | 958,449 | 100.0% |

== Republican primary ==
The Republican primary election was also held on July 28, 1934. After Orville Bullington's strong performance against Miriam A. Ferguson in 1932 the party held its third primary in state history. D.E. Waggoner, a banker from Dallas, won the primary unopposed after the endorsement of the republican state executive committee.

=== Results ===
1934 Republican primary
| Party | Candidate | Votes | % |
|---|---|---|---|
| Republican | D.E. Waggoner | 13,043 | 100.0% |
| Total votes | | 13,043 | 100.0% |

== General election ==
The Socialist Party nominated George Clifton Edwards for a second consecutive time following his election loss in the 1932 Texas gubernatorial election. On election day, November 6, 1934, Democratic nominee James Burr V Allred won the election in a landslide by a margin of 415,031 votes against his foremost opponent Republican nominee D. E. Waggoner, thereby retaining Democratic control over the office of governor. Allred was sworn in as the 33rd governor of Texas on January 15, 1935.

=== Results ===
Texas gubernatorial election, 1934
| Party | Candidate | Votes | % |
|---|---|---|---|
| Democratic | James Burr V Allred | 428,734 | 96.44 |
| Republican | D. E. Waggoner | 13,703 | 3.08 |
| Socialist | George Clifton Edwards | 1,862 | 0.42 |
| Communist | Enoch Hardaway | 260 | 0.06 |
| Total votes | | 444,559 | 100.00 |
| Democratic hold | | | |
