= 1936 Texas gubernatorial election =

- November 3, 1936
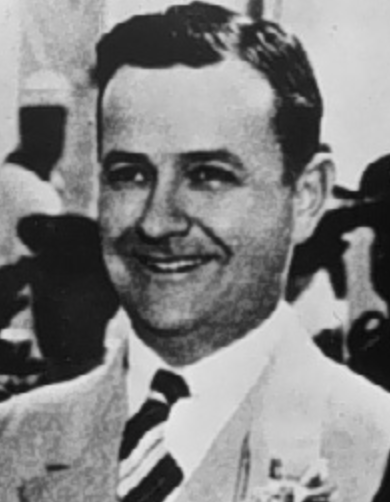

Nominee	James V Allred	C.O. Harris
Party	Democratic	Republican
Popular vote	782,083	58,842
Percentage	92.87%	6.99%
- County results Allred: 50–60% 60–70% 70–80% 80–90% >90% Harris: 50–60% No votes
Governor before election
James V Allred
Democratic
Elected Governor
James V Allred
Democratic

The 1936 Texas gubernatorial election was held on November 3, 1936.

Incumbent Democratic Governor James V Allred defeated Republican nominee C. O. Harris with 92.87% of the vote.

== Nominations ==
=== Democratic primary ===
The Democratic primary election was held on July 25, 1936. Allred received over 50% of the vote, avoiding a run-off.

==== Candidates ====
- James V Allred, incumbent Governor from Wichita County.
- P. Pierce Brooks, real estate broker from Dallas County.
- F. W. Fischer, attorney and oil well owner from Smith County.
- Tom F. Hunter, attorney from Wichita County.
- Roy Sanderford, president pro tempore of the Texas Senate from Bell County.

==== Results ====
Democratic primary results
Party	Candidate	Votes	%
Democratic	James V Allred	553,219	52.53
Democratic	Tom F. Hunter	239,460	22.74
Democratic	F. W. Fischer	145,877	13.66
Democratic	Roy Sanderford	81,170	7.71
Democratic	P. Pierce Brooks	33,391	3.17
Total votes		1,053,117	100.0%

== General election ==
=== Candidates ===
- James V Allred (Democratic), incumbent Governor from Wichita County.
- Charles O. "C. O." Harris (Republican), former judge from Tom Green County.
- Carl Brannin (Socialist)
- Homer Brooks (Communist)

=== Results ===
1938 Texas gubernatorial election
Party	Candidate	Votes	%	±%
Democratic	James V Allred	782,083	92.87%	▼3.64
Republican	C. O. Harris	58,842	6.99%	▲3.91
Socialist	Carl Brannin	962	0.11%	▼0.31
Communist	Homer Brooks	283	0.03%	▼0.03
Total votes		842,170	100.00%	
Democratic hold				

== Bibliography ==
- Gubernatorial Elections, 1787-1997. Washington, D.C.: Congressional Quarterly Inc. 1998. ISBN 1-56802-396-0.
- Texas Almanac, 1954-1955. Dallas, Texas: A. H. Belo Corporation. 1953.
