= Grover Sellers =

American politician

38th Attorney General of Texas
- In office 1943–1946
- Preceded by: Gerald Mann
- Succeeded by: Price Daniel

Personal details
- Born: November 20, 1892 Louisiana, U.S.
- Died: August 27, 1980 (aged 87) Sulphur Springs, Texas, U.S.
- Party: Democratic
- Spouse: Hazel
- Children: Clara Lee Sellers Mason and Helen Sellers Booker

Grover Sellers (November 20, 1892 – August 27, 1980) was the attorney general of Texas from 1944 to 1946.

== Early years ==
Sellers was born in Louisiana on November 20, 1892. He married his wife Hazel and had two daughters.

== Career ==
He was elected a Delegate to the 1928 Democratic National Convention from Texas.

In 1930, Sellers defeated Justice William Hodges in the Democratic Primary and was subsequently elected a Justice of the Sixth Court of Appeals in Texarkana. Reelected in 1936, Sellers resigned his office to become Attorney General of Texas.

He served one term as Attorney General, from 1944–1946. During his term of office, Heman Sweatt, a black man, applied for admission to The University of Texas Law School, which was then segregated for whites only. Sellers opposed Sweatt's admission, citing the "wise and long continued policy of segregation of races in the educational institutions of the state."

Sellers ran for Governor of Texas in the crowded Democratic Primary in 1946. He lost the primary to Beauford H. Jester, coming in third.

Later, he was appointed to the 12th Court of Appeals in Tyler. In 1964, Sellers was elected as a Delegate to the 1964 Democratic National Convention.

== Local dairy industry leaders ==
Judge Grover Sellers owned and operated one of the early Jersey Herds in Hopkins County on his farm in the Star Ridge Community. Sellers is considered one of the "moving forces" in bringing the dairy industry to Hopkins County.

== Death ==
Sellers died on August 27, 1980, in Sulphur Springs, Texas.

Party political offices
Preceded by Gerald Mann	Democratic nominee for Texas Attorney General; 1944	Succeeded by Price Daniel
Political offices
Preceded by Gerald Mann	Attorney General of Texas; 1944—1946	Succeeded by Price Daniel
