= Texas Department of Licensing and Regulation =

State agency of Texas

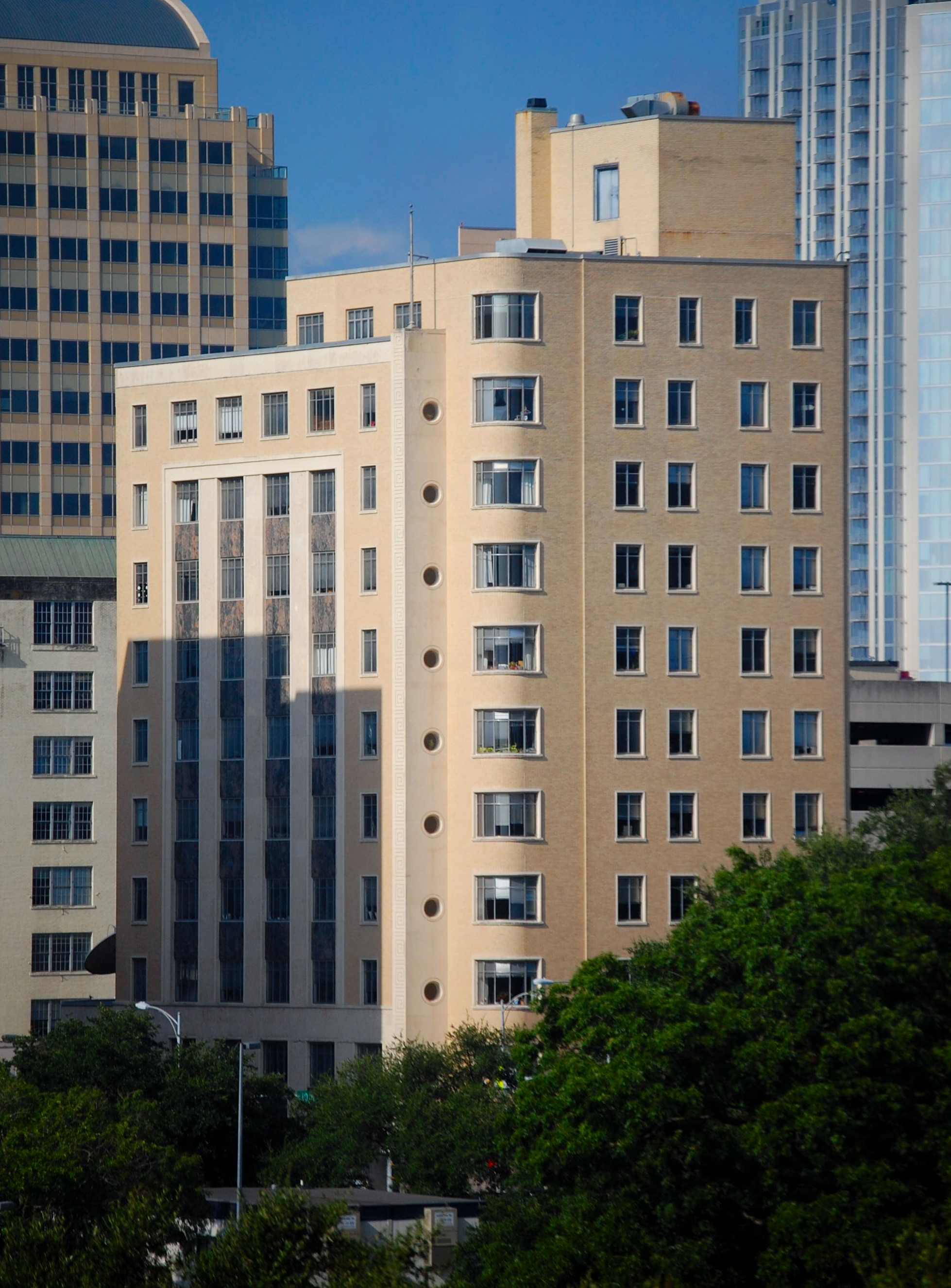
The E. O. Thompson State Office Building houses the headquarters of the TDLR

The Texas Department of Licensing and Regulation (TDLR) is a state agency of Texas.

TDLR is responsible for licensing and regulating a broad range of occupations, businesses, facilities, and equipment in Texas.

TDLR has its headquarters in the Ernest O. Thompson State Office Building in Downtown Austin.

== Occupations Licensed by TDLR ==
- Air Conditioning and Refrigeration
- Architectural Barriers (however, architects themselves are regulated by a separate professional board)
- Auctioneers
- Barbering
- Behavior Analysts
- Boiler Safety
- Combative Sports (i.e., boxing and mixed martial arts)
- Cosmetologists
- Dietitians
- Driver Education and Safety
- Dyslexia Therapists and Practitioners
- Electricians
- Elevator / Escalator Safety
- For-Profit Legal Services (however, the State Bar of Texas regulates attorneys)
- Hearing Instrument Fitters and Dispensers
- Industrialized Housing and Buildings
- Licensed Breeders
- Massage Therapists
- Midwives
- Orthotists and Prosthetists
- Podiatry
- Polygraph Examiners
- Property Tax Consultants
- Property Tax Professionals
- Service Contract Providers
- Speech-Language Pathologists and Audiologists
- Temporary Common Worker Providers
- Tow Trucks, Operators and Vehicle Storage Facilities
- Transportation Network Companies
- Used Automotive Parts Recyclers
- Vehicle Protection Product Warrantors
- Water Well Drillers and Pump Installers
- Weather Modification
