= Alvord, Texas =

- Town
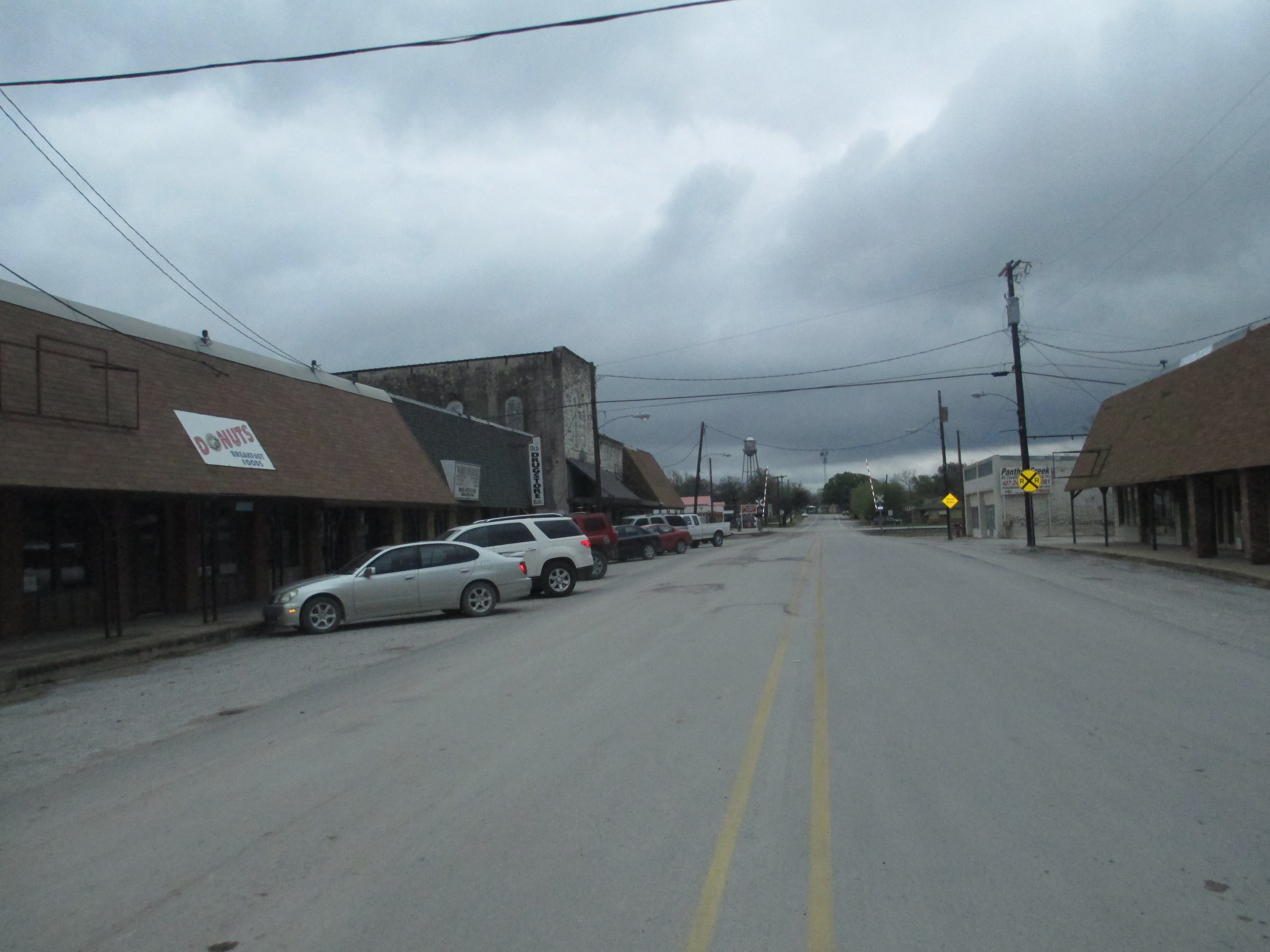
- Downtown Alvord

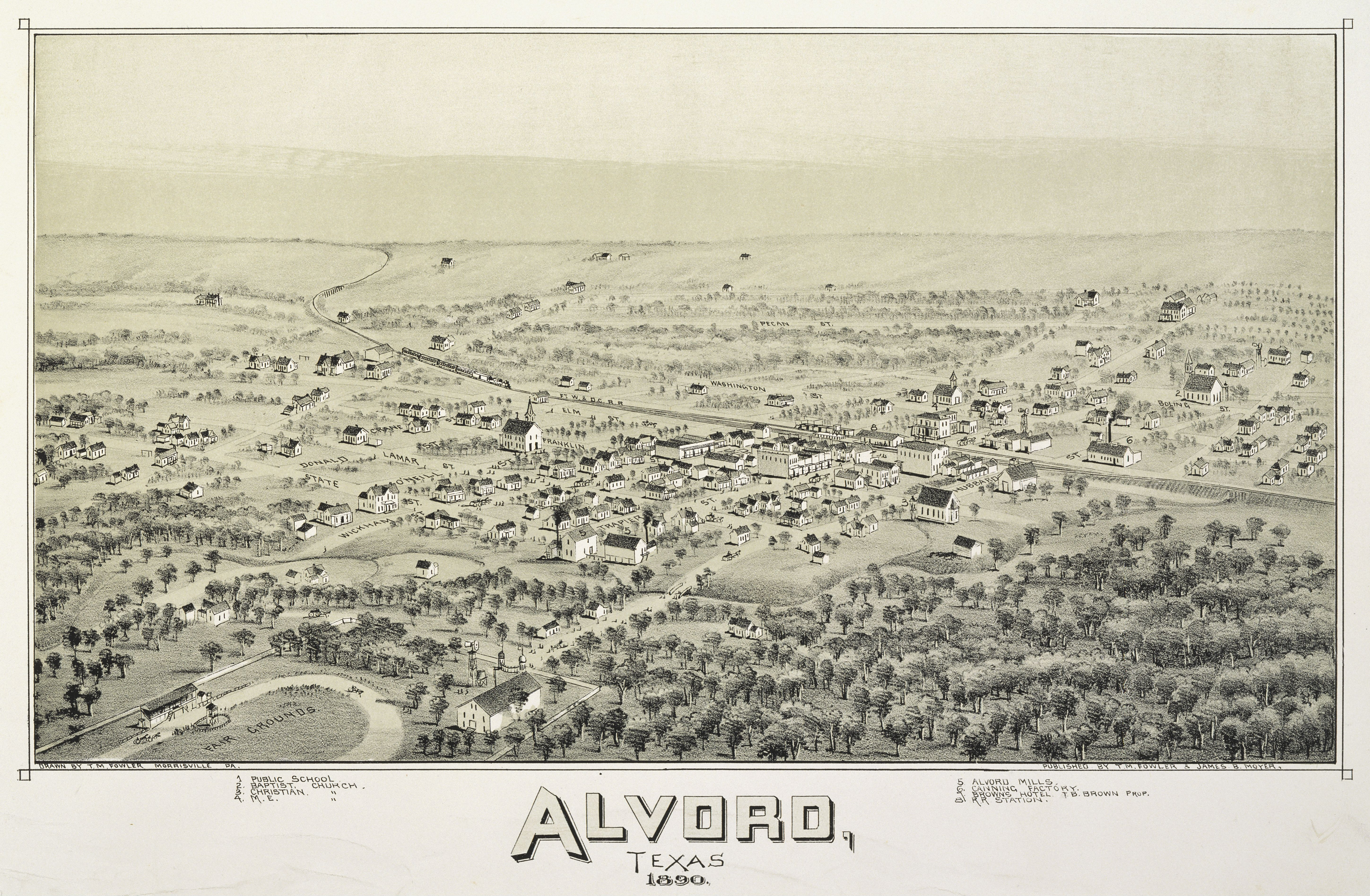
- Map of Alvord in 1890
- Interactive map of Alvord, Texas
- Coordinates: 33°21′25″N 97°41′46″W
- Country: United States
- State: Texas
- County: Wise
- Incorporated (town): February 22, 1912

Area
  - Total: 1.52 sq mi (3.94 km^{2})
  - Land: 1.52 sq mi (3.94 km^{2})
  - Water: 0 sq mi (0.00 km^{2})
- Elevation: 869 ft (265 m)

Population (2020)
  - Total: 1,351
  - Density: 888/sq mi (343/km^{2})
- Time zone: UTC-6 (Central (CST))
  - Summer (DST): UTC-5 (CDT)
- ZIP code: 76225
- Area code: 940
- FIPS code: 48-02284
- GNIS feature ID: 2412358

Alvord is a town in Wise County, Texas, United States. The population was 1,351 in 2020.

== History ==
Originally known as Nina, Alvord adopted its present name in 1882 in honor of the president of the Fort Worth and Denver Railway. There is no connection with the Arizona bandit Burt Alvord. A post office was established in 1882. By 1890, Alvord was a retail center for area farmers. In 1925, Alvord had 1,376 residents (42 more than in 2010), a high school, an elementary school, four churches, and a weekly newspaper. The Burlington Northern Railroad stopped there.

The population dropped during the Great Depression because of a decline in watermelon farms and cattle ranches. In 1940, the population totaled 821, with 35 businesses; in 1960, 720 people and 19 businesses; in 1990, 865 residents and 16 businesses. In 2000, the population was 1,007, with 62 businesses.

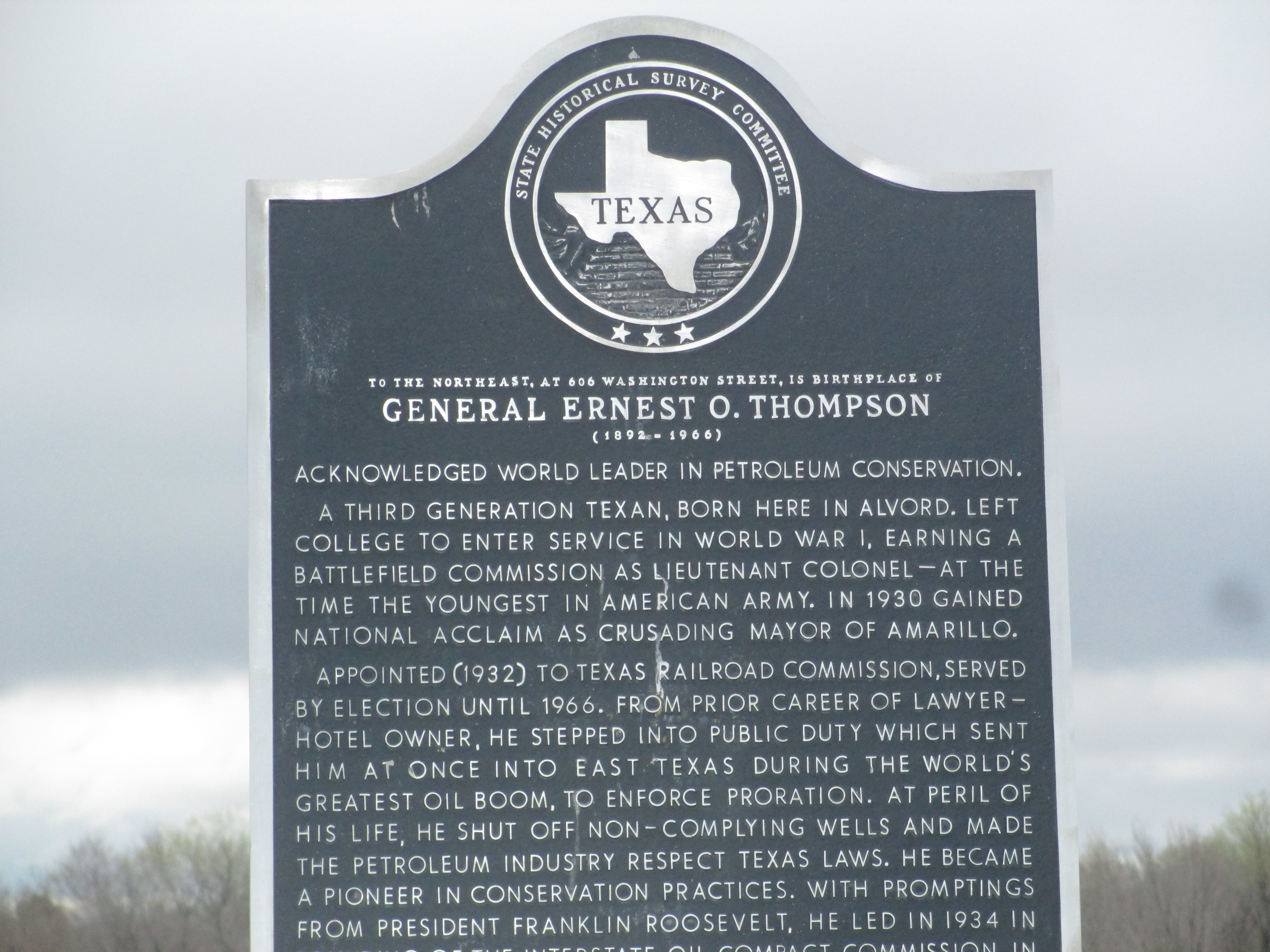
Ernest O. Thompson historical marker in his town of birth, Alvord, Texas

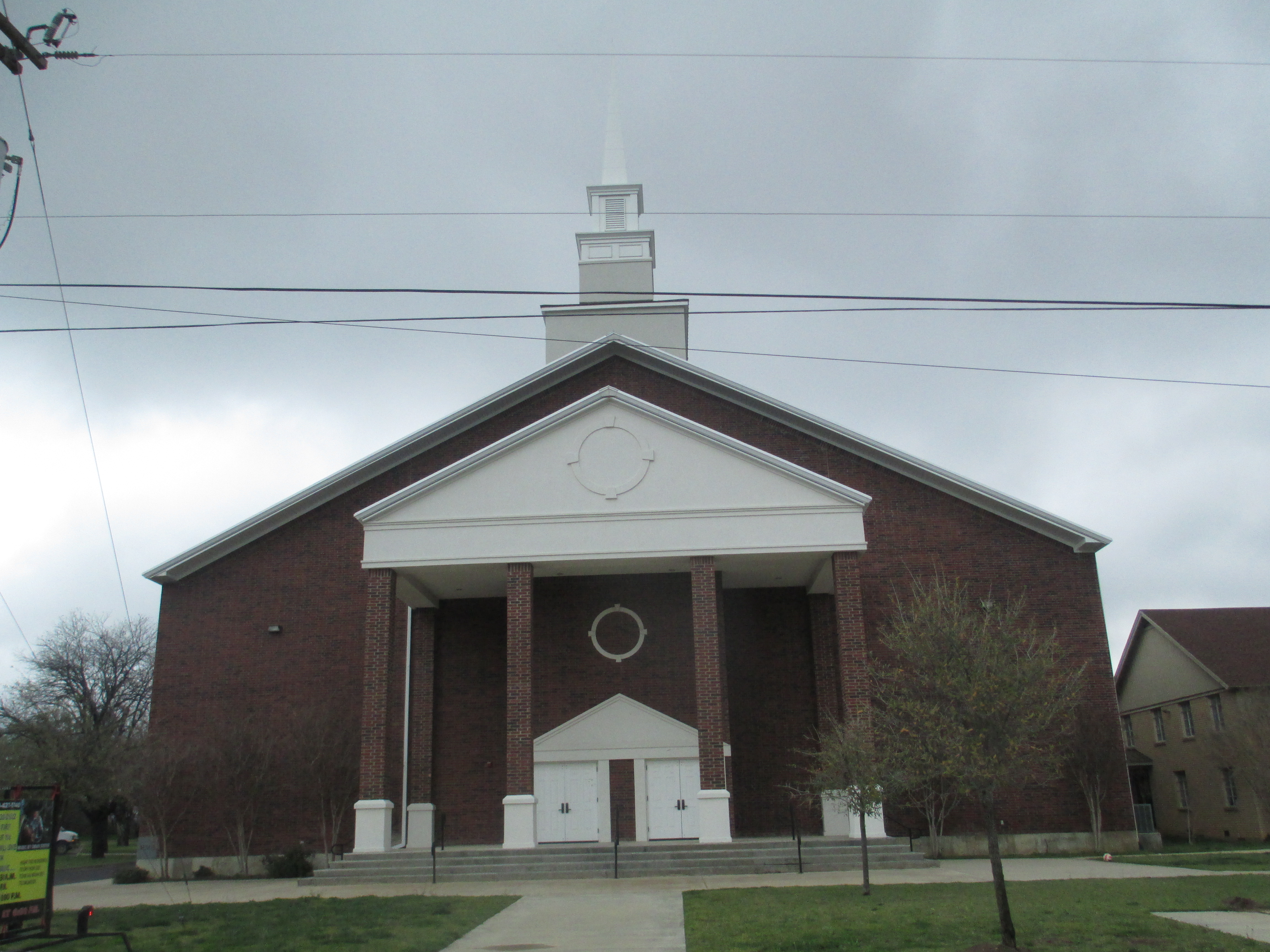
The First Baptist Church at 205 Boling St. in Alvord, pastor Bill Cleveland (2013)

== Geography ==
According to the United States Census Bureau, the town has a total area of 1.5 square miles (3.9 km^{2}), all land.

== Climate ==
The climate in this area is characterized by hot, humid summers and generally mild to cool winters. According to the Köppen Climate Classification system, Alvord has a humid subtropical climate, abbreviated "Cfa" on climate maps.

== Demographics ==
Historical population
| Census | Pop. | Note | %± |
|---|---|---|---|
| 1890 | 560 | | — |
| 1920 | 1,376 | | — |
| 1930 | 754 | | −45.2% |
| 1940 | 821 | | 8.9% |
| 1950 | 735 | | −10.5% |
| 1960 | 694 | | −5.6% |
| 1970 | 791 | | 14.0% |
| 1980 | 874 | | 10.5% |
| 1990 | 865 | | −1.0% |
| 2000 | 1,007 | | 16.4% |
| 2010 | 1,334 | | 32.5% |
| 2020 | 1,351 | | 1.3% |
U.S. Decennial Census

Alvord racial composition as of 2020 (NH = Non-Hispanic) (Note: Note: the US Census treats Hispanic/Latino as an ethnic category. This table excludes Latinos from the racial categories and assigns them to a separate category. Hispanics/Latinos can be of any race.)
| Race | Number | Percentage |
|---|---|---|
| White (NH) | 1,124 | 83.2% |
| Black or African American (NH) | 11 | 0.81% |
| Native American or Alaska Native (NH) | 15 | 1.11% |
| Asian (NH) | 6 | 0.44% |
| Mixed/Multi-Racial (NH) | 63 | 4.66% |
| Hispanic or Latino | 132 | 9.77% |
| Total | 1,351 | |

As of the 2020 United States census, there were 1,351 people, 359 households, and 254 families residing in the town.

== Notable person ==
Texas Railroad Commissioner Ernest O. Thompson, who also served as a mayor of Amarillo and became an expert on petroleum issues, was born in Alvord in 1892.
