= 1941 United States Senate special election in Texas =

- June 28, 1941
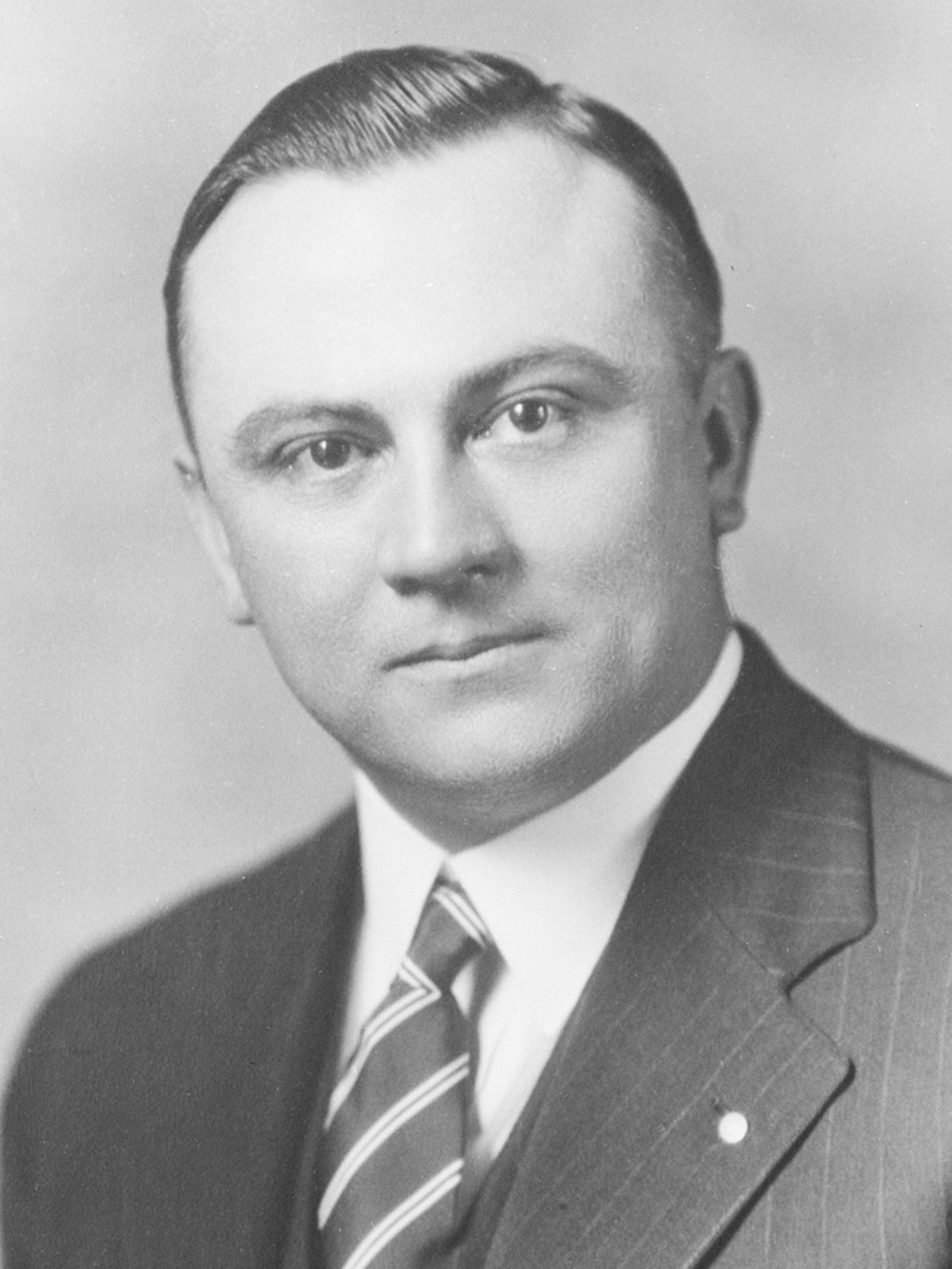

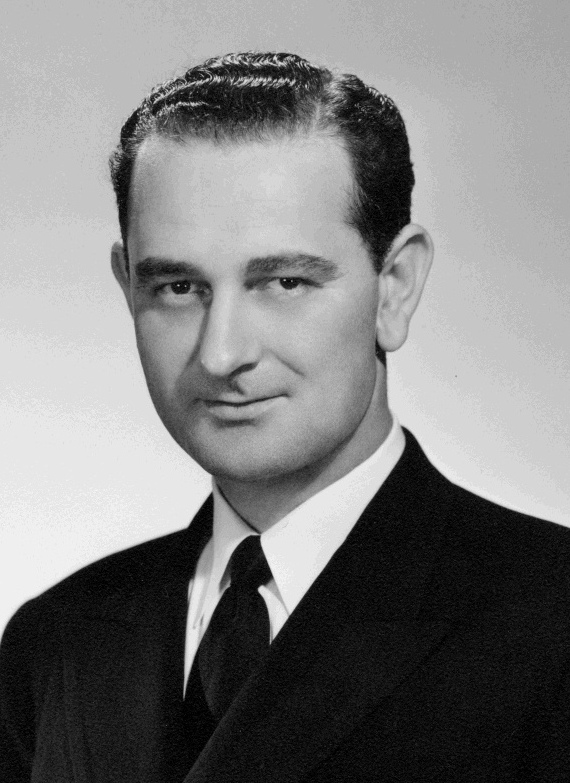

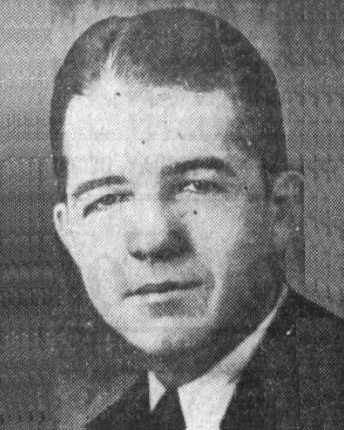

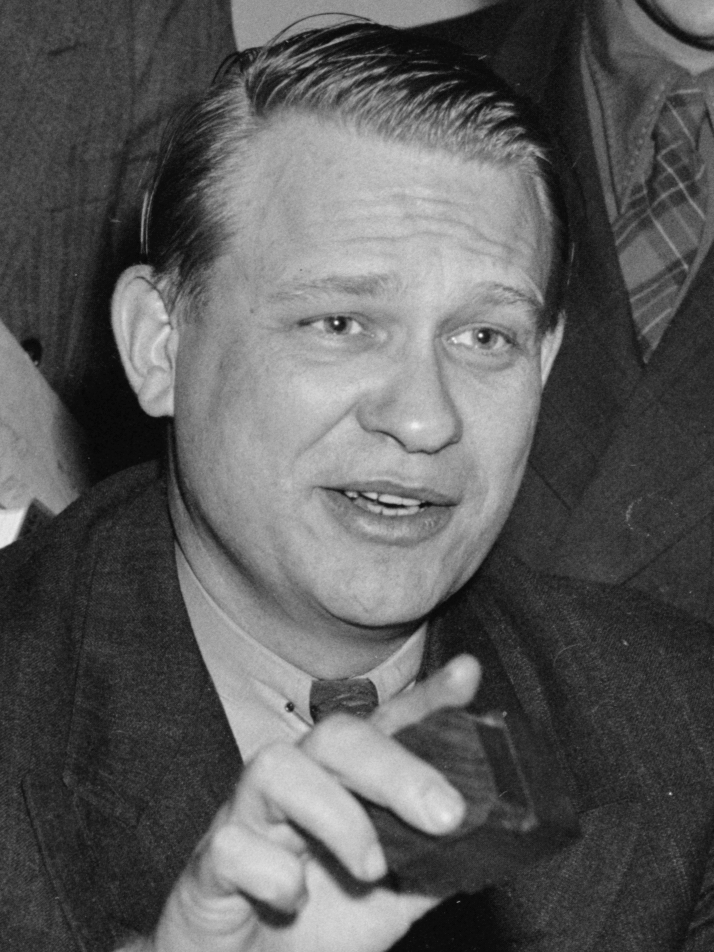
Nominee	Pappy O'Daniel	Lyndon B. Johnson
Party	Democratic	Democratic
Popular vote	175,590	174,279
Percentage	30.50%	30.27%
Nominee	Gerald Mann	Martin Dies Jr.
Party	Democratic	Democratic
Popular vote	140,807	80,551
Percentage	24.45%	13.99%
- O'Daniel: 20–30% 30–40% 40–50% 50–60% Johnson: 20–30% 30–40% 40–50% 50–60% 60–70% 70–80% >90% Mann: 20–30% 30–40% 40–50% 50–60% Dies: 20–30% 30–40% 40–50% 50–60% 60–70% 70–80%
U.S. senator before election
Andrew Jackson Houston
Democratic
Elected U.S. Senator
Pappy O'Daniel
Democratic

The 1941 United States Senate special election in Texas was held on June 28, 1941, to complete the unexpired term of Senator Morris Sheppard, who died in office on April 9. Interim Senator Andrew Jackson Houston did not run for re-election and died only two days before the election. The race was won by Governor Pappy O'Daniel with a plurality of the vote; no majority was required.

O'Daniel very narrowly defeated U.S. Representative Lyndon B. Johnson, who won the seat after O'Daniel's retirement in 1948.

== Background ==
In April 1941, incumbent Senator Morris Sheppard died in office. Governor Pappy O'Daniel appointed Andrew Jackson Houston to fill the seat until a successor could be duly elected, with the election scheduled for June 28. The winner finished Sheppard's term ending in 1943. Houston did not run to complete the term, only serving as a placeholder for Governor O'Daniel. He died in office only two days before the election.

== Candidates ==
=== Major candidates ===
- Martin Dies Jr., U.S. Representative from Lufkin and Chair of the House Un-American Activities Committee
- Lyndon B. Johnson, U.S. Representative from Gillespie County
- Gerald Mann, Attorney General of Texas
- Pappy O'Daniel, Governor of Texas

==== Minor candidates ====
None of these candidates received more than 0.30% of the popular vote.

- Joseph C. Bean
- John R. Brinkley
- Homer Brooks
- E. A. Calvin
- Arlon Barton "Cyclone" Davis
- Politte Elvins
- Guy B. Fisher
- Enoch Fletcher
- W. E. Gilliland
- A. E. Harding
- Basil Muse Hatfield
- Robert Grammer Head
- O.F. Heath Sr.
- Bubba Hicks
- W. R. Jones
- W. W. "Cap" King
- Starl G. Newsome Jr.
- Floyd E. Ryan
- Walter A. Schulz
- Charles L. Somerville
- Joe Thompson
- Edwin Waller III
- W. C. Welch
- John C. Williams

All of these candidates were Democrats except Elvins (Republican), Fletcher (Republican), Jones (Independent), and Brooks (Communist).

== Campaign ==
The first pre-election polls showed U.S. Representative Lyndon B. Johnson receiving only 5% of the vote, but Johnson ran a fierce campaign, barnstorming the state and emphasizing his close relationship with President Roosevelt.

On Election Day, Johnson held a strong lead in the returns throughout the whole night, and with 96 percent of the ballots counted, Johnson held a 5,000-vote lead. According to John Connally, future Governor and Johnson's campaign manager, local election officials began calling Connally's office and asking him about whether they should report the vote tallies. Connally told them to report the votes, which allegedly allowed O'Daniel's political allies among the South and East Texas party bosses to know the exact number of fraudulent votes needed for O'Daniel to catch up to Johnson. According to Connally,

The opposition then ‍—‌ Governor O'Daniel and his people ‍—‌ knew exactly how many votes they had to have to take the lead... They kept changing the results, and our lead got smaller and smaller and smaller. Finally, on Wednesday afternoon, we wound up on the short side of the stick and lost the election by 1,311 votes. I'm basically responsible for losing that 1941 campaign. We let them know exactly how many votes they had to have.

In addition to O'Daniel's allies, state business interests aligned with former impeached and convicted Texas Governor "Pa" Ferguson had been concerned with O'Daniel's support of prohibition as Governor; they believed that he could do much less damage to their cause in the Senate. The lieutenant governor, Coke R. Stevenson, was not in favor of prohibition, making his possible promotion to Governor a key selling point for the state's business interests in manipulating the election results. In the final vote tally, Johnson fell short by just 0.23% of the vote.

=== Allegations of fraud ===
In The Path to Power, Johnson biographer Robert Caro argues that the election results were manipulated in O'Daniel's favor by lobbyists from Texas' alcohol industry. O'Daniel was a staunch prohibitionist, and as Governor, he had proposed a bill preventing the sale of alcohol within ten miles of a military base; Caro notes how business interests feared the passing of this bill, as preparations for World War II had brought thousands of young soldiers into the region. To prevent the passing of this bill, lobbyists sought to elect O'Daniel to the Senate to place the "wet" lieutenant governor Coke Stevenson in the governorship, and hence rigged ballots in East Texas, swinging the election in O'Daniel's favor.

== Results ==
1941 U.S. Senate special election
Party	Candidate	Votes	%
Democratic	Pappy O'Daniel	175,590	30.50%
Democratic	Lyndon B. Johnson	174,279	30.27%
Democratic	Gerald Mann	140,807	24.45%
Democratic	Martin Dies Jr.	80,551	13.99%
Various	Minor candidates	4,559	0.79%
Total votes		575,786	100.00%

== See also ==
- 1941 United States Senate elections
