= William McCraw =

American lawyer

William C. McCraw

Attorney General of Texas
- In office January, 1935 – January, 1939
- Preceded by: James V. Allred
- Succeeded by: Gerald Mann

Personal details
- Born: August 15, 1896 Arlington, Texas, U.S.
- Died: November 8, 1955 (aged 59) Dallas, Texas, U.S.
- Resting place: Grove Hill Memorial Park

Military service
- Allegiance: United States of America
- Branch/service: United States Army
- Rank: Lieutenant Colonel
- Commands: SS Rebecca Lukens
- Battles/wars: World War I; World War II

William C. McCraw (August 15, 1896 – November 8, 1955) was the attorney general of Texas from 1935 to 1939. He previously served as the district attorney of Dallas County.

== Biography ==
McCraw was elected District Attorney of Dallas County. When he resigned, he joined his friend Tom C. Clark in forming the law firm of Clark and McCraw. Clark served as McCraw's campaign manager when he received the Democratic nomination and was elected Attorney General of Texas in 1934. He served two terms. During his tenure as Attorney General he petitioned the United States Supreme Court unsuccessfully for Texas to take a share of the estate of Edward Howland Robinson Green who had lived for many years in Terrell, Texas.

In 1938, McCraw ran for Governor as the more conservative candidate against W. Lee "Pappy" O'Daniel, but lost the Democratic Primary.

While he was Attorney General of Texas, McCraw owned and flew an airplane over Texas "as casually as he would drive a car." Having logged 1800 flying hours, he was called to active duty with the Army Air Corps in World War II.

From 1944 to 1945, McCraw was commanding officer of the Liberty Ship Major General Herbert A. Dargue, as part of the classified project "Ivory Soap." Ivory Soap was a secret project to put aircraft repair shops close to the battlefields of the Pacific. http://www.usmm.org/felknorivory.html The ship saw action in Saipan and Iwo Jima. It was credited with shooting down 1 1/2 Betties (Japanese bombers). Major General Herbert A. Dargue returned from its successful mission to Mobile Alabama on 11-Dec-1945 under the command of Colonel McCraw.

Party political offices
Preceded by James V. Allred	Democratic nominee for Texas Attorney General; 1934, 1936	Succeeded by Gerald Mann
Political offices
Preceded by James V. Allred	Attorney General of Texas; 1935—1939	Succeeded by Gerald Mann
