= May Peterson Thompson =

American opera singer (1880–1952)

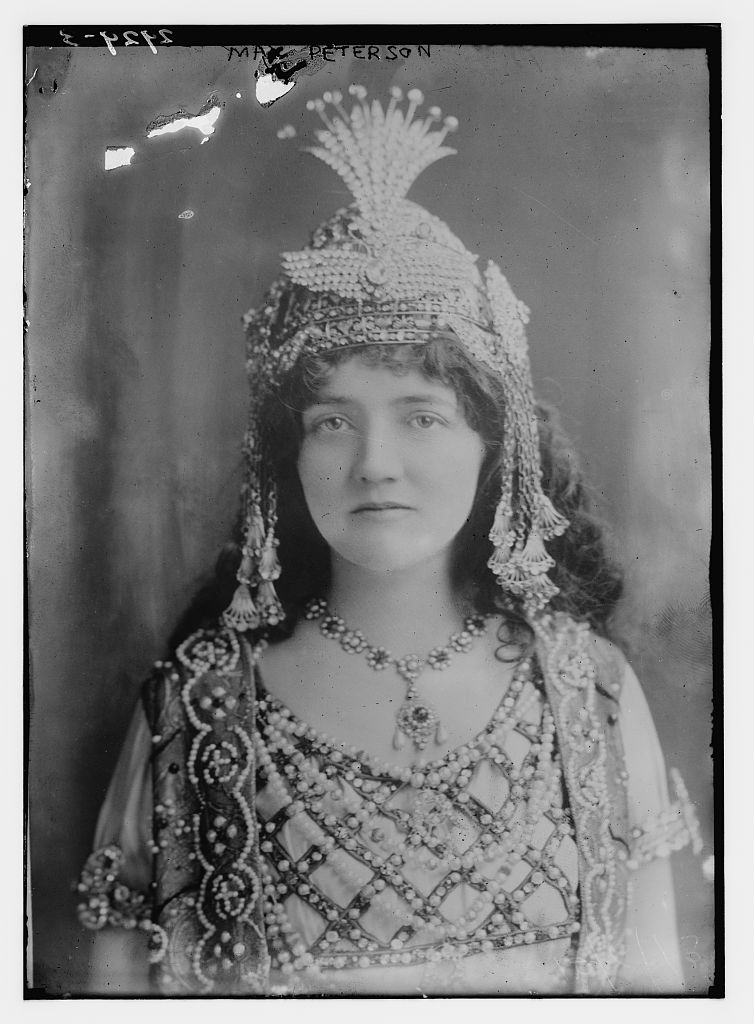
- Peterson c. 1913
- Born: May Esther Peterson; October 7, 1880; Oshkosh, Wisconsin, U.S.
- Died: October 8, 1952 (aged 72); Austin, Texas, U.S.
- Resting place: Texas State Cemetery, Austin, Texas, U.S.
- Education: Music Conservatory
- Occupation: Opera singer
- Spouse: Ernest O. Thompson (m. 1924)

May Esther Peterson Thompson (October 7, 1880 – October 8, 1952) was an American opera singer for the Metropolitan Opera Company.

== Biography ==
She was born on October 7, 1880, in Oshkosh, Wisconsin as May Esther Peterson. She was one of nine children of a Methodist minister. She began singing in 1884 at church meetings and later joined with her sister, Clara Peterson, an organist, to give recitals and concerts. She studied at The Music Conservatory of Chicago College of Performing Arts and in 1917 joined the Metropolitan Opera Company. She debuted as Micaëla in Carmen on November 29, 1917. She toured Europe with Frederick Delzell (piano) and sang with Opéra-Comique in Paris.

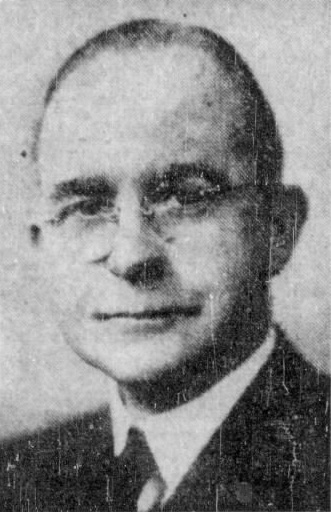
Ernest O. Thompson

She married Ernest O. Thompson on June 9, 1924, in Bronxville, New York. Afterward they traveled to Amarillo, Texas to a reception held in the ballroom of the Amarillo Hotel, which Thompson owned and had built. She retired from the Metropolitan Opera Company after her marriage, but she continued doing concert tours. In 1932, after her husband was appointed to the Railroad Commission of Texas, they moved to Austin, Texas. On October 1, 1952, she had a cerebral hemorrhage at their summer house in Estes Park, Colorado, and she was in a coma. She was flown back to Austin, where she died at the Seton Infirmary on October 8, 1952, never regaining consciousness. She was buried in the Texas State Cemetery in Austin.

== See also ==
- The May Esther Peterson Thompson Collection at Southwestern University
