= W. Lee O'Daniel =

American politician (1890–1969)

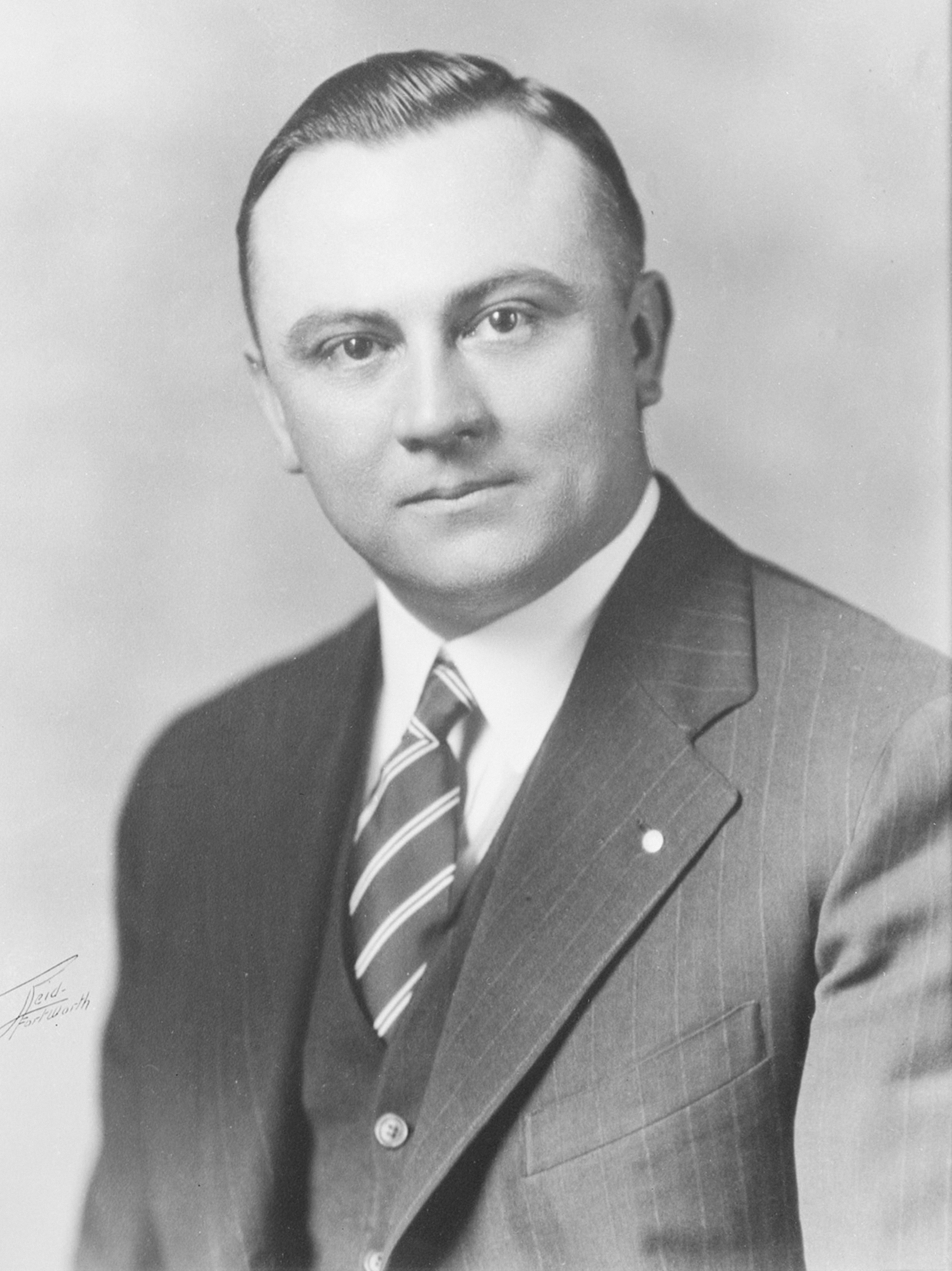
- O'Daniel c. 1938

United States Senator from Texas
- In office August 4, 1941 – January 3, 1949
- Preceded by: Andrew Jackson Houston
- Succeeded by: Lyndon B. Johnson

34th Governor of Texas
- In office January 17, 1939 – August 4, 1941
- Lieutenant: Coke R. Stevenson
- Preceded by: James V. Allred
- Succeeded by: Coke R. Stevenson

Personal details
- Born: Wilbert Lee O'Daniel; March 11, 1890 Malta, Ohio, U.S.
- Died: May 11, 1969 (aged 79) Dallas, Texas, U.S.
- Resting place: Sparkman-Hillcrest Memorial Park Cemetery, Dallas, Texas
- Party: Democratic
- Spouse: Merle Estella Butcher
- Profession: Musician; politician

Wilbert Lee "Pappy" O'Daniel (March 11, 1890 – May 11, 1969) was an American Democratic Party politician from Texas, who came to prominence by hosting a popular radio program. Known for his populist appeal and support of Texas's business community, O'Daniel served as the 34th governor of Texas (1939–1941) and later its junior United States senator (1941–1949). O'Daniel chose not to run for reelection to the Senate in 1948 and was succeeded by his 1941 Democratic primary opponent and future U.S. president Lyndon B. Johnson.

O'Daniel was also a songwriter who composed "Beautiful Texas".

== Early life ==
O'Daniel was born in Malta, Ohio. His father was killed in an accident while O'Daniel was a boy, and his mother remarried. The family moved to a cattle ranch near Arlington, Kansas. O'Daniel attended local schools and graduated from the two-year program at Salt City Business College in Hutchinson, Kansas. In 1909 he relocated to Anthony, Kansas to become a stenographer and bookkeeper for a flour milling company. After time with companies in Kansas City, Missouri and New Orleans, in 1925 he began to work for the Burrus Mill flour company in Fort Worth.

== Radio fame ==
In the late 1920s, O'Daniel assumed responsibility for the Burrus company's radio advertising. To that end, he wrote songs, sang, and hired a group of musicians to form an old timey band to back his vocals. Originally called the Light Crust Doughboys, notable musicians such as Bob Wills got their start with O'Daniel. After the Doughboys split up, O'Daniel formed the Western swing band Pat O'Daniel and his Hillbilly Boys. The new group was named after O'Daniel's own Hillbilly Flour Company. O'Daniel also hosted a regular noontime radio show heard statewide, which gave him his nickname after a catchphrase used frequently on air – "pass the biscuits, Pappy" – and propelled him into the public spotlight. By the mid-1930s, "Pappy" O'Daniel was a household name in Texas. As a national magazine reporter wrote at the time: "At twelve-thirty sharp each day, a fifteen-minute silence reigned in the state of Texas, broken only by mountain music, and the dulcet voice of W. Lee O'Daniel." The show extolled the values of Hillbilly brand flour, the Ten Commandments and the Bible.

== Political career ==
=== Governor ===
In 1938, he ran for governor of Texas as a Democrat. O'Daniel's campaign hailed his flour and the need for pensions and tax cuts. He promised to block a sales tax and raise pensions. O'Daniel won the Democratic primary election with 51 percent of the ballots over twelve opponents. In office, he seemingly went against his campaign promise by proposing a new transaction tax, which was voted down by the Texas Legislature. Despite this position change, he remained personally popular and handily won re-election in 1940. In both elections, his main competition came from Texas Railroad commissioner Ernest O. Thompson, the former mayor of Amarillo.

=== U.S. Senate ===
O'Daniel ran for the United States Senate in the 1941 special election following the death of Morris Sheppard. He defeated Lyndon Johnson by 1,311 votes in one of the most controversial elections in state history. As a result of this experience, in the 1948 election, Johnson prepared for a close runoff by arranging for his supporters who controlled votes, including George Parr, to withhold their final tallies until the statewide results were announced. As a senator, O'Daniel was ineffective, and most of his legislation was defeated. He endorsed the anti-Roosevelt Texas Regulars in the 1944 presidential election. Elected to a full term in 1942, O'Daniel refused to run for another term in 1948.

== Later career ==
After leaving the Senate, O'Daniel bought a ranch near Fort Worth. He invested in real estate in Dallas and was also active in the insurance business.

O'Daniel ran for governor in 1956 and 1958 and claimed that the Brown v. Board of Education decision was part of a Communist conspiracy. He finished third in the Democratic primaries both times. After failing to win the Democratic nomination in 1958, O'Daniel accepted the nomination of the small right-wing Constitution Party, but he did not appear on the general election ballot due to the state's "sore loser" law.

== Death and burial ==
O'Daniel died in Dallas on May 11, 1969. He was buried at Sparkman-Hillcrest Memorial Park Cemetery in Dallas.

== In popular culture ==
The 2000 Coen Brothers film O Brother, Where Art Thou? featured a character played by Charles Durning and named Governor Pappy O'Daniel, loosely based on the real O'Daniel, though set in Mississippi.

Party political offices
Preceded by James V. Allred	Democratic nominee for Governor of Texas; 1938, 1940	Succeeded by Coke R. Stevenson
Preceded by Morris Sheppard	Democratic nominee for U.S. Senator from Texas (Class 2); 1941, 1942	Succeeded by Lyndon B. Johnson
Political offices
Preceded by James V. Allred	Governor of Texas; January 17, 1939 – August 4, 1941	Succeeded by Coke R. Stevenson
U.S. Senate
Preceded by Andrew J. Houston	U.S. Senator (Class 2) from Texas; 1941–1949	Succeeded by Lyndon B. Johnson
