= James V. Allred =

American politician and judge (1899–1959)

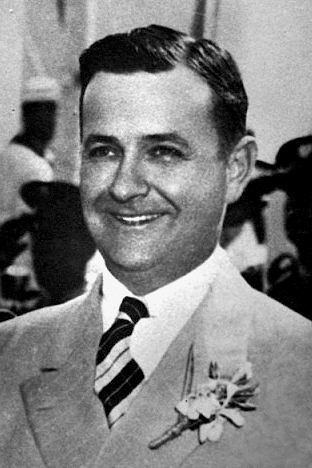
- Allred in 1937

Judge of the United States District Court for the Southern District of Texas
- In office October 13, 1949 – September 24, 1959
- Appointed by: Harry S. Truman
- Preceded by: Seat established
- Succeeded by: Reynaldo Guerra Garza
- In office February 23, 1939 – May 14, 1942
- Appointed by: Franklin D. Roosevelt
- Preceded by: Seat established
- Succeeded by: Allen Burroughs Hannay

33rd Governor of Texas
- In office January 15, 1935 – January 17, 1939
- Lieutenant: Walter Frank Woodul
- Preceded by: Miriam A. Ferguson
- Succeeded by: W. Lee O'Daniel

35th Attorney General of Texas
- In office January 1931 – January 1935
- Governor: Ross S. Sterling
- Preceded by: Robert L. Bobbitt
- Succeeded by: William McCraw

Personal details
- Born: James Burr V. Allred; March 29, 1899 Bowie, Texas, U.S.
- Died: September 24, 1959 (aged 60) Laredo, Texas, U.S.
- Party: Democratic
- Spouse: Josephine Elizabeth Miller (m. 1927)
- Children: 3; including Dave
- Education: Rice University; Cumberland University (LLB)

James Burr V. Allred (Note: Like the "S" in Harry S. Truman's name, the "V" was Allred's entire middle name, not an abbreviation for a longer name. The Texas State Historical Association and its Handbook of Texas does not put a dot after the "V" in his name for this reason, although most sources do (including sources published during his lifetime), and the Chicago Manual of Style recommends to include the dot after such single-letter names for the sake of consistency.) (March 29, 1899 – September 24, 1959) was the 33rd governor of Texas from 1935 to 1939. He later served, twice, as a United States district judge of the United States District Court for the Southern District of Texas.

== Early life ==
Born on March 29, 1899, in Bowie, Texas, the son of Renne Allred Sr. and Mary Magdalene (Henson), Allred graduated from Bowie High School in 1917. He enrolled at Rice Institute (now Rice University) but withdrew for financial reasons. He then served with the United States Immigration Service. Allred served in the United States Navy from 1918 to 1919. In 1921, he received a Bachelor of Laws from Cumberland School of Law (then part of Cumberland University, now part of Samford University).

== Career ==
=== Law ===
Allred began a private law practice in Wichita Falls, Texas, in 1921. From 1923 to 1926, he served as district attorney in the city. He returned to private practice in 1926 before becoming Attorney General of Texas in 1931.

=== Governor of Texas ===
Allred was elected Governor of Texas in the 1934 gubernatorial election and served until 1939. He was an ardent Democrat and supporter of the New Deal policies of President Franklin D. Roosevelt.

=== District court ===
Allred received a recess appointment to the United States District Court for the Southern District of Texas on July 11, 1938, but he declined the appointment.

On January 5, 1939, President Franklin D. Roosevelt nominated Allred to the United States District Court for the Southern District of Texas, to a new seat authorized by 52 Stat. 584. He was confirmed by the United States Senate on February 16, 1939, and received his commission on February 23, 1939. His service ended on May 15, 1942, due to his resignation.

Allred was an unsuccessful candidate for the United States Senate from Texas in 1942. He then returned to private practice in Houston, Texas, from 1943 to 1949.

Allred was nominated by President Harry S. Truman on September 23, 1949, to the United States District Court for the Southern District of Texas, to a new seat authorized by 63 Stat. 493. He was confirmed by the United States Senate on October 12, 1949, and received his commission on October 13, 1949.

== Death ==
During a court session on September 24, 1959, Allred called recess at 11:00 a.m. due to feeling ill. He entered Mercy Hospital in Laredo, Texas, where he died at 4:50 p.m. from a coronary occlusion. His funeral, held at Wichita Falls Christian Church on September 28, 1959, was visited by Governor Price Daniel, Senate Majority Leader Lyndon B. Johnson, Senator Ralph Yarborough, Representative Homer Thornberry, and former Governor Dan Moody.

== Legacy ==
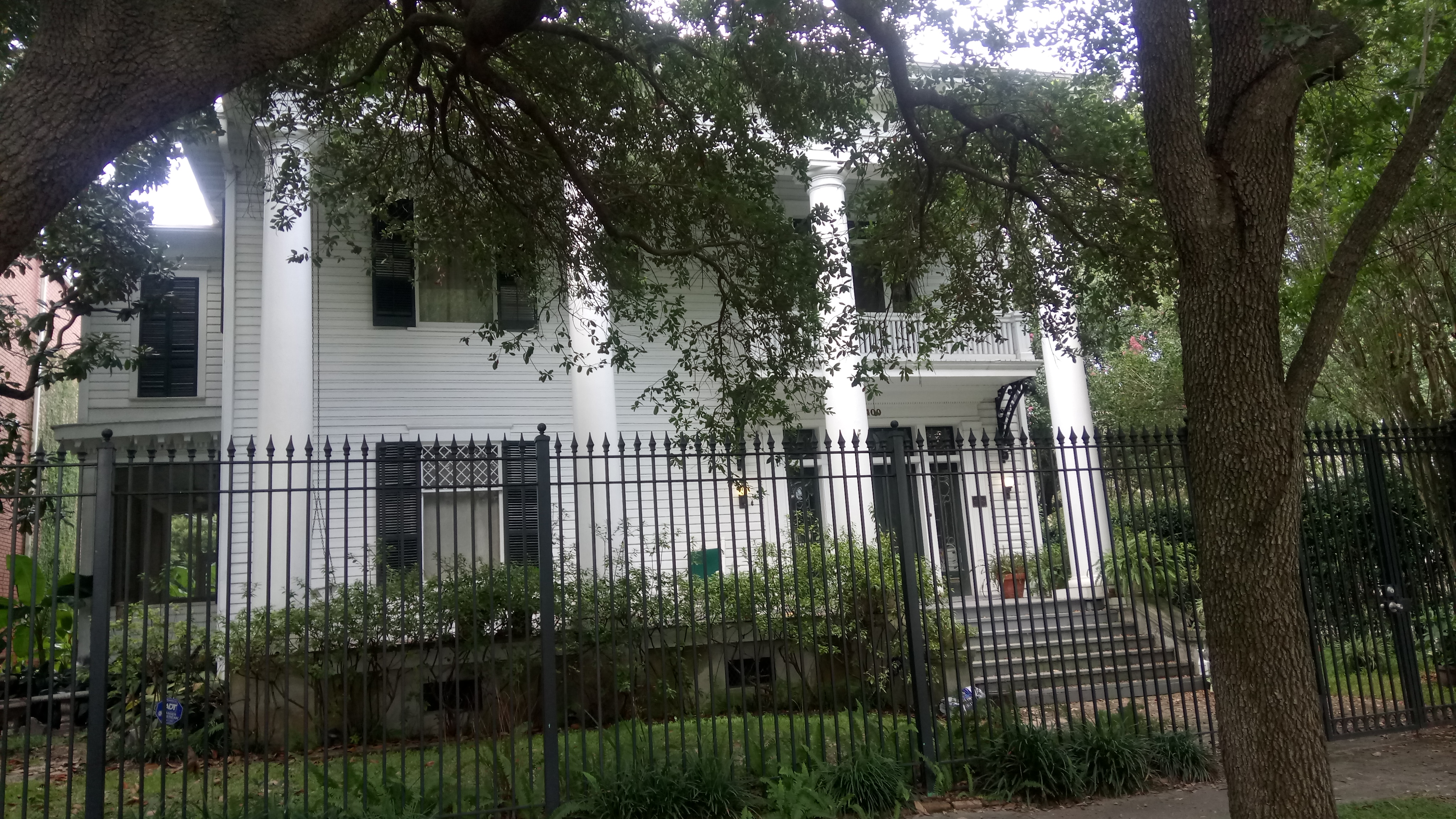
The Allred House in Westmoreland, Houston, where he lived in 1939–1940

The James V. Allred Unit, a Texas Department of Criminal Justice (TDCJ) state prison for men in Wichita Falls, Texas, is named for Allred.

== Sources ==
- "Ex-Governor Allred Dies After Seizure". The Dallas Morning News, September 25, 1959, sec. I, p. 1.
- "Fiery Allred Got Into Politics Early". The Dallas Morning News, September 25, 1959, sec. I, p. 3.
- "James V. Allred of U.S. Bench, 60; Federal Judge for South Texas Dies – Served Two Terms as Governor, '35–39". The New York Times, September 25, 1959. (Subscription required for access to full article.)
- "Joe Betsy Allred, widow of former governor, dies". The Dallas Morning News, June 9, 1993, p. 30A.

Party political offices
Preceded by Claude Pollard	Democratic nominee for Texas Attorney General; 1930, 1932	Succeeded by William McCraw
Preceded by Miriam A. Ferguson	Democratic nominee for Governor of Texas; 1934, 1936	Succeeded by W. Lee O'Daniel
Political offices
Preceded by Miriam A. Ferguson	Governor of Texas; 1935–1939	Succeeded by W. Lee O'Daniel
Legal offices
Preceded by Robert L. Bobbitt	Attorney General of Texas; 1931–1935	Succeeded by William McCraw
New seat	Judge of the United States District Court for the Southern District of Texas; 1939–1942	Succeeded by Allen Burroughs Hannay
New seat	Judge of the United States District Court for the Southern District of Texas; 1949–1959	Succeeded by Reynaldo Guerra Garza
