= Kittrell =

Kittrell may refer to:

== Places ==
- Kittrell, North Carolina
- Kittrell, Tennessee
- Kittrell, Texas

== Houses ==
- Kittrell House in Texarkana, Arkansas
- Kittrell-Dail House in Pitt County, North Carolina

== People with the surname Kittrell ==
- Christine Kittrell (1929–2001) American R&B singer
- Flemmie Pansy Kittrell (1904–1980) first American black woman to earn a Ph.D. in home economics
- Pleasant Williams Kittrell (1805–1867) American physician, politician, and planter
- Jean Kittrell, American jazz pianist, vocalist
- Steve Kittrell (born 1948) American college baseball coach

== Others ==
- Kittrell College in Kittrell, North Carolina
