= Nancy Moffette Lea =

Mother-in-law of Sam Houston

Nancy Moffette Lea (1780–1864) was the mother of Margaret Lea Houston and mother-in-law of Sam Houston. She was an integral member of the Houston family, running the household when Margaret was ill or pregnant. She is believed to have helped her son-in-law convert and be baptized in 1854. In appreciation, she donated a bell to the Independence Baptist Church in honor of him. The wife of Temple Lea, she inherited an estate from her family that she managed. She purchased a cotton plantation which was operated by 50 enslaved people.

== Early years ==
Born in Spartanburg, South Carolina, on May 1, 1780, Nancy Moffette was the daughter of Henry and Margaret Moffette. The family moved to Hancock County, Georgia, in 1797. Her parents moved to Perry County, Alabama, one year after their daughter Nancy and son-in-law, and died there in 1829.

== Marriage and children ==
Miss Moffette was married to Temple Lea on October 8, 1797, becoming Nancy Moffette Lea. They were married in Hancock County, Georgia. Temple was born around 1780, the son of George Lea and Lucy Talbert of Virginia.

In 1819, the Leas moved to Perry County, Alabama, east of Marion, Alabama. They lived on a farm on Goose Creek, east of Cahaba River, and around one to two miles from Sprott, Alabama.

Together they had six children who survived their childhood and one child who died young. Their children were:

1. Martin A. Lea (b. Jun 26, 1799)
2. Varilla Lea (Nov. 17, 1801–Dec. 22, 1881) married Robert Royston in Alabama Oct. 8, 1817
3. Henry Gabriel Lea (b. Oct 7. 1804)
4. Adaline Lea (b. March 26, 1808)
5. Wallace Lea (b. Sep. 11, 1811)
6. Margaret Lea “Peggy” (April 11, 1819–1867 Texas) married Gen. Sam Houston
7. Vernal B. Lea married Catherine Jones (widow of William Goodall with one child, Anne)
8. Emily Antoinette Lea (b. Feb. 10, 1822) married Charles Powers

As an example of the Lea's approach to education, their daughter Margaret was educated at home and then attended outside schools, including the Judson Institute for females in Marion, Alabama and Pleasant Hill Seminary. She studied literature, Latin, and music, including guitar, piano, harp, and voice classes.

Temple was a founding member of the Perry County Colonization Society, with the mission to send free black people to a colony in Africa. Her husband died January 28, 1834, in Marion, Perry County, Alabama. His daughter Margaret, still a girl, received the slightly younger 12 year-old Joshua in her father's will.

Nancy moved into the house of her son Henry, who was a state legislator and businessman, with Vernal, Margaret, and Antoinette. He built the Lea–Thatcher House at 302 Green Street in what is now the Green Street Historic District of Marion, Alabama, which is listed on the National Register of Historic Places.

Lea, was a wealthy woman, went to Mobile, Alabama, in 1839 to visit her newly married daughter Antoinette Lea Bledsoe and her husband William Bledsoe. After selling her plantation, she wished to discuss potential real estate investments in the West. Margaret traveled with Lea to visit her sister, who held a garden party where Margaret met Sam Houston. Martin Lea, her son, invited Houston to the Bledsoes so that Houston could discuss investments in land in Texas with Lea.

Margaret and Houston became close and when he asked to marry her, Margaret agreed. Lea objected. She found Houston "insufficiently religious, too old, divorced, and a drinker." Lea and the Bledsoes arrived in Galveston prior to their marriage, which Lea insisted would occur in her home in Alabama and not in the wilderness of Texas. The couple married on May 9, 1840, in Marion, Alabama at her brother's house, now called the Lea-Thatcher House.

== Slaves owned by the Leas ==
It is likely that enslaved people lived in one-room cabins with a fireplace and dirt floor. They had a simple diet of breads made of corn, greens, and a bit of pork. The Leas did not believe in whipping slaves.

Enslaved people shared what they learned about the news of the day from people from other plantations and other visitors. On Sundays, the Leas observed the Sabbath and only the most necessary chores were performed. Lea included servants in morning and evening Bible readings. Leisure time was spent taking care of their personal chores, fishing, hunting, and tending their own gardens. Story-telling was enjoyed by people of all ages.

Five year old children likely worked a number of chores, including carrying water, gathering firewood, milking cows, and tending to animals. It is also likely that they would sweep the yard and tend to babies in the nursery. At ten years of age, children worked in the fields and developed skills like toolmaking, caring for equipment, and grooming horses.

=== Temple's will of 1834 ===
In his will, Temple left:

- To Vernal, Jim and his wife Nancy and their children Franky and Bob.
- To Margaret, he left Vianna, Eliza, Charlotte and the boy Joshua.
- To Antoinette, Lulian, Martha, Silvy, and child Tom (or Torra)
- To his wife Nancy, Dinah, Polly, Polly's child Jet, and the child Bingley
- To Virilla and her husband R.R. Royalton, Sophia - to be equal with his other married children who already received slaves

Other enslaved people and other property, such as household furnishings, stock, and other property were to be managed by Lea until their youngest child became of age or was married.

=== Eliza ===
Young Eliza lived in the Tidewater region of Virginia when she was lured from the plantation by a white man who offered her and her friends a buggy ride. They ended up on an auction block and she was purchased by Temple Lea. His daughter Margaret and Eliza became very close. Eliza was a cook on the Lea plantation. Eliza was one of the four people that Margaret inherited from her father. She went with Margaret to Texas and became part of the Houston household. Appreciated for her cooking skills, she also managed the work of Vianna and Charlotte.

=== Joshua ===
Joshua was born about 1822 in Marion, Alabama, likely at the Lea plantation. He was owned by Temple Lea until his death in 1834, when he was inherited by Margaret Lea, who was just a few years older than Joshua. Joshua would have worked in the vegetable, sugar cane, and cotton fields; harvested fruit; repaired equipment; and tended to animals. He was an intelligent young man who learned several trades. After Margaret Lea and Sam Houston married in 1840, Joshua went with them to Galveston, Texas, where they stayed initially with Lea, who had a house there by that time. By that time, Joshua had two children—Joe and Lucy—with an enslaved woman named Anneliza. (Note: Anneliza may have been Anneliza Wynne. The Wynnewood plantation of the Wynne family was located near the Lea plantation in Alabama. The Wynnes moved to Huntsville, as did the Houstons. Anneliza is buried near her son Joe Houston and her husband Wharton Halyard. Annelizza had another child with Joshua after he moved to Texas. Joshua had more children with other women after Anneliza's three children.)

=== Vianna ===
Vianna was the oldest enslaved person that was inherited by Margaret. The others were Charlotte, Eliza, and Joshua, who she likely looked after. Vianna died in February 1848 of pneumonia, having been with the Leas for almost 20 years.

=== Other slaves ===
Charlotte, about the same age as Joshua, was held by the Leas as long as Joshua could remember.

Lea brought Polly, Jet, Bingley, and Dinan with her when she moved to Galveston. She inherited them from Temple after his death. Of African descent, they were required by an ordinance of Galveston, a large slave market, to register with the mayor's office. It was common for black people to be kidnapped from the streets and sold at the slave auction.

== Religion ==
Temple was a lay minister. They were among the first members of the Siloam Baptist Church. Religion was important to Lea. When the Baptist State Convention of Alabama organization was established in 1823, she was the only female delegate. Lea and her daughter Margaret joined the Galveston Baptist Church in 1841.

Lea is said to have influenced Houston's decision to join the Baptist Church at Independence, Texas, which she joined when she moved to the town in 1852. Houston converted and was baptized in the church in 1856. A bell was cast in 1856 for the church with $500 that she received from the sale of her silverware. It was cast by the Meneely Foundry in New York. It is made of tin and copper for a soft tone. The bell was hung in a tower near the church's cemetery. In 1969, it was broken in a fall from the belfry. It is now on display in the church building, which is now the Texas Baptist Historical Center Museum. A historical marker is located at the site. It states that she donated the bell in appreciation of Houston's religious conversion.

She donated $1,000 (equivalent to $34,996 in 2024) to the Foreign Mission Board of the Southern Baptist Convention for Bibles.

== Inheritance ==
Lea received an inheritance from the Moffettes, which she invested in a cotton plantation with 50 slaves. The earnings supported the family while Temple Lea was away from home preaching the Baptist faith.

== Texas ==
In the fall of 1839, Lea visited Texas and rented a house in Galveston. Following Margaret's marriage in Alabama, Margaret suffered from asthma and other health problems as the result of the heat and the pollen of Texas. Margaret decided to stay in Galveston with her mother while Houston traveled across the state. They wrote letters to stay in touch with one another. Margaret began preparing their home in Cedar Point, one of many residences the Houstons would inhabit. Margaret disliked mundane duties and she was often ill and pregnant, so Lea helped run her household. She worked alongside Aunt Eliza to tend to the Houston's children and manage the household duties.

Her son Vernal also decided to move to Texas. Lea lived with Antoinette Lea and William Bledsoe at their sugar plantation in Grand Cane until she heard that Margaret was having a difficult pregnancy. Lea arrived by stagecoach in Washington-on-the-Brazos in December 1842 to take her back to the more civilized Grand Cane to care for Margaret during her pregnancy. Houston was unhappy to be left in Washington-on-the-Brazos. Lea stated "You may have conquered Santa Anna, but you will never conquer me," referring to Antonio López de Santa Anna. The baby was born in Washington-on-the-Brazos. Houston had become very drunk and went to Great Cane to confess to his wife. She returned with him, as did Lea.

Lea provided food for the family and bought a cow to keep baby Sam Jr. nourished when Margaret had a breast tumor, which embarrassed Houston. Lee said that although he could starve for his country, Sam Jr. was “not old enough to undergo... Valley Forge" (of the Revolutionary War). Houston was managing a war with Mexican troops. They arrived at a bargain, Lea would buy the food necessary for the family and Houston would reimburse her out of his salary. Lea, Margaret, and Sam Jr. spent the summer of 1843 with Antoinette and William Bledsoe at Grand Cane.

For a time, Lea raised Virginia Thorn, whose parents had died of yellow fever. She was the adopted daughter of her son Vernal and his wife. She took in the eight-year-old girl after Vernal was widowed. The Houstons later took the girl in, but Houston found the girl to be troublesome and warned Margaret to be watchful of the girl.

She moved to Huntsville in 1847 with the Houstons. By 1848 or in 1852, she moved to Independence. By 1850, Lea traveled between the homes of her children's families in Texas and Alabama. The Houstons had settled in Huntsville and the Bledsoes lived in Grand Cane. She visited "not so much as a guest but as a more of a commanding matriarch who raised her banner for a time in her currently designated flagship". Her son Vernon (Vernal) lived at Council Hill about 14 miles from the Houston's Raven Hill estate. Houston met with delegations of Alabama Native Americans there. A commemorative plaque acknowledges the significance of these meetings at Coldspring, Texas. In 1852, Lea's son Henry died in Alabama. Into 1854, Lea had become morbid, talking every day of death. She oversaw the construction of her tomb in Independence. Her granddaughter by Antoinette died of pneumonia.

After Houston's death, Margaret moved to Independence in 1864 and lived next to her mother's house.

== Death ==
Lea died on February 7, 1864. She was interred in Independence at the Houston-Lea Family Cemetery, which is located across the street from the Independence Baptist Church.

== Sources ==
- Haley, James L. (2002). Sam Houston. Norman : University of Oklahoma Press. ISBN 978-0-8061-3405-5.
- Mungall, Elizabeth Cary (2018). The Dama Gazelles: Last Members of a Critically Endangered Species. Texas A&M University Press. ISBN 978-1-62349-612-8.
- Prather, Patricia Smith (1993). From slave to statesman : the legacy of Joshua Houston, servant to Sam Houston. Denton, Texas: University of North Texas Press. ISBN 978-0-929398-47-1.
- Seale, William (1992) [1970]. Sam Houston's Wife: A Biography of Margaret Lea Houston. University of Oklahoma Press. ISBN 978-0-8061-2436-0.
