= Steamboat House (Huntsville, Texas) =

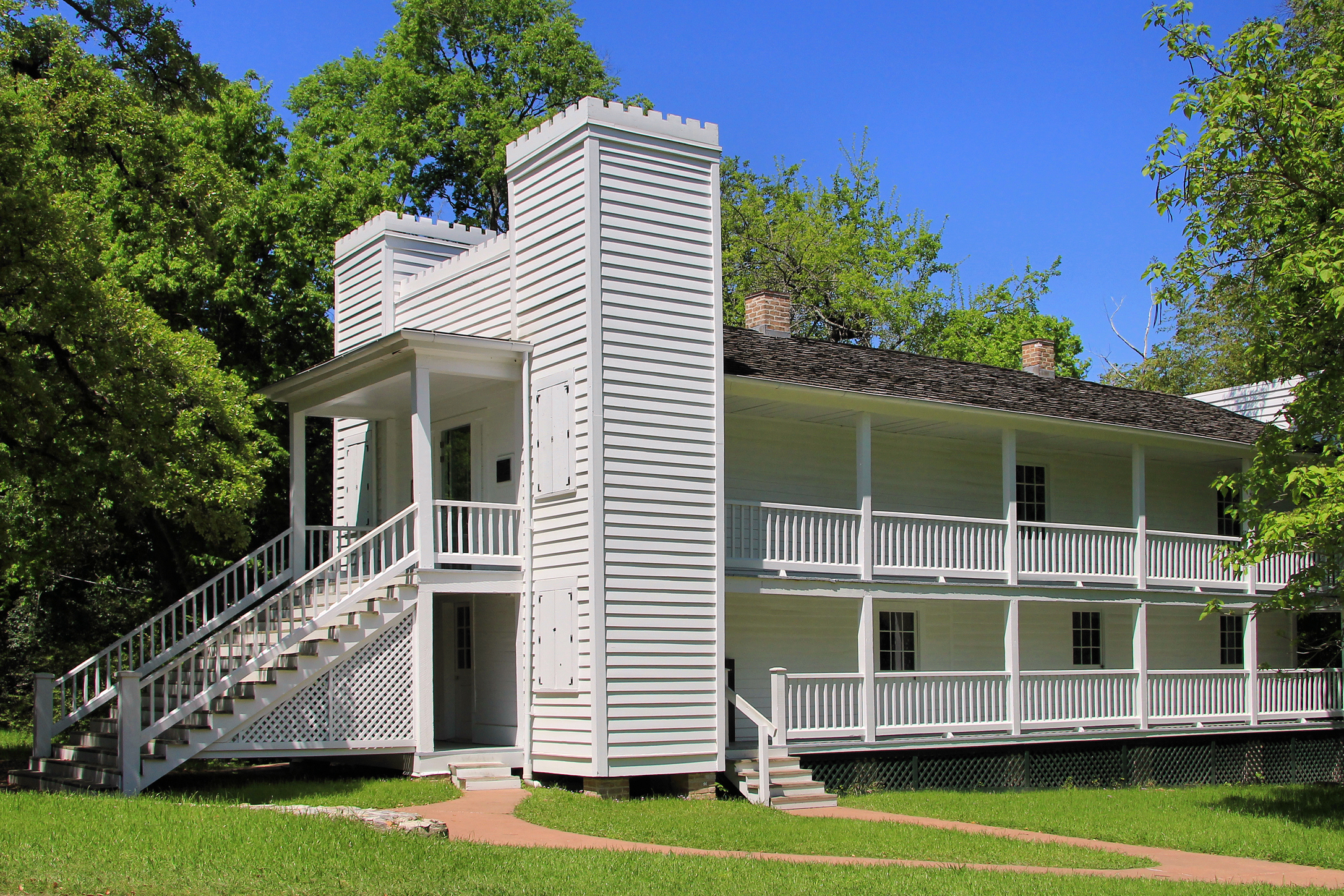

- Location within Texas Steamboat House (the United States)
- Interactive map showing the location of Steamboat House
- Location: Huntsville
- Coordinates: 30.71447°N 95.55358°W
- Type: House museum
- Website: Sam Houston Memorial Museum

Steamboat House is located at Sam Houston State University, in the city of Huntsville, county of Walker, in the U.S. state of Texas.

== History ==
Rufus W. Bailey built the house in 1858 as a wedding gift for his son, but the couple refused to live in it because of its unusual architecture, which caused the locals to give it the nickname "steamboat". It is the house where Sam Houston died July 26, 1863. Houston's funeral was held in the upstairs parlor. The house is part of the Sam Houston Memorial Museum complex. Bailey died shortly before Houston, and the house was inherited by his son Frank.

The house was sold to A. C. McKeen, who sold it to Pleasant Williams Kittrell in 1866. Kittrell died in 1867 as the result of the same yellow fever epidemic that claimed the life of Margaret Lea Houston. The house had numerous owners, until it was purchased in 1933 by businessman J. E. Josey, who deeded it to the Texas Historical Commission.

The house was moved to the grounds of the university in 1936. It was designated a Recorded Texas Historic Landmark in 1964.
