= Tom Blue =

Former enslaved man (deceased 1910)

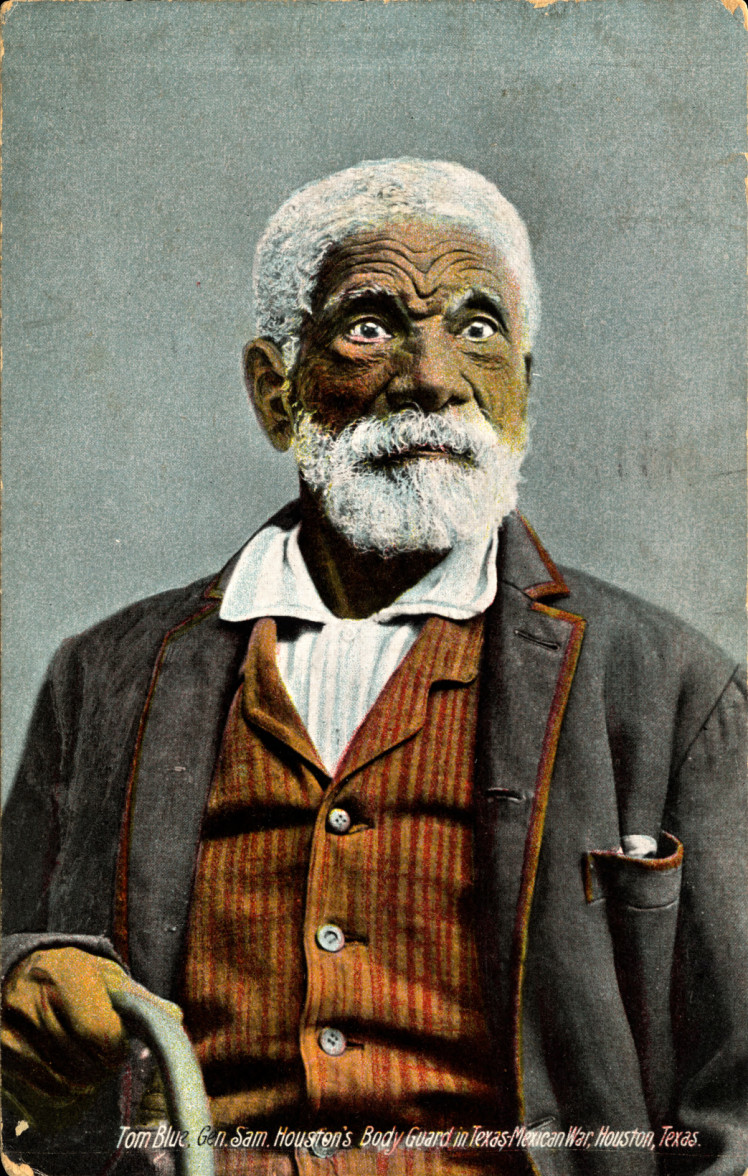
Tom Blue, enslaved by General Sam Houston, ran away and joined the Mexican military

Tom Blue (died 1910) was an enslaved personal servant and coachman of Sam Houston, who purchased Blue prior to his marriage to Margaret Lea. He worked for Houston for nearly 30 years. In the fall of 1862, he ran away with another servant, a boy named Walter Hume. They traveled together to the border and Blue sold Hume for $800. Blue crossed into Mexico, where he lived as a free man. He later settled in Harrisburg, where he married a woman who was around age 30. He said at the time that he was 119.

== Early life ==
Tom Blue, of West Indian and European descent, was born in Pennsylvania between 1790 and 1817. (Note: Blue claimed to have been 119 years old when he married in 1909 (meaning he was born around 1790), he was said to have been born in Pennsylvania in 1791, and he has said that he was born in 1796. He was said to be 90 years of age in 1899 (born 1809) and was also said to have been at least 93 at the time of his death (born 1817 or earlier).) He was enslaved in Kentucky and ran away in 1832. Blue lived in Houston, Texas "when the stars fell" (Great Meteor Storm of 1833).

== Sam Houston ==
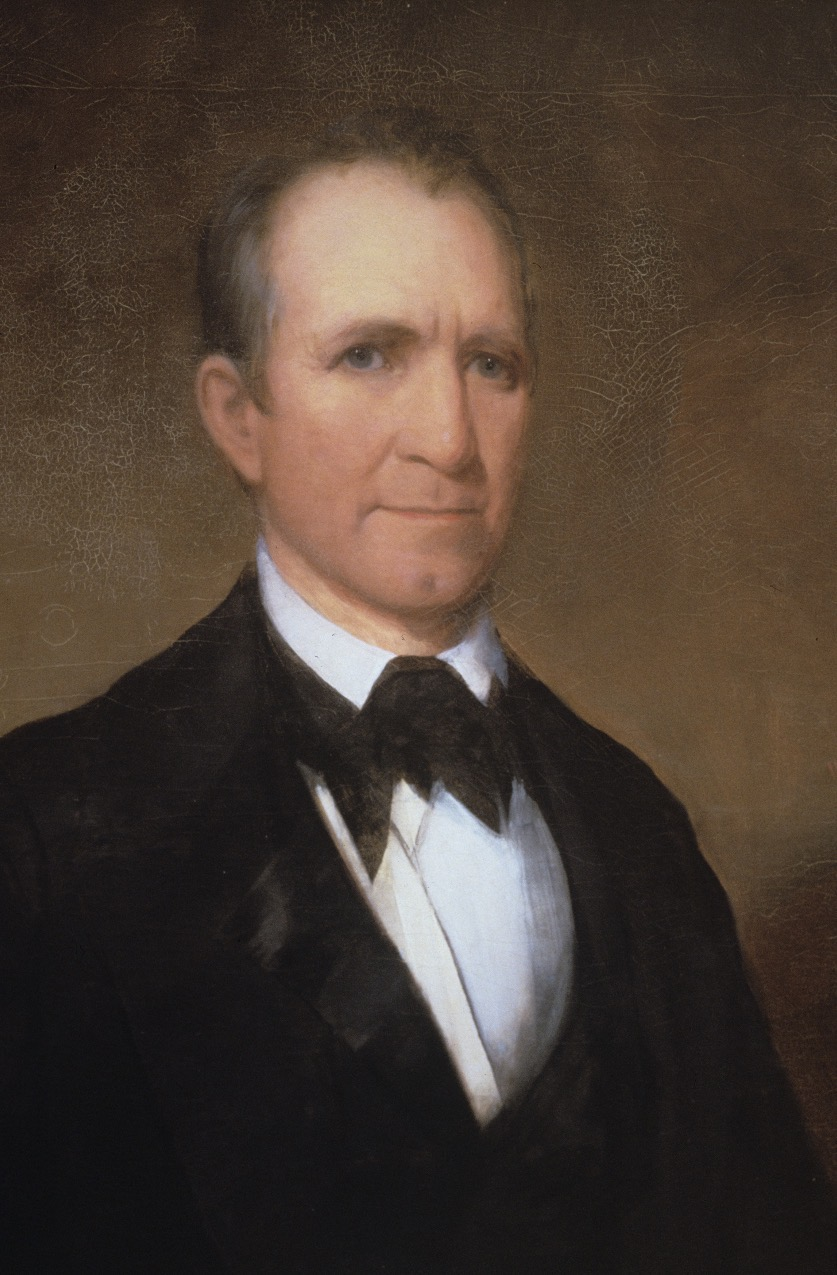
Washington Bogart Cooper, American frontiersman and statesman Sam Houston (1793–1863), 1845, Tennessee Portrait Project

=== Enslaved during Houston's military career ===
In the meantime, Sam Houston resigned his post as Governor of Tennessee (1829) and he settled in Indian Territory. In late 1832, Houston moved to Mexican Texas and established a law practice in Nacogdoches. Mexican law prohibited any religion other than Catholicism, and Houston converted to the faith at the Nacogdoches home of Adolphus Sterne.

In 1834, Blue was purchased in Tennessee by Houston. The Consultation of October 1835 to March 1836 convened in San Felipe de Austin on November 3, and created of a constitutional provisional government and the Provisional Army of Texas, a paid force of 2,500 troops. Houston was named commander-in-chief of the new army and in charge of training those who enlisted. On April 21, 1836, Houston's troops attacked the Mexican army during the 18-minute Battle of San Jacinto. Although outnumbered, and with Houston wounded, the Texans were victorious against General Antonio López de Santa Anna of Mexico.

On May 7, the Yellowstone steamboat transported Houston and his prisoner Santa Anna, along with the government Santa Anna tried to extinguish, to Galveston Island. Blue said he served with Houston at the battle, (Note: When Blue lived in Harrisburg, he signed an affidavit that he had been at the battle with Houston.) and was detailed by Houston to serve the captured Mexican general. From there, the government and Santa Anna traveled to Velasco for the signing of treaties. Houston had suffered a serious wound to his foot during the battle and on May 28 boarded the schooner Flora for medical treatment in New Orleans. Houston won the 1836 presidential election for the Republic of Texas.

=== Role in the Houston household ===
Blue was Houston's body guard and coachman. He was also described as a "negro retainer" along with a man named Esau (also Esaw), both of whom were acquired before Houston's marriage to Margaret Lea. Blue was described as "a fine-looking mulatto with the manners and speech of a high-class gentleman."

Houston had twelve enslaved people when he became the governor of Texas. Blue, Joshua Houston and Jeff transported Houston, his family, and their belongings to the Governor's Mansion in Austin. One of the maids was named Eliza. Aunt Mary and her daughters Creasy and Mary were also enslaved by Houston. The male servants of the Houston family had quarters in the stable.

Throughout his life, Houston had a penchant for travel and his family and their servants learned to become "as mobile as the cavalry".

The march of years had not diminished his passion for motion, and the Houston family, with its cluster of little ones, whose number methodically increased to seven, became as mobile as calvary. A notion to trek would strike the General. In an hour the children would be rounded up by Margaret and the maids. With trunks lashed to the boot, a surplus negro or two perched on the top and a flourish of Tom Blue’s long whip, the great yellow carry-all and four horses would be off in a cloud of rolling dust, General Houston leading the way in a single-seated top buggy beside the gigantic Joshua, his driver… On, on—always in flight.

— Marquis James, The Raven: A Biography of Sam Houston

=== Flight ===
Blue left Huntsville, Texas, for Mexico in the fall of 1862. (Note: There is an erroneous claim in a magazine article and in his obituary that Blue was with Houston until his death (1863).) He traveled with a boy named Walter Hume who was also held by Houston. Since Blue was able to pass as white with his light complexion, he convinced Walter, the son of a slave owned by a Huntsville blacksmith, that the best way to get to Mexico would be to present themselves as slave and master. Blue was able to pass for white at the immigration office in Eagle Pass. After they crossed the border to Mexico, Blue sold Walter for $800. (Note: James L. Haley recorded that they traveled together to Laredo where Blue sold Walter for $800. Blue then crossed the border into Mexico.)

=== Houston's slaves ===
Blue has been said to have runaway just before Houston freed his slaves. Houston was said to have conveyed to them Abraham Lincoln's September 1862 Emancipation Proclamation, which would free all enslaved people on January 1, 1863. According to the story published in James Haley's Sam Houston, Houston decided to free them immediately. However, the Emancipation Proclamation was not announced in Texas until June 1865, Juneteenth. (Note: When Houston died in 1863, his slaves were part of the inventory of his estate and valued at $10,530 (~$210,064 in 2024). Joshua Houston's son Samuel Walker Houston was born in February 1864, seven months after Sam Houston's death, and is always referred to as having been born into slavery.)

== Later life ==
Blue worked at the Harris County Courthouse, where he met Judge Vasmer. He later received a pension from the county. He was married on September 2, 1909, to 30-year-old Camille Milton by Judge Vasmer. Blue said that he was 119 years old at the time.

He lived in Harris County, Texas most of his life. He was a religious man who quoted Biblical scripture and attended church in Harrisburg. Blue never learned to read or write.

Blue died in Harrisburg of old age in July 1910 and was interred at the Harrisburg-Jackson Cemetery. He is mentioned on a Texas historical marker as one of the interred African American citizens of Harrisburg.

== Sources ==
- Haley, James L. (2015). Sam Houston. University of Oklahoma Press. ISBN 978-0-8061-5215-8.
- James, Marquis (1929). The Raven: A Biography of Sam Houston. The Bobbs-Merrill Company. OCLC 1320838620.
- Moore, Stephen L. (2004). Eighteen Minutes: The Battle of San Jacinto and the Texas Independence Campaign. Plano, Texas: Republic of Texas Press. ISBN 978-1-58907-009-7.
- Prather, Patricia Smith; Monday, Jane Clements (1993). From Slave to Statesman: The Legacy of Joshua Houston, Servant to Sam Houston. Denton, Texas: University of North Texas Press. ISBN 978-0-929398-47-1.
- Roberts, Madge Thornall (1993). Star of Destiny: The Private Life of Sam and Margaret Houston. University of North Texas Press. ISBN 0-929398-51-3. LCCN 92031587 – via the University of North Texas Digital Library.
- Roberts, Madge Thornall (2001). The Personal Correspondence of Sam Houston, Volume IV, 1852–1863. University of North Texas Press. ISBN 978-1-57441-084-6.
- Williams, John Hoyt (1984). Sam Houston: The Life and Times of the Liberator of Texas, an Authentic American Hero. Touchstone. ISBN 978-0-671-88071-2.
