= Kittrell, Texas =

- Ghost town
- Location in Texas Location in the United States
- Country: United States
- State: Texas
- County: Walker
- Founded by: Pleasant Williams Kittrell
- Elevation: 161 ft (49 m)
- ZIP code: 75862
- Area code: 936
- FIPS code: 48-62408
- GNIS feature ID: 1383164

Kittrell is a ghost town approximately 20 miles north of Huntsville and 10 miles west of Trinity in Walker County, Texas, United States. It was named after and founded by Pleasant Williams Kittrell, a physician who helped found the University of Texas and was a member of Sam Houston's presidential cabinet.

== History ==
Founded in the late 1850s, Kittrell's max population reached 104 people in 1889 but has since dwindled. Pleasant Williams Kittrell settled in the region designated Kittrell's Cut-Off because it was separated from the remainder of the county by the Trinity River; for many years, the town was only accessible by boat. The community that bore his name had a post office from 1878 to 1920. In 1911, a six-grade school operated at Kittrell, but the school closed and merged with the Trinity Independent School District in 1933. In 1914, the Texas Gazetteer reported a general store, a cotton gin, and a seed mill in town operation. In 1945, the community had 25 residents and one business.

The town was not accessible by car until the 1950s. Before then, the town had been mostly abandoned due to boating being the only method of travel into the town. 1991 county highway maps listed a general region designated as Kittrell (Trinity) oilfield. In 2010, the town had 39 people, one business, and two churches.

Nearby is the Chalk Creek cemetery, which has served the community since 1865 and has several Civil War gravestones. The gravesite was officially listed as a Texas historical site in 1988.

== Notable people ==
- Pleasant Williams Kittrell - Texas historian, co-founder of the University Of Texas, and member of Sam Houston's political campaign.
- Sam Houston - president of Texas, believed to have lived on land that is now Kittrell.
