= Pleasant Williams Kittrell =

American physician, politician (1805–1867)

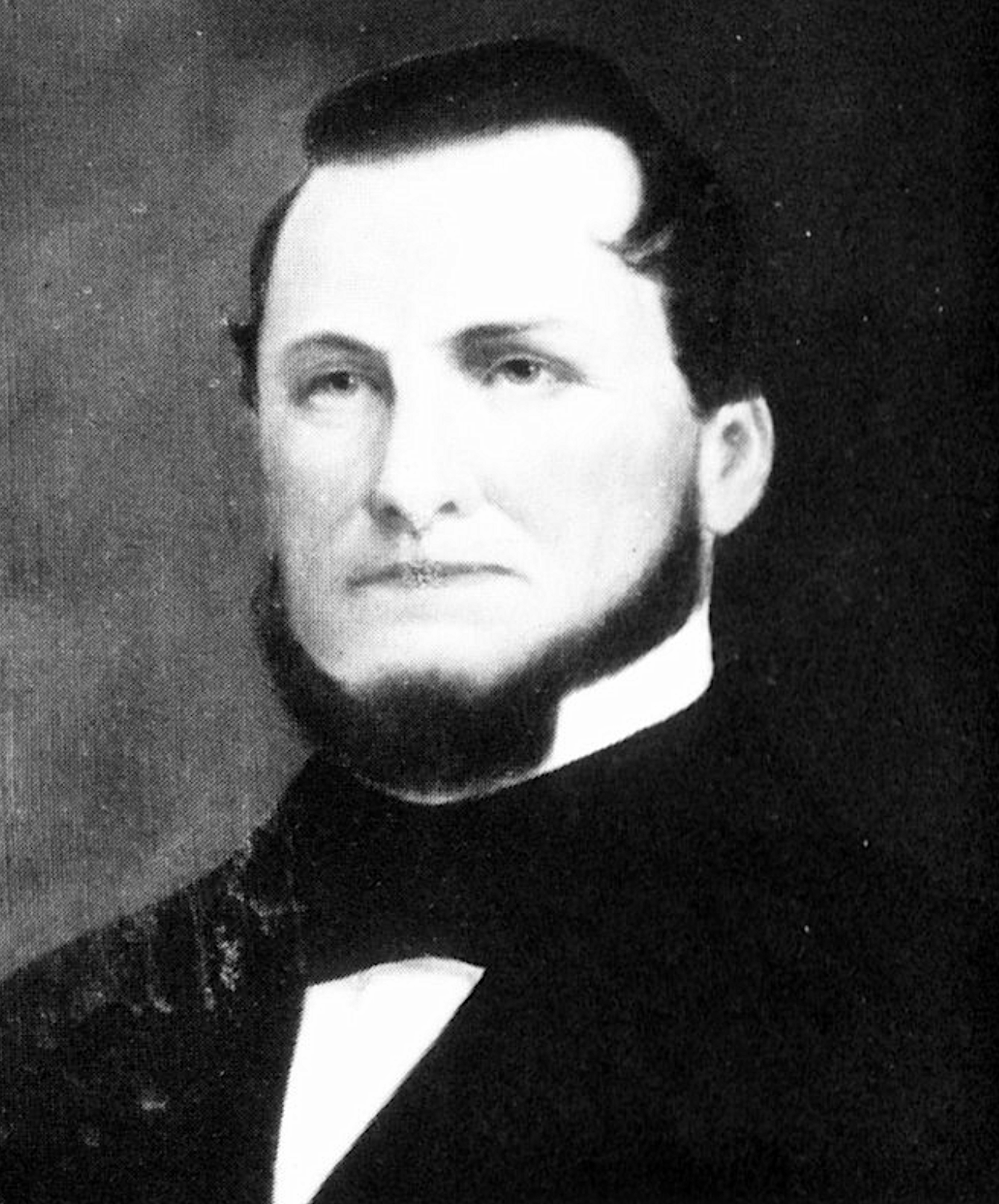

Member of the House of Representatives for the 6th Texas Legislature
- In office November 5, 1855 – September 1, 1856

Member of the House of Representatives for the 7th Texas Legislature
- In office November 7, 1859 – November 2, 1857

Personal details
- Born: April 13, 1805 Chapel Hill, North Carolina, U.S.
- Died: circa September 29, 1867 (aged 62) Huntsville, Texas, U.S.
- Resting place: Oakwood Cemetery, Huntsville, Texas, U.S.
- Party: Democratic
- Spouse(s): Ann Hicks Pegues (m. 1826–1846; her death); Mary Frances Goree (m. 1847–1867; his death)
- Children: 8
- Education: University of North Carolina at Chapel Hill (BA), University of Pennsylvania
- Occupation: Physician, politician, planter

Pleasant Williams Kittrell (April 13, 1805 – c. September 29, 1867), commonly known as P. W. Kittrell, was an American medical doctor, politician, and planter. He was Sam Houston's personal physician, a member of the Texas House of Representatives for two terms, and a pioneer of the University of Texas System. He also served three terms in the Alabama state legislature, and two terms in the North Carolina state legislature.

== Early life and education ==
Pleasant Williams Kittrell was born on April 13, 1805, at Chapel Hill, North Carolina, to parents Mary (née Norman) and Bryant Kittrell.

He graduated in 1822 at the age of 17, from the University of North Carolina at Chapel Hill. He continued his medical studies at the University of Pennsylvania (now known as the Perelman School of Medicine), however he did not complete his degree and left in 1824.

== Family ==
In 1826, he married Ann Hicks Pegues, and together they had two children. His first wife died in 1846. By 1847, he remarried Mary Frances Goree, and they had six children.

== Career and late life ==
After leaving the medical school at the University of Pennsylvania early, Kittrell returned to North Carolina to practice medicine. Kitrell was twice elected to the North Carolina legislature, serving in the North Carolina House of Commons in 1832 and 1833. He also served as a trustee of the University of North Carolina at Chapel Hill.

In 1837, Kittrell moved to Alabama, and continued to practice medicine. He was elected to the Alabama state legislature three times. The University of Alabama conferred on him an honorary master of arts degree while he was serving in the Alabama legislature. He served as a trustee for Judson College, a private women's college in Marion, Alabama.

In 1850, the Kittrell family, the Goree family, and the people they enslaved, moved together to Madison County, Texas and lived at Prairie View Plantation. Prairie View Plantation (was later known as the Alta Vista Plantation) is now occupied by Prairie View A&M University in Prairie View, Texas. The Kittrell family later settled in Huntsville, Texas, where Kittrell continued his medical practice and befriended statesman Sam Houston (1793–1863). He worked as Sam Houston's personal physician.

Kittrell served two terms in as a member of the House of Representatives for the Texas state legislature in the 6th and 7th legislatures representing Grimes, Madison, Walker Counties. In the Sixth Legislature, Kittrell ran for Speaker of the House but lost to Hamilton P. Bee. Kittrell authored the bill to establish the University of Texas System while serving in the legislature. The bill was signed by Governor Elisha M. Pease on February 11, 1858, but it was delayed and the university opened in 1883.

After Sam Houston's died in July 1863, Kittrell bought Houston's home, the Steamboat House in Huntsville, and moved there.

== Death and legacy ==
In 1867, the yellow fever epidemic struck Walker County, Texas and Kittrell cared for patients until he succumbed to yellow fever himself. Kittrell died c. September 29, 1867, in his home at Steamboat House in Huntsville.

He is interred at Oakwood Cemetery and his grave has a historical marker erected 1998 by Texas Historical Commission. He was the namesake of the town of Kittrell, Texas, which is now a ghost town.
