= Kittrell-Dail House =

Historic house in North Carolina, United States

- U.S. National Register of Historic Places
- Location within North Carolina Location within the United States
- Nearest city: Renston, North Carolina
- Coordinates: 35°30′44″N 77°29′14″W
- Area: 4.6 acres (1.9 ha)
- Built: 1855
- Architectural style: Greek Revival
- NRHP reference No.: 00000287
- Added to NRHP: March 24, 2000

Kittrell-Dail House is a historic home located near Renston, Pitt County, North Carolina. It was built about 1855, and is a two-story, three-bay, side-gable, single pile frame dwelling with Greek Revival style design elements. It has two contemporary shed roofed wings and a 20th-century rear ell. A one-story, hip roof porch, almost the length of the house, was added about 1920–1930. Also on the property is the contributing kitchen building (c. 1855).

It was listed on the National Register of Historic Places in 2000.
