= Cedar Point, Texas =

- CDP
- Interactive map of Cedar Point, Texas
- Coordinates: 30°47′51″N 95°04′30″W
- Country: United States
- State: Texas
- County: Polk

Area
  - Total: 1.9 sq mi (4.9 km^{2})
  - Land: 0.89 sq mi (2.3 km^{2})
  - Water: 1.0 sq mi (2.6 km^{2})
- Elevation: 128 ft (39 m)

Population (2010)
  - Total: 630
  - Density: 710/sq mi (270/km^{2})
- Time zone: UTC-6 (Central (CST))
  - Summer (DST): UTC-5 (CDT)
- Zip Code: 77351
- GNIS feature ID: 2586918

Cedar Point is a census-designated place (CDP) in Polk County, Texas, United States. This was a new CDP for the 2010 census. As of the 2020 census, Cedar Point had a population of 851.

== Geography ==
Cedar Point has a total area of 1.9 square miles (4.9 km^{2}), of which 0.9 square miles (2.3 km^{2}) is land and 1.0 square mile (2.6 km^{2}) is water.

== Demographics ==
Historical population
Census	Pop.	Note	%±
2010	630		—
2020	851		35.1%
U.S. Decennial Census; 1850–1900 1910; 1920 1930 1940; 1950 1960 1970; 1980 1990 2000; 2010 2020

Cedar Point first appeared as a census designated place in the 2010 U.S. census.

=== 2020 census ===
Cedar Point CDP, Texas – Racial and ethnic composition Note: the US Census treats Hispanic/Latino as an ethnic category. This table excludes Latinos from the racial categories and assigns them to a separate category. Hispanics/Latinos may be of any race.
Race / Ethnicity (NH = Non-Hispanic)	Pop 2010	Pop 2020	% 2010	% 2020
White alone (NH)	571	724	90.63%	85.08%
Black or African American alone (NH)	16	13	2.54%	1.53%
Native American or Alaska Native alone (NH)	2	7	0.32%	0.82%
Asian alone (NH)	3	6	0.48%	0.71%
Native Hawaiian or Pacific Islander alone (NH)	0	0	0.00%	0.00%
Other race alone (NH)	0	6	0.00%	0.71%
Mixed race or Multiracial (NH)	2	28	0.32%	3.29%
Hispanic or Latino (any race)	36	67	5.71%	7.87%
Total	630	851	100.00%	100.00%
