= Sam Houston Jr. =

American soldier, physician, and author; eldest child of Sam Houston

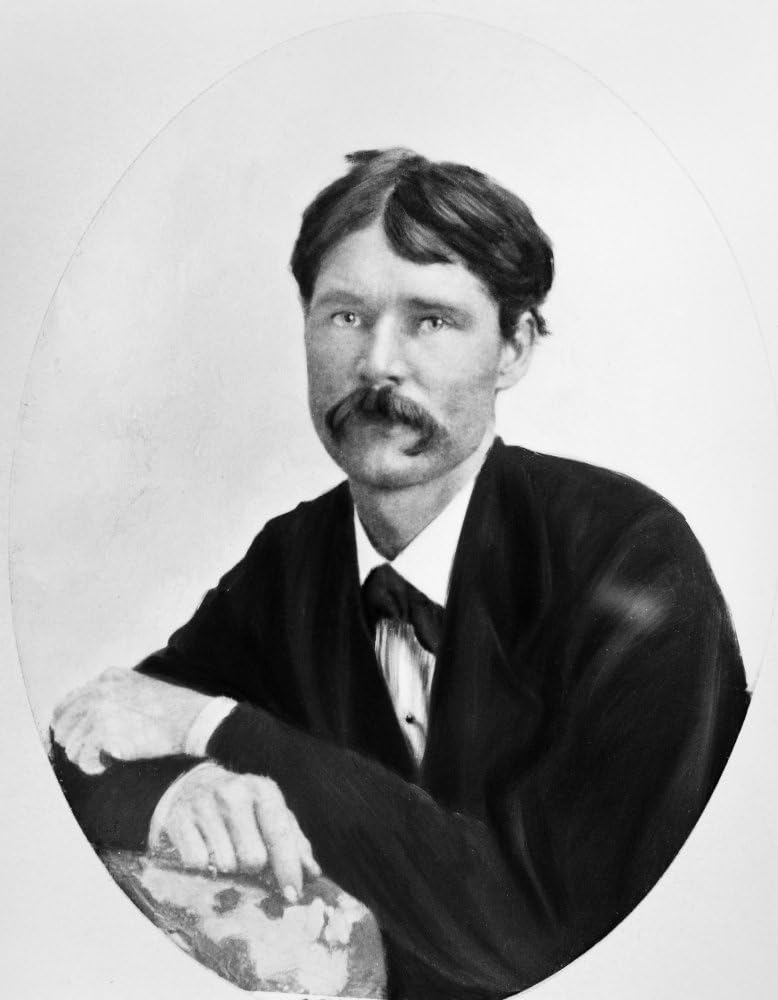
Sam Houston Jr.

Samuel Houston Jr. (May 25, 1843–1894) was the oldest of eight children born to President of the Republic of Texas, Sam Houston, and First Lady Margaret Lea Houston, and was the only of the children born in the Republic of Texas, before its December 29, 1845 annexation to the United States.

He was home-schooled by his mother, and later attended both Bastrop Military Institute and Baylor University. After Texas seceded from the Union in 1861, he enlisted in the Confederate States Army 2nd Texas Infantry Regiment, Company C Bayland Guards. Wounded at the April 1862 Battle of Shiloh, he served time as a prisoner of war at Camp Douglas in Illinois. Following his release, he received a medical discharge from the Confederate States Army. He attended the Philadelphia University of Medicine and Surgery. Upon graduation, he returned to a private life, and it is unknown if he ever practiced medicine. At some point, he became a writer. Houston married Lucy Anderson in 1875. Their daughter Margaret Bell Houston (1877–1966) was also a writer, as well as a suffragist who became the first president of the Dallas Equal Suffrage Association. Upon his death, Sam Jr. was buried on private property near his mother.

== Family and historical background ==
Sam Houston, Jr. was born at home on May 25, 1843, at Washington-on-the-Brazos, Texas. He was the oldest child of Sam Houston and his third wife Margaret Lea Houston. The elder Houston had no children with his two previous wives. At the time of his son's birth, Sam Sr. was serving as 3rd President of the Republic of Texas. The Republic was annexed to the United States as the 28th state on December 29, 1845, and the seven other Houston children were born in the US state of Texas: Nancy "Nannie" Elizabeth (1846) was born at their Raven Hill plantation home. Five of the children were born at the family's Woodland home: Margaret "Maggie" Lea (1848); Mary William "Mary Willie" (1850); Antoinette "Nettie" Power (1852); Andrew Jackson (1854); and William "Willie" Rogers Houston (1858). Temple Lea (1860), was the only Houston child born in the Texas Governor's Mansion.

He received his basic education through home schooling from his mother. While Sam Jr. was enrolled at Bastrop Military Institute, the Texas Secession Convention passed the Texas Ordinance of Secession on February 1, 1861, effectively becoming part of the Confederate States of America on March 1. His father was Governor of Texas at the time, and was removed from office for refusing to take an oath of loyalty to the Confederacy. The elder Houston did not believe it was in the best interests of Texas to break away from the union.

== Civil War ==
Sometime during August 1861, Sam Houston, Jr., enlisted in the Confederate States Army 2nd Texas Infantry Regiment, Company C Bayland Guards, sending his mother Margaret into melancholia. She dreaded that her first-born child would never be home again. "My heart seems almost broken ... what shall I do? How shall I bear it? When I first heard the news, I thought I would lie down and die", she wrote to her mother Nancy Moffette Lea. Houston Sr. tried to help out by assuming care of their other children in between his extended visits to Galveston. Her fears seemed well-founded when her son was critically wounded and left for dead at the April 1862 Battle of Shiloh. A second bullet was stopped by his Bible, bearing an inside inscription from Margaret. He was found languishing in a field by a Union Army clergyman who picked up the Bible and also found a letter from Margaret in his pocket. Taken prisoner and sent to Camp Douglas in Illinois, he was later released in a prisoner exchange and received a medical discharge in October.

== Medical school ==
Sam Jr. received his basic education at Baylor University and Bastrop Academy. His father Sam Sr. had died in 1863, two years before the April 9, 1865 Battle of Appomattox Court House that ended the war. Following the end of the war, Houston enrolled at the Philadelphia University of Medicine and Surgery (most likely Perelman School of Medicine at the University of Pennsylvania), graduating in 1869. Margaret Lea Houston pooled her real estate resources through rentals or taking out mortgages, to help finance Sam Jr.'s medical education. Little is known about him after his graduation from medical school. Some sources say he briefly practiced medicine, while other sources say he never practiced medicine.

== Personal life ==
Houston published a collection of articles and short stories, entitled Sam Houston’s Rambling Rustlings.

In 1875, he married Lucy Anderson. Upon his wife's death in 1886, Houston moved in with his sister Margaret Lea Houston Williams at Independence, Texas, where he died in 1894. He was buried on private property near his mother there.

Lucy's and Sam Jr.'s daughter Margaret Bell Houston (1877–1966) was a writer and suffragist who became the first president of the Dallas Equal Suffrage Association. A second daughter Nellie (1879–1882) did not live long. Sam Jr.'s son Harry Howard Houston (1880–1935) worked in the medical field in Fort Worth, Texas.

== Footnotes ==
=== References ===
- Roberts, Madge Thornall (1993). Star of Destiny: The Private Life of Sam and Margaret Houston. Denton, TX: University of North Texas Press. ISBN 0-929398-51-3.
- Seale, William (1992) [1970]. Sam Houston's Wife: A Biography of Margaret Lea Houston. University of Oklahoma Press. ISBN 978-0-8061-2436-0.
- Haley, James L. (2004). Sam Houston. Norman, OK: University of Oklahoma Press. ISBN 978-0-8061-3644-8.
- Houston, Sam; Roberts, Madge Thornall (1996a). The Personal Correspondence of Sam Houston – Vol. 1: 1839–1845. Denton, TX: University of North Texas Press. ISBN 1-57441-000-8.
- Houston, Sam; Roberts, Madge Thornall (1996b). The Personal Correspondence of Sam Houston – Vol. 2: 1846–1848. Denton, TX: University of North Texas Press. ISBN 1-57441-063-6.
- Houston, Sam; Roberts, Madge Thornall (1996c). The Personal Correspondence of Sam Houston – Vol. 3: 1848–1852. Denton, TX: University of North Texas Press. ISBN 1-57441-031-8.
- Houston, Sam; Roberts, Madge Thornall (1996d). The Personal Correspondence of Sam Houston – Vol. 4: 1852–1863. Denton, TX: University of North Texas Press. ISBN 1-57441-084-9.
