= Margaret Bell Houston =

American writer and suffragist

- Born: 1877; Cedar Bayou, Texas
- Died: June 22, 1966 (aged 88–89); St. Petersburg, Florida
- Education: St. Mary's College; American Academy of Dramatic Arts; Columbia University
- Occupations: Writer and suffragist

Margaret Bell Houston (also Margaret Bell Houston Kauffman, 1877 – June 22, 1966) was an American writer and suffragist who lived in Texas and New York. Houston published over 20 novels, most of them set in Texas. Her work was also published in Good Housekeeping and McCalls in serial format.

== Early life ==
Houston was born in Cedar Bayou, Texas, in 1877, to Sam Houston Jr. and his wife Lucy Anderson. Her paternal grandparents were Sam Houston and Margaret Lea Houston. She began writing at age eight. She was the sister of Dallas resident Harry Howard Houston (1883–1935).

== Education ==
Houston attended St. Mary's College, the American Academy of Dramatic Arts and Columbia University. She was first published in the newspapers, the Brenham Banner and the Dallas News.

== Personal life ==
Houston moved to Dallas and married a businessman named Kauffman. In 1913, she was the first president of the Dallas Equal Suffrage Association (DESA). Under her tenure as president of DESA, the group grew to around 200 members. She also started writing her first novel, Little Straw Wife (1914), during that time.

Houston moved to St. Petersburg, Florida, in 1953. Cottonwoods Grow Tall (1958), written after her move to Florida received "critical praise as a work of literary merit". Kirkus Reviews called it a "femininely accented story".

Houston died in St. Petersburg on June 22, 1966. Her body was transported back to Dallas to be buried at Restland Cemetery.

== Selected publications ==
- Cottonwoods Grow Tall. New York: Crown Publishers. 1958. OCLC 1445014.
- Yonder. New York: Crown Publishers. 1955. OCLC 6227307.
- Bride's Island. New York: Crown Publishers. 1951. OCLC 285589.
- Pilgrim in Manhattan. New York: D. Appleton-Century Co. 1940. OCLC 6629304.
- Window in Heaven. New York: D. Appleton-Century Co. 1937. OCLC 7602976.
- Hurdy-gurdy, a Novel. New York: D. Appleton. 1932. OCLC 2416057.
- Moon of Delight. New York: Dodd, Mead & Company. 1931. OCLC 3467236.
- Lanterns in the Dusk. New York: Dodd, Mead & Company. 1930. OCLC 2051973.
- The Singing Heart, and Other Poems. Dallas: Cokesbury Press. 1926. OCLC 1617077.
- The Witch Man. Boston: Small, Maynard & Company. 1922. OCLC 1817150.
- Little Straw Wife. New York: H.K. Fly Company. 1914. OCLC 2416054.
- Prairie Flowers. Boston: R.G. Badger. 1907. OCLC 18373036.

== Bibliography ==
- Enstam, Elizabeth York (2001). "A Question to Be 'Settled Right': The Dallas Campaign for Woman Suffrage, 1913–1919". Legacies: A History Journal for Dallas and North Central Texas. 13 (2): 30–38. Archived from the original on 5 May 2016.
- Enstam, Elizabeth York (1998). Women and the Creation of Urban Life: Dallas, Texas, 1843–1920. Texas A&M University Press. p. 158. ISBN 9780890967997. "margaret bell houston."
