= 2nd Texas Infantry Regiment =

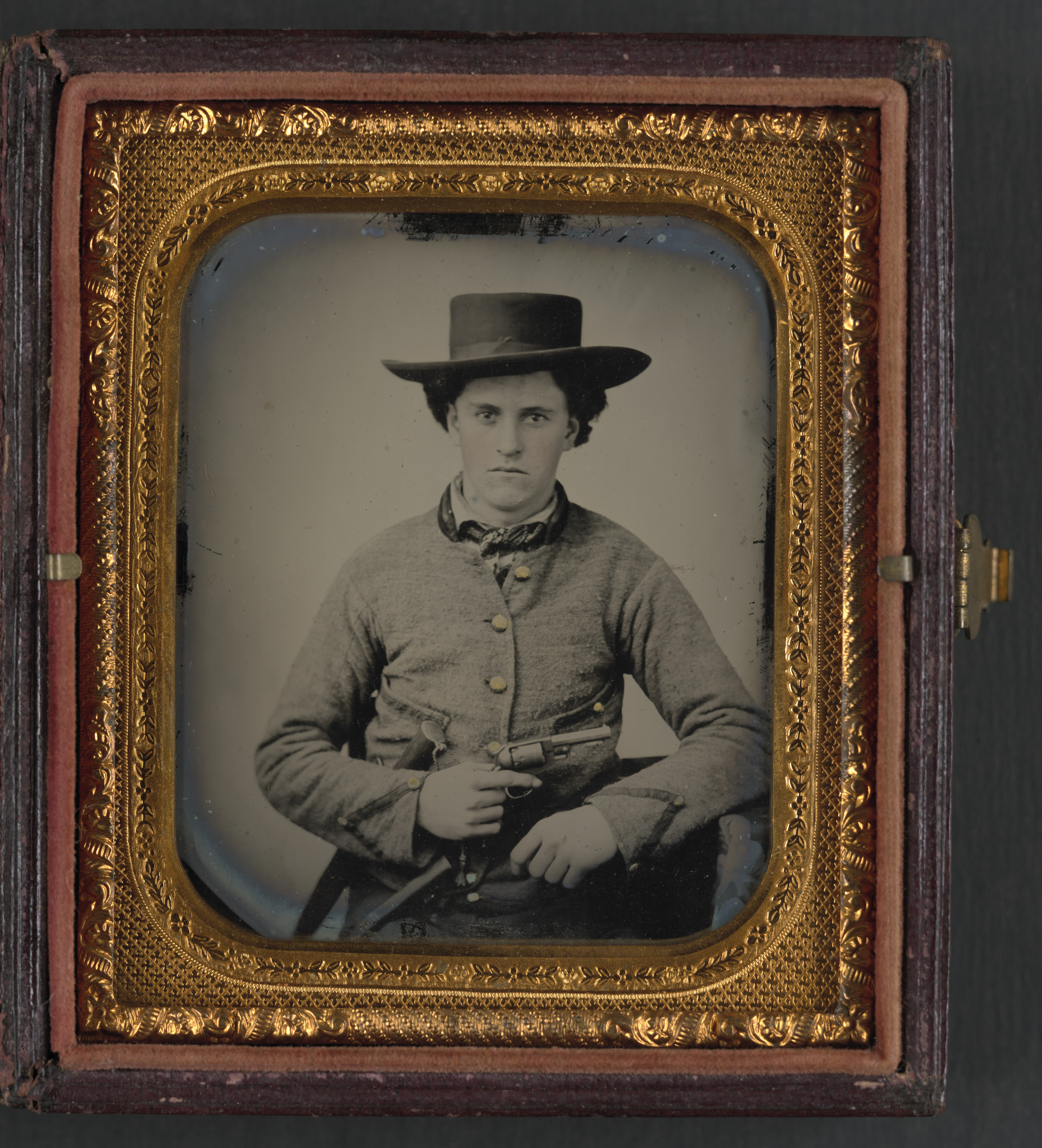
- Private Charles H. Ruff, 2nd Texas Infantry Regiment
- Active: 1861 – 1865
- Country: Confederate States of America
- Allegiance: Confederate States of America, Texas
- Branch: Confederate States Army
- Type: Infantry
- Size: Regiment
- Nickname: 2nd Texas Sharpshooters
- Engagements: American Civil War: Battle of Shiloh; Siege of Corinth; Second Battle of Corinth; Battle of Hatchie's Bridge; Battle of Snyder's Bluff; Siege of Vicksburg

Commanders
- Notable commanders: John Creed Moore; Noble L. McGinnis; William P. Rogers; Ashbel Smith

The 2nd Regiment, Texas Infantry was an infantry regiment from Texas that served with Confederate States Army in the American Civil War. The regiment was organized by the then Captain John Creed Moore, who would become the regiment's 1st Colonel. Many of the men were from Houston and Galveston.

== Formation ==
Following the ratification of Texas' Ordinance of Secession on February 20, 1861, militia companies from across the state started forming to protect the new Confederacy. Once these independent companies were formed, they were ordered to Galveston to defend the Texas coast. By September of 1861, the regiment was brought to full strength, and the Confederate government in Richmond was notified. The Confederate War Department accepted Moore's Regiment as the First Texas Infantry Regiment. However, due to the political influence of Texas Senator Louis T. Wigfall, his battalion of Texas companies, which independently moved to Richmond, received the honor of being named First Texas. Thus, Moore's regimental designation was changed to Second Texas.

Once the regiment was formed, Moore started drilling his men on Galveston Island. One of its companies, Captain Ashbel Smith's Bayland Guards, Company C, had Sam Houston Jr. among its ranks. Ever so often, his father, Sam Houston, would come by and watch the drills. Though a fervent unionist, Houston supported the soldiers and raised their morale with his humor.

In December of 1861, the regiment was moved to Camp Bee in Houston. The regiment would continue drilling until Moore received orders in March of 1862 to join Major General Earl Van Dorn in Arkansas. Once in Helena, Moore received new orders to report to General Albert Sidney Johnston in Corinth. After nearly a month of traveling, the regiment joined the Army of Mississippi. Once they arrived, the men also received their uniforms. These were undyed white wool uniforms that Moore ordered while they traveled from Texas.

Recruitment Areas of the 2nd Texas Infantry Regiment
Company	Nickname	Recruitment Area
A	San Jacinto Guards	Harris County
B	Confederate Guards	Harris County
C	Bayland Guards	Chambers County
D	Confederate Greys	Harris County
E	N/A	Robertson County
F	N/A	Galveston County
G	Burleson Guards	Burleson County
H	Lexington Greys	Lee County
I	Wilson Rifles	Gonzales County
K	Texana Guards	Jackson County

Notable battles that the regiment has been involved in include the Battle of Shiloh, the Second Battle of Corinth, and the Siege of Vicksburg.

== Battle of Shiloh ==
Before Johnston launched his army at Pittsburg Landing. The Second Texas was assigned to Brigadier General John K. Jackson's Third Brigade of Brigadier General Jones M. Withers' Second Division in Major General Braxton Bragg's Third Corps. On April 6, once the Confederates began their attacks, the Second Texas was sent right to fill a gap in the Confederate line. Here, they attacked the camp of Colonel David Stuart's 2nd Brigade and drove the federal defenders off before looting the place. Once the Texans reformed their lines, they helped attack and break the hornet's nest. After taking the hornet's nest, Moore continued his drive north against Pittsburg's Landing but stopped short as the light began to fade. With no more light left, the Texans bivouacked in the abandoned federal camps near Grant's final line. During the night, Buell's arriving forces advanced past the camp where the Texans were sleeping. Unknowingly placing the regiment behind federal lines.

Once light reappeared on April 7, Moore realized his predicament and ordered his men to march along the banks of the Tennessee River to rejoin the Confederate army. When the regiment returned to the army, Moore received a battlefield promotion to Brigadier General and handed command of the regiment to Rogers, who was also promoted. Hardee, who was given command of the army's right, ordered Moore to advance his brigade without any skirmishers. But before advancing, Moore was informed by Hardee that Breckinridge was in front, engaging the Federals. However, as the Texans advanced, they started getting shot at. The Texans wanted to return fire but were ordered not to. Unable to fire, tried to advance but were ambushed, causing a rout in the formation. During the incident, the regiment suffered heavy casualties, with Sam Jr being among the wounded. Hardee, watching the regiment flee the battlefield, ridiculed Moore and his men in his after-action report. When Moore gets word of this, a feud begins between the two generals which would endure long after the war ended.

== Second Battle of Corinth ==
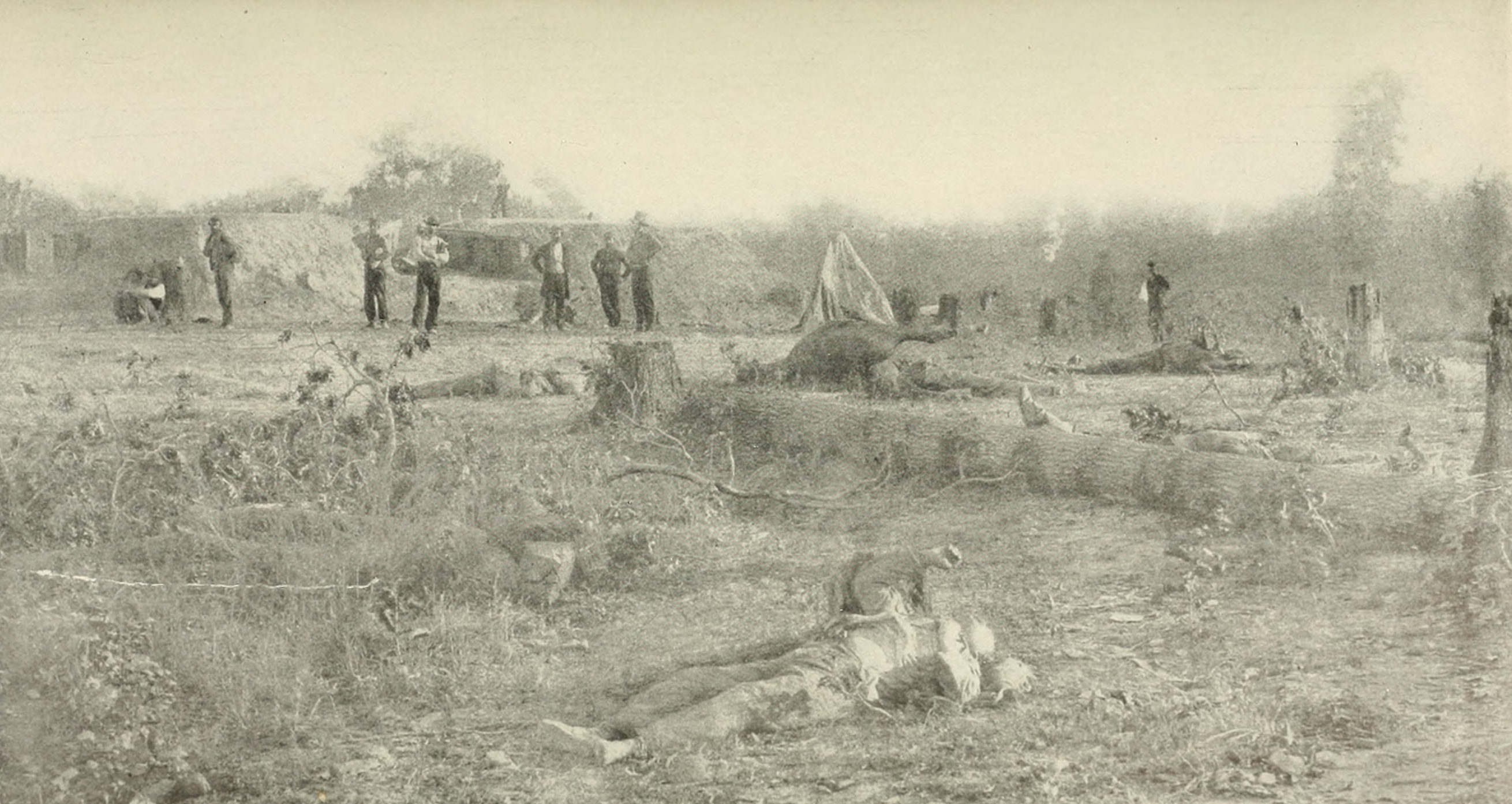
Confederate dead outside the parapet of Battery Robinett on October 5. Col. William P. Rogers of the 2nd Texas lies in the left background-his dead horse is to the right

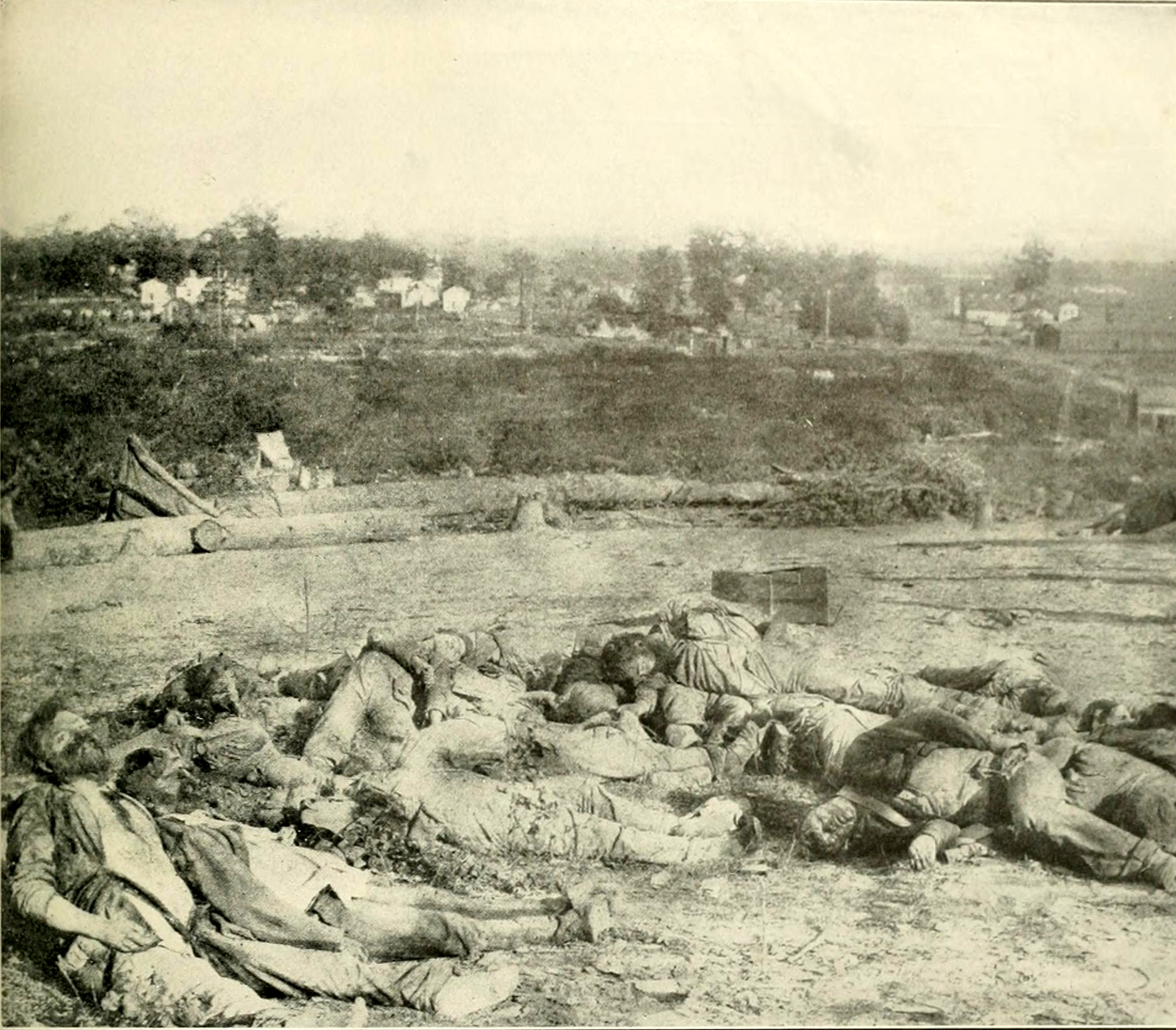
Confederate dead lay gathered at the bottom of the parapet of Battery Robinett on October 5. Col. William P. Rogers of the 2nd Texas lies in the left foreground

The regiment assaulted Battery Robinett, a redan protected by a five-foot ditch, sporting three 20-pounder Parrott rifles commanded by Lt. Henry Robinett. Colonel William P. Rogers, a Mexican–American War comrade of President Jefferson Davis, was among those killed in the charge. Rogers seized his colors to keep them from falling again and jumped a five-foot ditch, leaving his dying horse and assaulted the ramparts of the battery. When the canister shot killed him, he was the fifth bearer of his colors to fall that day. (Note: Eicher states that is one of only a very few Civil War photographs that show an important officer deceased on the field. It is sometimes erroneously reported that Rogers's second-in-command, Colonel Lawrence Sullivan Ross, lies beside him. In fact, Ross went on to become a general and later the governor of Texas. He died in 1898.)

== Siege of Vicksburg ==
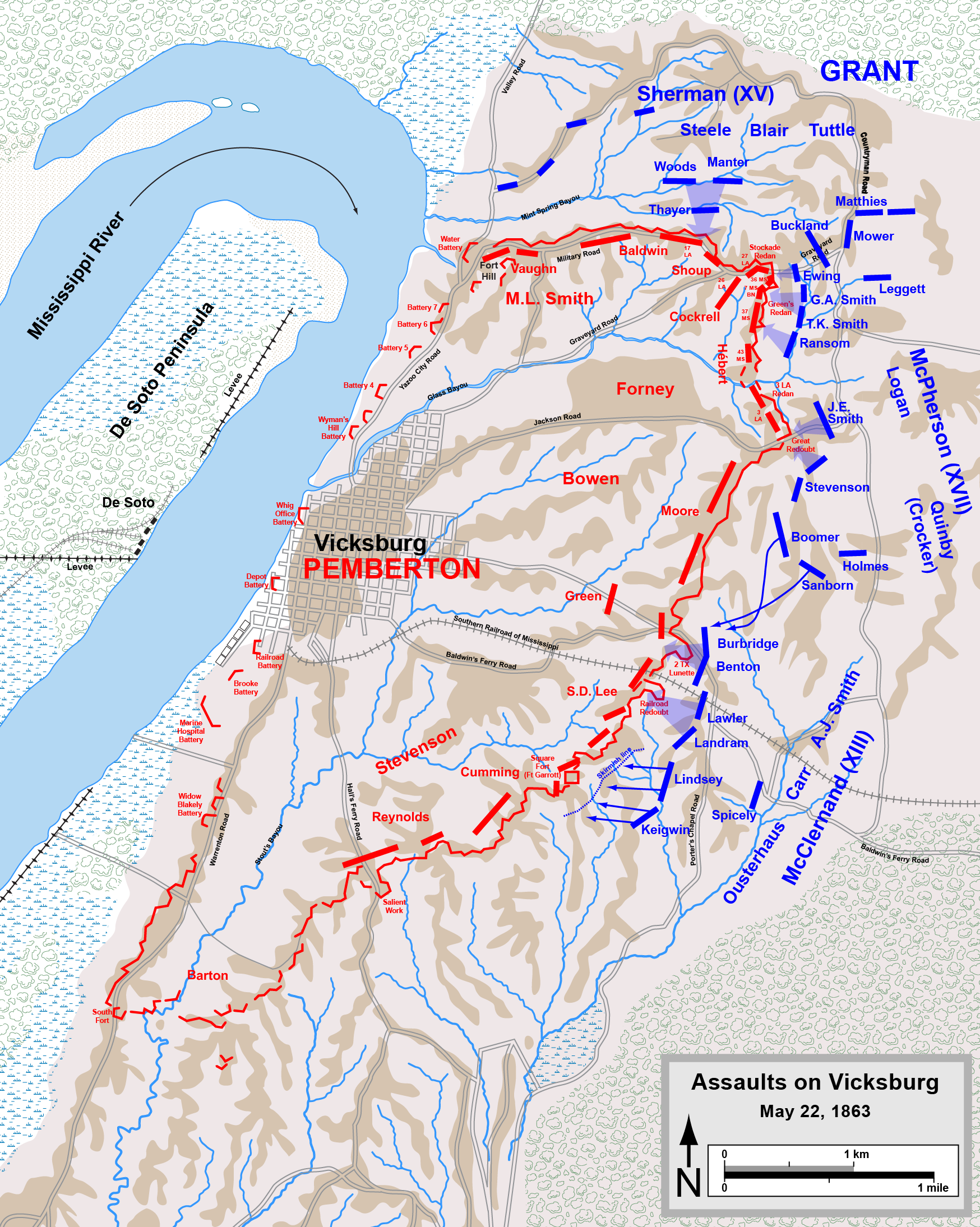
Union assault at Vicksburg on May 22, 1863

The regiment was distinguished for its defense of a crescent-shaped fortification, which came to be known as the Second Texas Lunette. The fortification was located in the center of the Vicksburg line of defense constructed to guard the Baldwin Ferry Road. The lunette was the subject of tremendous artillery bombardment and repeated Union assaults directed against the lunette on May 22, 1863.

== After Vicksburg ==
Following the surrender of the Vicksburg garrison on July 4, 1863, the regiment was furloughed to Texas as paroled prisoners of war. Though they were sent back to Texas, they would not be officially exchanged till November. Once their parole ended, the regiment was reassembled at Camp Bee and placed in Major General John B. Magruder's District of Texas, New Mexico, and Arizona. However, due to the beating the regiment took during its time in Mississippi, it was unable to muster more than a battalion of effective troops. Without the manpower to see frontline combat again, the regiment was sent back to Galveston to guard the port. During their time in Galveston, the regiment would see one more fight during a skirmish at the mouth of Caney Creek in February of 1864. In May of 1865, when they received news of the surrenders of the other Confederate forces east of the Mississippi, the men decided to mutiny rather than surrender. The mutineers ransacked the government warehouses, took what they could get their hands on, and returned to their homes.

== See also ==
- Texas Civil War Confederate Units
- Texas in the American Civil War
