= William Peleg Rogers =

Texan Confederate army officer (1819–1862)

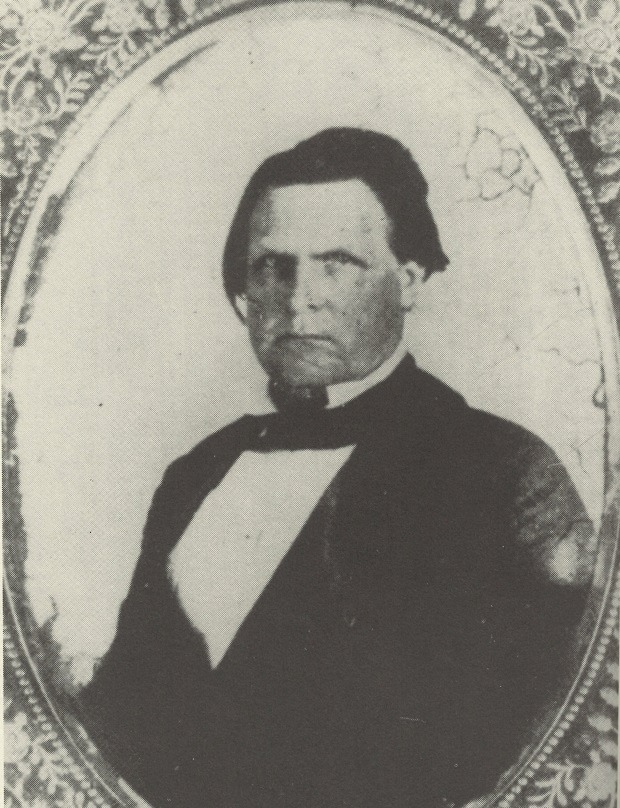
- Born: December 17, 1819; Baldwin County, Georgia, US
- Died: October 4, 1862 (aged 42); Corinth, Mississippi
- Military career
- Allegiance: United States; Confederate States
- Branch: United States Army; Confederate States Army
- Rank: Captain (USA); Colonel (CSA)
- Commands: 2nd Texas Infantry Regiment
- Battles: Mexican–American War; Battle of Monterey; Battle of Buena Vista; American Civil War; Battle of Shiloh; Second Battle of Corinth †

William Peleg Rogers (December 17, 1819 – October 4, 1862) was a Texan lawyer and political activist and a Confederate army officer.

After service in the Mexican War, he strongly supported the cause of secession from the Union, and became colonel of the 2nd Texas Infantry Regiment, Confederate States Army, at the outset of the Civil War.

He was killed in action while leading his regiment in a final charge on the last day of the Second Battle of Corinth, Mississippi. His bravery was noted by the foe.

== Early life ==
William Peleg Rogers, son of Timothy Lincoln and Mary (née Miles) Rogers, was born in Georgia, on December 27, 1819. His parents were then living in Alabama, but in early boyhood his father removed the family to north Mississippi and settled on a plantation near Aberdeen, Monroe county, where William was reared and educated.

Rogers inherited the military inclination from his father, who had served as captain in the Indian wars under General Andrew Jackson. He was prepared for the medical profession, which he abandoned for that of the law.

== Mexican War ==
In the Mexican War Rogers went out from Columbus as first lieutenant of the company of which Colonel A. K. McClung, the noted duellist, was captain. On the organization of the regiment at Vicksburg, before departing for Mexico, Jefferson Davis was elected colonel, McClung lieutenant-colonel and Rogers succeeded McClung as captain, company K, 1st Mississippi Rifles regiment. Rogers was the second man to scale the enemy's walls at Monterey, and at Buena Vista was conspicuous for his courage and reckless daring.

== Law and politics ==
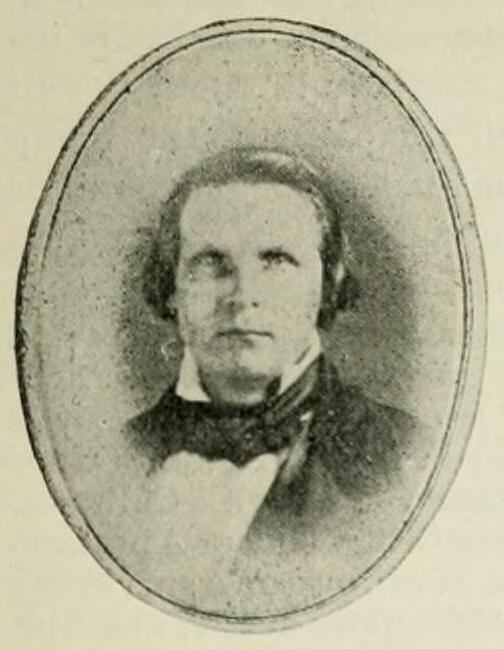
William P. Rogers

During President Taylor's administration Baylor was consul at Vera Cruz, and then removing to Washington, Texas, he soon became a prominent lawyer. His name appears as counsel in many cases in the Supreme Court reports.

Having moved to the city of Houston in 1859, he became a Democrat and strongly supported the presidential hopes of his friend and confidante Sam Houston, but after the election of Lincoln in November 1860, he joined with the radical pro-slavery secessionists, was elected delegate from Harris county to the Texas secession convention in January 1861, and signed the ordinance of secession on February 1, 1861, leading to Texas joining the Confederacy.

== Civil War ==
Rogers was offered the command of a regiment in Virginia, but at the solicitation of his wife, accepted instead the rank of lieutenant-colonel of the 2nd Texas Infantry. In the spring of 1862 this command was sent east of the Mississippi, and Colonel Rogers, detained by illness, joined the regiment on the eve of the battle of Shiloh, in which he participated with distinction and the 2nd Texas lost more than one third of its men in casualties. The retreat to Corinth, the defense of that fortified camp against the Federal army, and the retreat thence to Tupelo, followed.

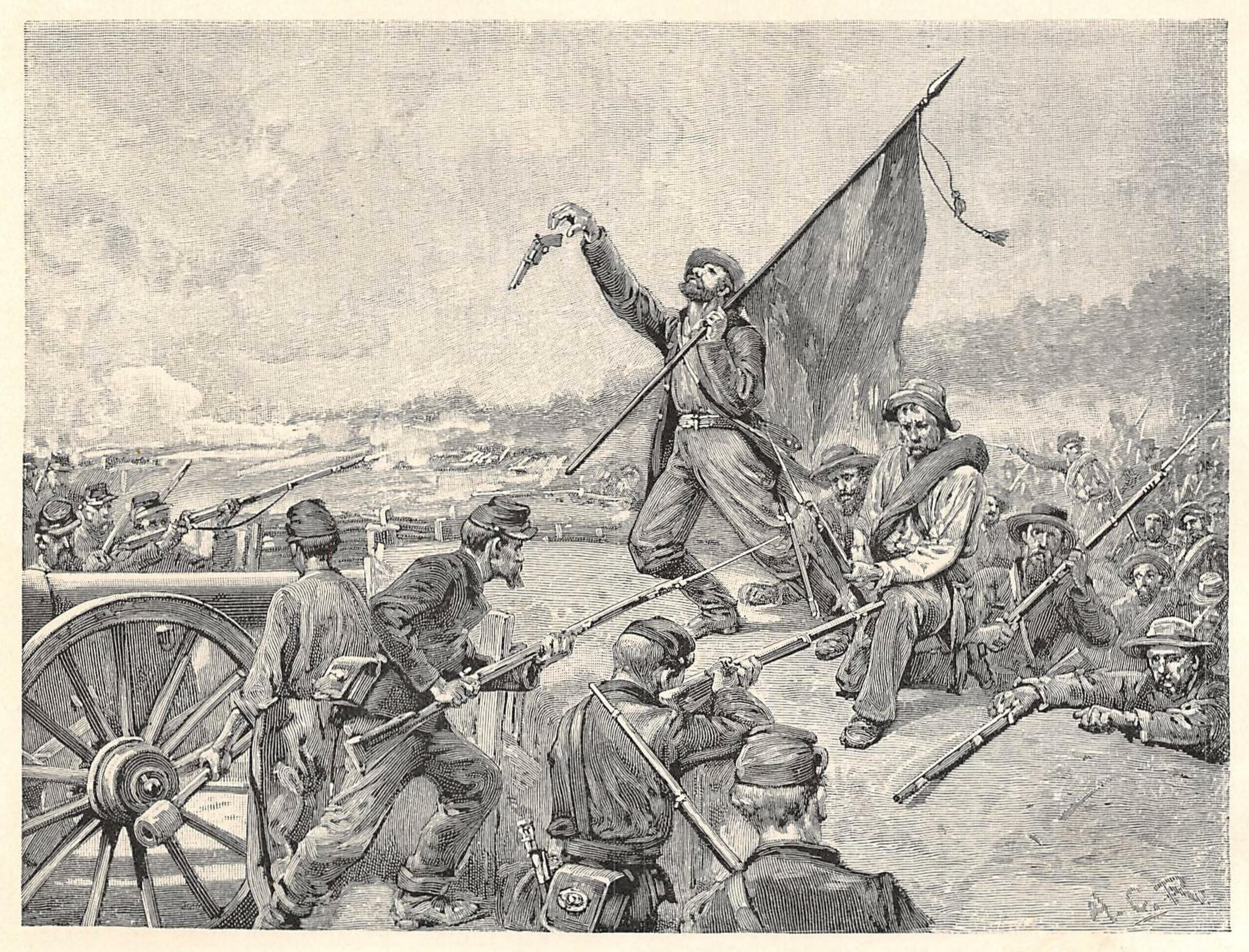
View of the Confederate assault on Battery Robinett (engraving, 1886)

In the fall of 1862, General Bragg having moved into Kentucky with the main Confederate army, Generals Price and Van Dorn attacked Rosecrans in the old fortifications at Corinth. In the charge upon the heavily fortified inner works on the second day of the assault, Rogers's divisional commander, General Dabney H. Maury, ordered Colonel Rogers to lead the vanguard of the assault directly against the front of Fort Robinette, a small fort nestled in the middle of the Union line. After one attempt was bloodily repulsed, Rogers led a second charge, on horseback, in the midst of cannon and musket fire, and, seizing the regimental colors, dismounted, and led several hundred Texans and Alabamians through the defensive trench and embankment and into the fort. He had just climbed to the top of the parapet and planted the colors, when strong Federal forces were seen on the right, and then a volley of fire brought him down and nearly all the men with him. (Note: Accounts differ as to whether Rogers was killed by "a volley of rifle fire", "a charge of grapeshot", "canister shot", or otherwise.) When the battle ended, shortly thereafter, the 2nd Texas had lost more than half its men in casualties.

=== Post-mortem photographs ===
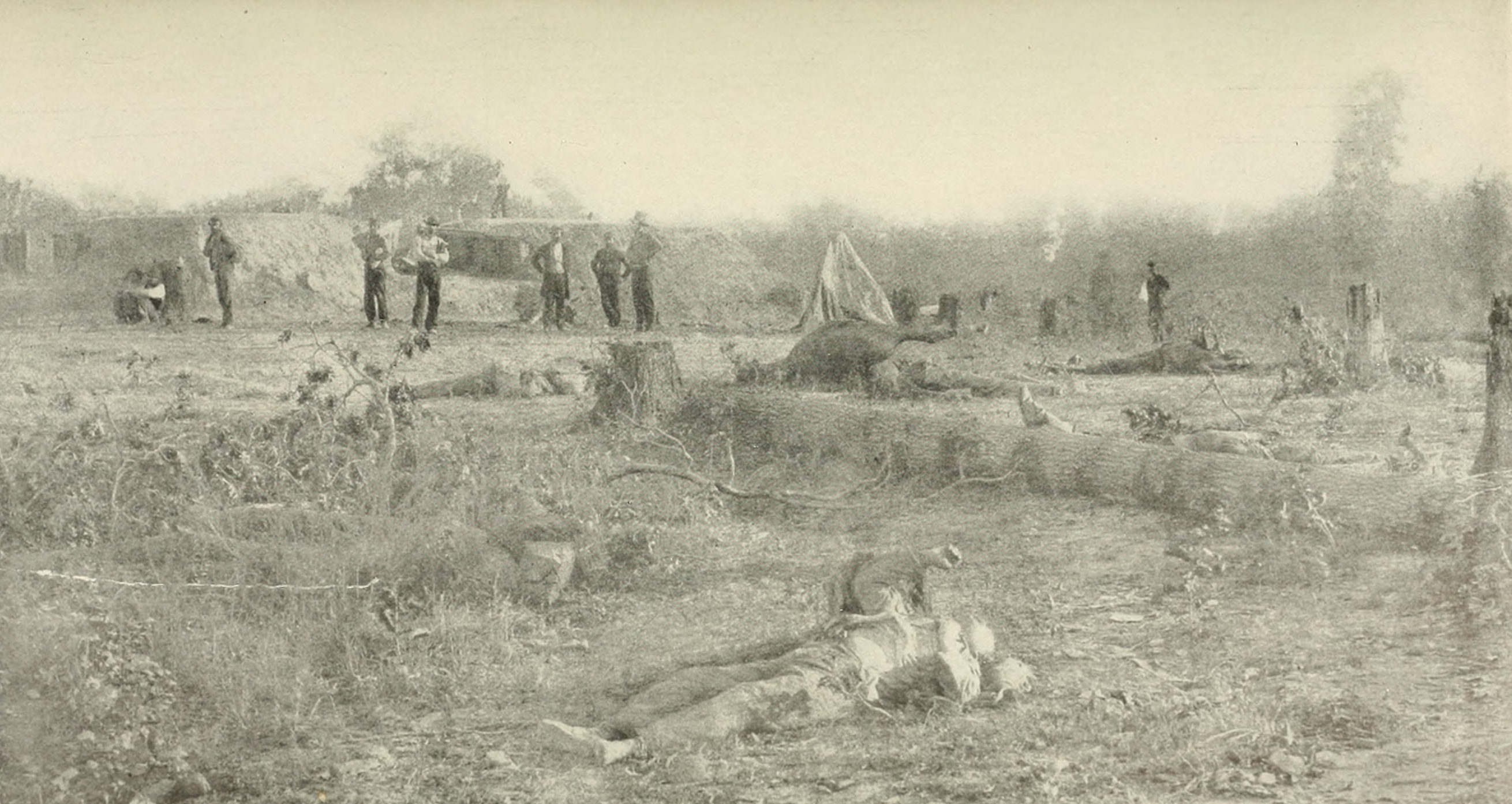
Confederate dead near the parapet of Battery Robinett. Rogers lies in the left background; his dead horse is to the right.

On October 4, the Confederates charged against Battery Robinett and endured heavy casualties, some of which are shown in the picture (right), snapped by a camera on October 5, the day after the battle. Directly in the foreground lies a Confederate soldier who had been swept along in the charge against the ramparts of Battery Robinett, to fall within 50 yds (46 m) of the goal. Even nearer the battery lies the battle-charger of the colonel of the Texas Brigade. And to the left has been laid the body of Colonel Rogers—who leaped from his dying horse, seized the colors, and on foot dashed up the parapet to his death. "Then," wrote one of the Federal defenders (General John Crane, the adjutant of the 17th Wisconsin), "we learned who it was—Colonel William W. Rogers, of the Second Texas. General Rosecrans asked us to uncover his face; he said, 'He was one of the bravest men that ever led a charge. Bury him with military honors and mark his grave so that his friends may claim him.'" The granting of full military honors for Rogers's burial was a ceremony usually reserved for general officers.

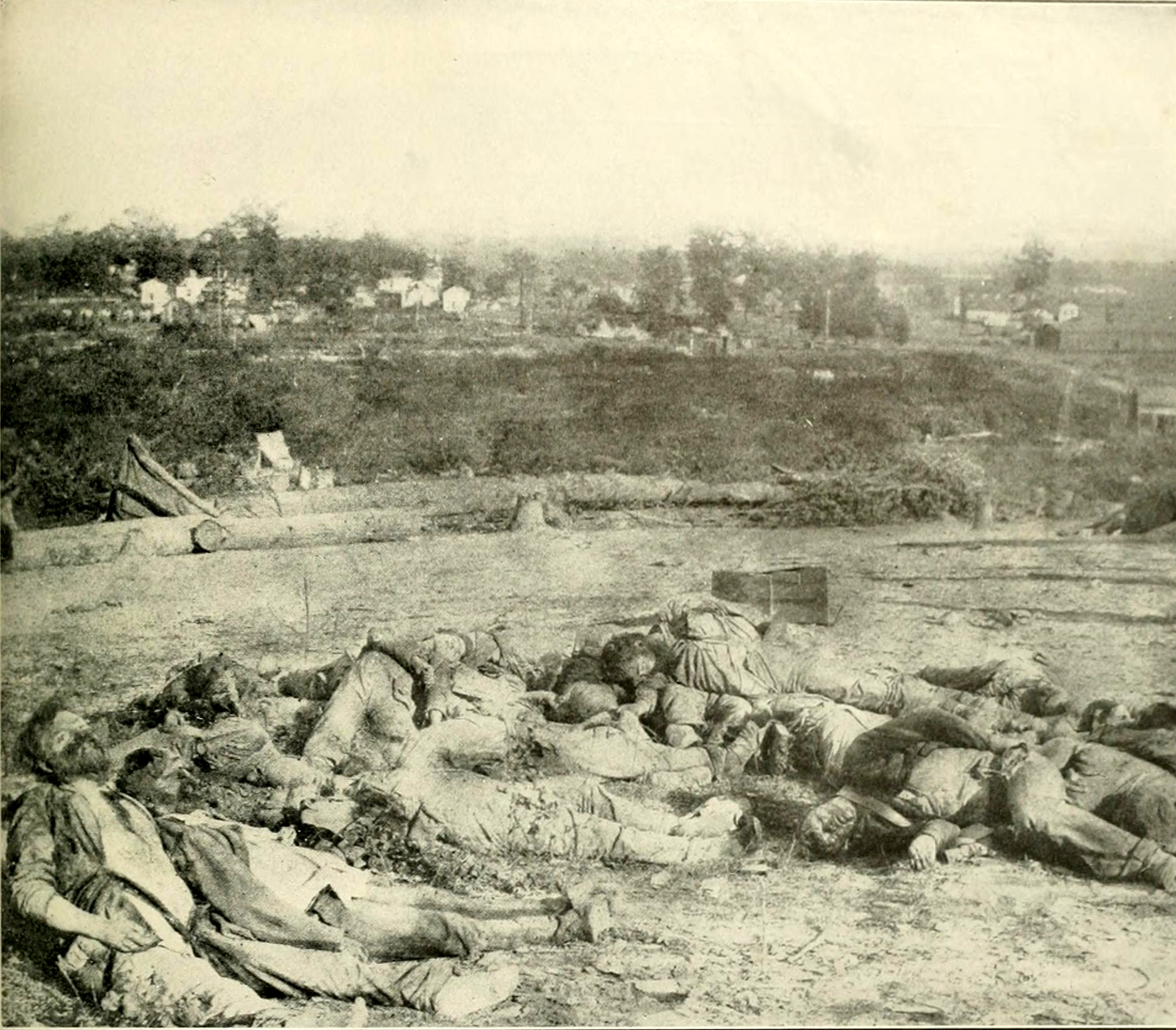
Confederate dead gathered at the bottom of Battery Robinett on October 5. Rogers lies in the left foreground.

Another photograph (right) shows Confederate dead gathered at the bottom of the parapet of Battery Robinett. According to one account, Rogers (right foreground) seized his colors to keep them from falling again and jumped a 5 ft (1.5 m) ditch, leaving his dying horse, and assaulted the ramparts of the battery. He was the fifth standard-bearer to fall in that last charge of the Texas Brigade.

== Personal life ==
On January 15, 1840, Rogers married Martha (née Halbert) of Tuscaloosa, Alabama. They had six children who all became Baylor graduates. His eldest brother, Judge F. M. Rogers, was killed at Donaldsonville, at the head of his company, and his body borne from the field by a domestic servant. His other brother, Captain Tim L. Rogers, of the 7th Mississippi, died at Aberdeen on September 17, 1869, in his thirty-fifth year.

== Sources ==
- Cozzens, Peter (1997). The Darkest Days of the War: The Battles of Iuka and Corinth. Chapel Hill, NC: University of North Carolina Press. pp. 253–255, 261–262, 265.
- Eicher, David J. (2001). The Longest Night: A Military History of the Civil War. New York, NY: Simon & Schuster. p. 378.
- Elson, Henry W.; Barnes, James (1911). Miller, Francis Trevelyan; Lanier, Robert S. (eds.). The Photographic History of the Civil War. Vol. 2. New York, NY: The Review of Reviews Co.
- Johnson, Sid S. (1907). "William P. Rogers". Texans Who Wore the Gray. Vol. 1. pp. 120–121.
- Parrish, T. Michael (November 1, 2017). "Rogers, William Peleg (1819–1862)". Handbook of Texas Online. Texas State Historical Association.
- "News of the Day". The Vicksburg Herald. October 3, 1869. p. 2.
