= Dallas Equal Suffrage Association =

Women's suffrage group in Texas

- Abbreviation: DESA
- Successor: Dallas League of Women Voters
- Formation: March 15, 1913
- Dissolved: October 1919
- Type: Non governmental organization
- Purpose: Women's suffrage

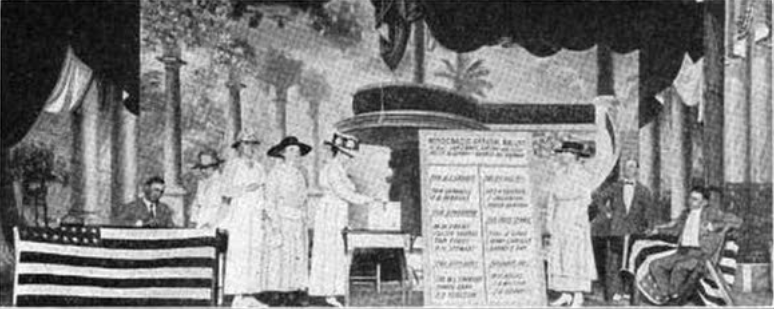
Officers of the Dallas Equal Suffrage League (1918)

The Dallas Equal Suffrage Association (DESA) was an organization formed in Dallas, Texas in 1913 to support the cause of women's suffrage in Texas. DESA was different from many other suffrage organizations in the United States in that it adopted a campaign which matched the social expectations of Dallas at the time. Members of DESA were very aware of the risk of having women's suffrage "dismissed as 'unladylike' and generally disreputable." DESA "took care to project an appropriate public image." Many members used their status as mothers in order to tie together the ideas of motherhood and suffrage in the minds of voters. The second president of DESA, Erwin Armstrong, also affirmed that women were not trying to be unfeminine, stating at an address at a 1914 Suffrage convention that "women are in no way trying to usurp the powers of men, or by any means striving to wrench from man the divine right to rule." The organization also helped smaller, nearby towns to create their own suffrage campaigns. DESA was primarily committed to securing the vote for white women, deliberately ignoring African American women in the process. Their defense of ignoring black voters was justified by having a policy of working towards "only one social reform at a time."

== History ==
The Dallas Equal Suffrage Association had its beginnings on March 15, 1913, when forty-three women from socially elite white families gathered in a private home. Many of the women involved were second-generation suffragists and many had been campaigners for social and health improvements. Margaret Bell Houston, published author and daughter of Sam Houston, Jr., was elected the organization's first president. The second president of DESA was wealthy widow and Mary Hardin–Baylor alumnus Erwin Armstrong, who visited New York and New Jersey in order to gather ideas about conducting successful suffragist campaigns.

DESA hosted the Texas State Women's Suffrage Convention in April 1914. Beginning in October 1913, the Dallas organization had started sponsoring annual suffrage events at each year's Texas State Fair, the most successful of which took place on October 23, 1915, when they hosted delegates from other cities. The delegates rode in an "automobile parade to the fairgrounds" and spoke to people from the platforms of their cars. On "Traveling Salesman Day", which had 112,300 recorded visitors, DESA members also convinced the day's honorees to wear a "bright yellow 'Votes for Women' badge" as they toured exhibitions at the fair. They again hosted a suffrage event in 1916 with nationally recognized suffragists such as Elizabeth Freeman of New York and Florence Cotham of Little Rock.

By 1917, the organization was 600 members strong, many of whom were helping to support the effort in World War I. In spite of member requests to disband the organization and donate all its funds to the war efforts, the DESA remained intact, with its members broadening their patriotic endeavors. On April 10, Dallas suffragists took part in the "Dallas Patriotic Parade" hoisting a large sign proclaiming "Men of America, We Will Do Our Share", which help build support for their cause. That same year, they produced a fund-raising musical comedy stage production in January called The Polynesian Princess. Featuring popular music and entertainment, it helped the DESA raise $800. For three days in March 1917, the DESA conducted the "Suffrage School" sponsored by the National Equal Suffrage Association, meant to educate the public about the benefits of women's suffrage.

The DESA's goal of votes for women was beginning to see substantive support in 1918 from both corporate entities and Texas political leaders. Suffragist Nona Mahoney of the DESA targeted the outspoken opposition, visiting with Texas State Representative Barry Miller in February. She elicited a promise of support from him if she presented him with a petition supporting House Bill 105 ("Granting Women the Right to Vote in all Primary Elections and Nominating Conventions in Texas"), signed by no less than 5,000 Dallas County women. DESA came up with 10,000 signatures and Miller changed his position, even going on to chair legislative caucus overseeing the issue. HB 105 was signed into law on March 26, 1918, giving Texas women the partial right to vote, that is, only at political party conventions and in primary elections. The bill was unique because it had been signed into law as an "emergency measure", but was not in effect until three months later. That gave suffragists only 18 days to register women voters by the state registration deadline of July 11. DESA created a strong campaign to register women voters, going back to the women who had signed the petition, and fanning out through schools and neighborhoods. Among the registrants was someone who said that "she had lived for this day since the Civil War." In the era of racial segregation, it was up to local interpretation of which women could resister to vote. In Dallas, 100 black women were denied registration by the Dallas County sheriff's office; in Waxahachie it took a court ruling to allow black women to register; in Houston there was no issue. Eventually, 16,816 women in Dallas County were registered. White women's votes determined the gubernatorial primary election of 1918, with women voting for Hobby "by a margin of ten to one."

In 1919, Mahoney was elected president of the DESA. She was present that year when Governor, William P. Hobby, signed the February 5 voter referendum for the constitutional state amendment authorizing full suffrage for women. Present at that signing was also Minnie Fisher Cunningham, the president of the Texas Equal Suffrage Association (TESA). Both women received gold pens the governor had used. The referendum for the suffrage amendment was scheduled for vote on May 24, 1919 and the DESA mounted a "well-organized campaign" in favor of the amendment. Support for the amendment was strong, at around 60 percent of voters in favor, in Dallas, even though the amendment was eventually defeated. Mahoney "blamed the vote of foreign-born citizens, chiefly Germans" for the defeat of the amendment. Though a state amendment didn't pass, on June 28, 1919, Texas became the first southern state to ratify the Nineteenth Amendment to the United States Constitution that gave women the right to vote nationwide.

The contributions of DESA affected the opinions of women who were not members of the organization, some of whom marched in the Patriotic Parade or convinced men to vote for women's suffrage. DESA eventually merged with the League of Women Voters in October 1919.

== Notable members ==
- Margaret Bell Houston
- Edith Wilmans
