= List of Recorded Texas Historic Landmarks (Trinity-Zavala) =

The following is a partial list of Recorded Texas Historic Landmarks (RTHLs) arranged by county as designated by the Texas Historical Commission and local county historical commissions in Texas. This page includes RTHLs in the following counties: Trinity, Tyler, Upshur, Upton, Uvalde, Val Verde, Van Zandt, Victoria, Walker, Waller, Ward, Washington, Webb, Wharton, Wheeler, Wichita, Wilbarger, Willacy, Williamson, Wilson, Winkler, Wise, Wood, Yoakum, Young, Zapata, and Zavala.

Recorded Texas Historic Landmarks listed by county
Anderson-Callahan • Cameron-Duval • Eastland-Gray • Grayson-Hudspeth • Hunt-Martin • Mason-Rusk • Sabine-Travis • Trinity-Zavala

KEY

Landmarks with multiple historic designations are colored according to their highest designation within the following hierarchy.

⁕ Listed individually on the National Register of Historic Places (NRHP) as a National Historic Landmark
⁂ Listed on the NRHP as a contributing property of a National Historic Landmark District
† Listed individually on the NRHP
‡ Listed as a contributing property of an NRHP Historic District
§ Listed individually as or as part of a State Historic Site
# Listed individually as or as part of a State Antiquities Landmark

== Trinity County ==
Registered Texas Historic Landmark	Image	Marker number	Physical address	Nearest city	Year designated	Description
I. N. Parker House		7963	304 N. Maple St. 30°56′50″N 95°22′41″W	Trinity	1996	304 North Maple
John Henley Hill House		18373	2005 Pinecrest Rd. 30°55′4″N 95°21′44″W	Trinity	2016	From the town of Trinity, go south on State Highway 19 to East Tatum Street, Turn left (east) go 2/10 mile to Pinecrest Road, turn right (south) and go 9/10 mile to driveway entrance on left.
Old Red Schoolhouse†	More images	15316	100 W. San Jacinto St. 30°56′34″N 95°22′31″W	Trinity	2004	
Ranald McDonald House		7962	401 S. Maple St. 30°56′29″N 95°22′38″W	Trinity	1976	Maple and San Jacinto
Trinity County Courthouse†#		13075	162 W. First St. 31°3′21″N 95°7′33″W	Groveton	2004	162 W First St

== Tyler County ==
Registered Texas Historic Landmark	Image	Marker number	Physical address	Nearest city	Year designated	Description
Burch-Cauble House		11359	1936 FM 2097 30°56′54″N 94°36′31″W	Chester	1964	N of Chester via US 287 E to FM 2097 N 5 mi to Peach Tree Village
Colmesneil, W.T., House		15459	106 S. Pitzer St. 30°54′23″N 94°25′8″W	Colmesneil	2008	106 S. Pitzer
Cooper-Reid Home		11362	702 W. Bluff St. 30°46′33″N 94°25′22″W	Woodville	1968	
David Curlee Enloe House		11365	FM 1745 E of CR 2836 30°56′5″N 94°28′59″W	Colmesneil	1967	FM 1745 4.5 mi W of Colmesneil (east of CR 2836)
Early Law Office		11364	201 S. Beaver St. 30°46′27″N 94°24′49″W	Woodville	1968	Structure has been torn down
James Barclay Place, 1842		11356	10 mi. SW of Woodville	Woodville	1962	
Pine Grove Missionary Baptist Church and School		16586	235 CR 2778 30°50′50″N 94°28′12″W	Dies	2010	0.14 mile N on CR 2778 from the intersection of CR 2778 and FM 1632
Tolar Kitchen		11456	157 Private Rd. 6000 at US 190 W 30°46′17″N 94°26′39″W	Woodville	1964	Located 1.5 mi. W of Woodville at Heritage Museum
Tyler County Courthouse†		12432	104 W. Bluff St. 30°46′30″N 94°24′56″W	Woodville	2000	

== Upshur County ==
Registered Texas Historic Landmark	Image	Marker number	Physical address	Nearest city	Year designated	Description
1925 Gilmer Post Office		12254	119 Simpson St. 32°43′46″N 94°56′37″W	Gilmer	1998	
Ben Phillips Place		11336	West Mountain Cemetery, 8100 US 271 32°36′55″N 94°55′2″W	Union Grove	1964	?
Enon Baptist Church		11309	3063 FM 556 32°46′26″N 95°2′19″W	Gilmer	1966	From Gilmer, take FM 852 5.2 mi NW to intersection w/FM 556, church is at intersection
John O'Byrne Home†	More images	11333	6488 FM 1844 32°35′3″N 94°54′36″W	Union Grove	1964	
Lewis T. Mackey		11327	Union Grove Cemetery, 212 Union Grove Cemetery Rd. 32°33′59″N 94°54′12″W	Union Grove	1964	
McDonald House		11328	1 mi. E on SH 154	Gilmer	1964	
Old Alexander Cook Home		11304	12 mi. NW in Souls Chapel community	Gilmer	1966	12 mi. NW of Gilmer
Old Hart Home		11317	1 mi. from Gilmer	Gilmer	1966	
Pritchett Normal Institute		11338	SH 155 at FM 1404 32°39′47″N 95°0′58″W	Gilmer	1967	On SH 155, at intersection W/FM 1404, about 6 mi. SW of Gilmer
The Ashley Phelps Home		11335	107 N. Tyler St. 32°35′5″N 95°6′32″W	Big Sandy	1982	
Warren-Futrell House		12574	303 Warren St. 32°43′25″N 94°56′47″W	Gilmer	2001	

== Upton County ==
Registered Texas Historic Landmark	Image	Marker number	Physical address	Nearest city	Year designated	Description
Adrian Building		90	S of E. 3rd. St. at Santa Fe St. in Santa Fe Park 31°8′15″N 102°13′5″W	McCamey	1965	On US 67, Eastern edge of McCamey in Santa Fe Park
Bobcat Hills		444	FM 305 S. of Medical Dr. 31°6′45″N 102°12′40″W	McCamey	1967	On FM 305, 7/10 mile S. of intersection w/ FM 1901 in McCamey.
Castle Mountain		755	US 385 7 mi. NW of McCamey 31°18′10″N 102°17′29″W	McCamey	1966	US 385, 7 mi. NW of McCamey
Elliott Ranch		1460	100 W. 5th Ave. 31°13′15″N 101°56′22″W	Rankin	1965	At the Yates Hotel (5th and Main Sts.) Rankin
Mendoza Trail		3330	S of Santa Fe St. near E. 3rd St. in Santa Fe Park 31°8′15″N 102°13′4″W	McCamey	1967	On US 67, Eastern edge of McCamey in Santa Fe Park
Rattlesnake Butte		4205	US 67 10 mi. E. of McCamey 31°9′11″N 102°3′54″W	McCamey	1967	On US 67, about 10 miles E. of McCamey
The Little House on the Corner		5371	111 E. 11th St. 31°7′39″N 102°13′14″W	McCamey	1967	111 E. 11th St. (corner of 11th and Burleson Sts.), McCamey
Yates Hotel		5924	100 W. 5th Ave. 31°13′15″N 101°56′22″W	Rankin	1964	Corner of 5th and Main St., Rankin

== Uvalde County ==
Registered Texas Historic Landmark	Image	Marker number	Physical address	Nearest city	Year designated	Description
Church of the Ascension		858	27318 SH 55 29°32′22″N 100°0′44″W	Montell	1965	From Uvalde: Take SH 55 about 20 miles northwest to Montell; church on west side of 55.
Grand Opera House†	More images	2249	104 W. North St. 29°12′37″N 99°47′12″W	Uvalde	1967	104 North West Street - marker fronts Getty, Uvalde.
Habermacher Home		15528	US 90 3 mi. E of Sabinal 29°19′27″N 99°25′9″W	Sabinal	1963	3 mi E of Sabinal (Ross Kennedy home)
Home of Bertha Dalton		2526	543 N. Getty St. 29°13′6″N 99°47′25″W	Uvalde	1968	Uvalde, 543 North Getty Street.
Joe A. Kelley Home		2759	W of RM 187 approx. 7 mi. S of Utopia 29°32′31″N 99°31′42″W	Utopia	1966	From Utopia, take FM 187 S about 7 mile.
John Nance Garner Home⁕†#	More images	2795	332 N. Park St. 29°12′45″N 99°47′33″W	Uvalde	1962	332 North Park Street, Uvalde.
Nicolas Street School†		17070	332 Nicolas St. 29°12′8″N 99°47′35″W	Uvalde	2011	322 Nicolas St., Uvalde, TX 78801
Old Binion Home		3690	2354 N. RM 187 29°20′17″N 99°28′16″W	Sabinal	1963	from Sabinal, take FM 187 North about 1/2 mile to intersection of FM 187 & FM 127
Old Davenport Home		3719	FM 1051 NW of Uvalde 29°30′46″N 99°31′25″W	Uvalde	1967	From Uvalde, take Hwy. 83 North about 19.5 miles then go NW on FM 1051 about 8 miles to Box 103 (west side of road) - Dry Frio Ranch
Old Patterson Home		15209	RM 187 3 mi. S of Sabinal 29°16′43″N 99°27′35″W	Sabinal	1965	6 mi from Sabinal (W. L. E. Shane Family home)
Old Post Office		3782	CR 363 29°35′52″N 99°48′57″W	Old Waresville	1963	From Utopia, take FM 187, Old Waresville (westward).
Old Rock Store		3800	232 Main St. 29°36′52″N 99°31′37″W	Utopia	1967	East Main Street across from Post Office (Highway 187), Utopia
Old Waresville		3831	RM 187 1.5 mi. S of Utopia 29°36′18″N 99°31′20″W	Utopia	1966	(Marker on Highway 187, 1–2 miles south of Utopia). From Utopia, take Highway 187 South about 1.5 mile to marker.
Schwartz House		12257	524 N. Getty St. 29°13′7″N 99°47′22″W	Uvalde	1997	
Utopia Methodist Church		5618	119 Cypress St. 29°37′3″N 99°31′39″W	Utopia	1967	At end of Cypress Street off (eastward) Highway 187, Utopia
Uvalde County Courthouse	More images	5620	100 N. Getty St. 29°12′36″N 99°47′9″W	Uvalde	1983	Corner of Main (U.S. 90) and Getty: Uvalde town plaza, Uvalde

== Val Verde County ==
Registered Texas Historic Landmark	Image	Marker number	Physical address	Nearest city	Year designated	Description
Brinkley Mansion		13015	512 Qualia Dr. 29°20′25″N 100°54′7″W	Del Rio	2003	512 Qualia
Elks Lodge Hall		13163	330 Pecan St. 29°21′35″N 100°53′51″W	Del Rio	2003	Del Rio, 330 Pecan
Glenn-Dowe House		2191	301 E. Garfield St. 29°21′44″N 100°53′47″W	Del Rio	1985	Garfield on SE corner of intersection with Washington St., Del Rio
Jersey Lily Saloon	More images	2749	Behind Judge Roy Bean Visitor Center on Loop 25 N. at Torres Ave. 29°48′33″N 101°33′38″W	Langtry	1965	Inside Law West Museum walls in Langtry.
Old Perry Building		3777	1308 S. Main St. 29°21′6″N 100°53′53″W	Del Rio	1966	Same location as Roy Bean and Semilole - Negro Scouts at Whitehead Memorial Museum, Main St., Del Rio.
Sacred Heart Catholic Church		4434	320 Mill St. 29°21′32″N 100°53′46″W	Del Rio	1978	320 Mill St. where it crosses East Greenwood, Del Rio
San Felipe Springs		4534	San Felipe Springs Rd. 29°22′24″N 100°52′58″W	Del Rio	1966	On San Felipe Springs Rd. - (off of US 90 W at 1 mile East of Del Rio), Del Rio
The Cassinelli Gin House†		5300	NE corner Academy St. at Pecan St. 29°21′13″N 100°53′48″W	Del Rio	1981	Front corner of Pecan and Academy Sts., Del Rio.

== Van Zandt County ==
Registered Texas Historic Landmark	Image	Marker number	Physical address	Nearest city	Year designated	Description
Bennett Joseph Carter Home		16506	203 E. Pecan St. 32°41′48″N 95°53′5″W	Edgewood	2010	203 E. Pecan, attached to home
Coltharp-Beall House		11388	FM 279 between CR 4819 and CR 2010 32°21′41″N 95°30′15″W	Edom	1964	FM 279, Hamburg
Four Mile Lutheran Church		11412	460 CR 2607 32°29′31″N 96°4′12″W	Mabank	1964	From Canton about 9 mi. W on FM 243 then S on SH 47 about 2.5 mi. then W on SH 90 about 3.5 mi. to CR 2607 about 3/10 mi.
McKain Family Home		11427	307 E. High St. 32°42′37″N 96°0′18″W	Wills Point	1968	
Morton Salt Company Building		11431	801 SH 110 32°39′28″N 95°42′19″W	Grand Saline	1962	1 mi. S of Grand Saline on SH 110
Rose Fountain		16756	N. Main St. at North Commerce St. 32°42′29″N 96°0′30″W	Wills Point	2011	Intersection of State Highway 47 and North Commerce Street
Roseland Plantation Home		11437	2591 SH 64 32°22′52″N 95°30′51″W	Edom	1966	From Tyler about 11 mi. W on US 64 (on south side of road) - Burwell Hambrick / W. C. Windsor home, just west of Smith County line
T. Z. Woodhouse Residence		11449	904 Canton Ave. 32°42′7″N 96°0′3″W	Wills Point	1965	
Van Zandt County Courthouse†	More images	12270	121 E. Dallas St. 32°33′22″N 95°51′47″W	Canton	1999	
William H. Humphries Home†		11421	201 S. Main St. 32°41′47″N 95°53′11″W	Edgewood	1976	

== Victoria County ==
Registered Texas Historic Landmark	Image	Marker number	Physical address	Nearest city	Year designated	Description
1892 Victoria County Courthouse†#	More images	6576	101 N. Bridge St. 28°47′59″N 97°0′26″W	Victoria	1961	Replaced 1961 medallion and plate.
A. Goldman Home		15266	107 S. Liberty St. 28°47′55″N 97°0′20″W	Victoria	1966	
Abraham Levi House†		6100	403 N. Main St. 28°48′9″N 97°0′18″W	Victoria	1965	403 N. Main Street, Victoria.
Alexander Lowe House		6103	701 N. Washington St. 28°48′25″N 97°0′39″W	Victoria	1965	701 N. Washington Street, Victoria.
B. F. Williams House†	More images	6581	401 E. Murray St. 28°47′37″N 97°0′18″W	Victoria	1987	401 E. Murray St., Victoria
Band Stand†	More images	289	N. Main St. at W. Constitution St. in DeLeon Plaza 28°47′59″N 97°0′23″W	Victoria	1965	Constitution Square, Main & Constitution Sts., Victoria
Beck Ranch Headquarters		6535	412 Magruder Dr. 28°50′35″N 97°0′10″W	Victoria	1980	
Billy Kyle Ranch House		6099	0.25 mi. NW on US 87; 0.25 mi. W on private ranch road 28°55′34″N 97°6′32″W	Nursery	1965	From Nursery, take US 87 NW about 1/4 mile, go west at first cattleguard. Follow private road west about 1/4 mile (Private).
Callender Home†	More images	635	404 W. Guadalupe St. 28°48′30″N 97°0′26″W	Victoria	1962	404 W. Guadalupe St., Victoria
Early Victoria Home†		14659	604 N. Craig St. 28°48′22″N 97°0′36″W	Victoria	1971	Proctor-Vandenberg Home? Welder Home? Ledbetter-Phillips-Proctor-Austin-Welder Home?
Fleming-Welder House†		6258	607 N. Craig St. 28°48′22″N 97°0′36″W	Victoria	1996	
Fossati's Delicatessen†	More images	6547	302 S. Main St. 28°47′50″N 97°0′24″W	Victoria	1987	302 Main St., Victoria
Friedrech and Margaretha Hiller House†		15994	3003 N. Vine St. 28°49′18″N 97°0′33″W	Victoria	2009	3003 N. Vine
George H. Hauschild Building†		14524	206 N. Liberty St. 28°48′1″N 97°0′17″W	Victoria	1990	
Hill-O'Connor-Howard House†		6551	802 W. Power Ave. 28°48′18″N 97°0′42″W	Victoria	1981	802 W. Power St., Victoria
Infant Jesus of Prague Catholic Church		6552	FM 445 28°33′6″N 97°0′41″W	McFaddin	1990	FM 445, McFaddin
J. Meredith Tatton House		16919	601 W. North St. 28°48′20″N 97°0′33″W	Victoria	2011	Corner of North Street at Victoria
Jacob Fox House†		6548	708 W. Power Ave. 28°48′18″N 97°0′40″W	Victoria	1985	708 W. Power, Victoria
James A. McFaddin Home†		6554	207 W. Commercial St. 28°48′8″N 97°0′25″W	Victoria	1967	
Joe F. and Amelia Jecker House†		13496	104 N. Liberty St. 28°47′57″N 97°0′18″W	Victoria	2005	104 N. Liberty Street
Judge Alexander Phillips Home†	More images	14102	705 N. Craig St. 28°48′25″N 97°0′36″W	Victoria	1967	
McFaddin Mercantile		3290	FM 445 28°33′12″N 97°0′49″W	McFaddin	1990	FM 445, McFaddin
McFaddin Post Office		3291	FM 445 28°33′12″N 97°0′48″W	McFaddin	1990	FM 445, (20 mi S. of Victoria on US 77)
McNamara House†		3306	502 N. Liberty St. 28°48′9″N 97°0′12″W	Victoria	1965	502 N. Liberty, Victoria
Mundt Place		3534	103 S. Glass St. 28°47′58″N 97°0′30″W	Victoria	1966	Continental Hotel / VFW 4146
Murphy Home		3539	US 87 28°55′10″N 97°5′19″W	Nursery	1966	US 87, Nursery
O'Connor-Proctor Building†	More images	3629	202 N. Main St. 28°48′0″N 97°0′20″W	Victoria	1980	
Old Federal Building†		6546	210 E. Constitution St. 28°47′55″N 97°0′15″W	Victoria	1981	210 E.Constitution St., Victoria
Old Grist Mill†		14443	N. De Leon St. at E. Commercial St. in Memorial Park 28°48′3″N 97°0′5″W	Victoria	1962	
Old L.D. Heaton Home		6550	307 S. Bridge St. 28°47′50″N 97°0′30″W	Victoria	1966	307 S. Bridge St., Victoria
Pela House†		12277	309 E. Santa Rosa St. 28°47′50″N 97°0′14″W	Victoria	1998	
Phillips-Sale House		6558	701 N. Craig St. 28°48′25″N 97°0′37″W	Victoria	1967	
Power Home		13867	307 S. William St. 28°47′46″N 97°0′20″W	Victoria	1966	
Proctor House†		4129	507 N. Glass St. 28°48′14″N 97°0′23″W	Victoria	1985	
Regan House†		4234	507 S. De Leon St. 28°47′39″N 97°0′18″W	Victoria	1996	507 S. De Leon, Victoria
Robert H. and Pauline Clark House†		13050	317 N. Main St. 28°48′6″N 97°0′19″W	Victoria	2004	317 N. Main
Robert L. Dabney House		17973	801 N. Craig St. 28°48′27″N 97°0′34″W	Victoria	2014	
Sengele Home		14422	210 E. Forest St. 28°47′59″N 97°0′15″W	Victoria	1962	
St. Mary's Catholic Church†	More images	6566	101 W. Church St. 28°47′48″N 97°0′27″W	Victoria	1964	100 W. Church St., Victoria
The Woodhouse Home†		5898	609 N. Wheeler St. 28°48′11″N 97°0′1″W	Victoria	1983	609 N. Wheeler St., Victoria
Thurmond Building		6571	901 S. Bridge St. 28°47′33″N 97°0′58″W	Victoria	1980	901 S. Bridge St., Victoria
Victoria Pumping Station†		16922	1201 W. Stayton Ave. 28°48′22″N 97°0′1″W	Victoria	2011	

== Walker County ==
Registered Texas Historic Landmark	Image	Marker number	Physical address	Nearest city	Year designated	Description
Angier Farm		18490	1556 Southwood Dr. 30°40′37″N 95°29′4″W	Huntsville	2016	
Austin College Building†#		8426	1700 Sam Houston Ave. 30°42′56″N 95°33′0″W	Huntsville	1964	Near the intersection of 17th St. and University on the Sam Houston State University campus, Huntsville.
Boettcher House		8431	2020 Ave. N1/2 30°42′42″N 95°33′20″W	Huntsville	1991	2020 Ave. N 1/2; Huntsville.
Eastham-Thomason House		8443	906 Ave. M 30°43′36″N 95°33′14″W	Huntsville	1989	906 Ave. M; Huntsville.
Farris Chapel Methodist Church		8448	1651 FM 1791 30°36′17″N 95°43′29″W	Huntsville	1965	From the intersection of SH 30 and IH-45 (Huntsville), take SH 30 W approximately 3 miles to FM 1791; then SW on FM 1791 approximately 10.5 miles. Old Richards Road southwest of Huntsville.
Gibbs-Powell House#		8454	1228 11th St. 30°43′27″N 95°33′10″W	Huntsville	1989	1228 11th Street; Huntsville.
Jardine-Brown House		8460	4621 FM 1374 30°37′57″N 95°36′1″W	Huntsville	1968	From the intersection of FM 1374 and IH-45 take FM 1374 SW approximately 5.3 miles.
Josey Boy Scouts Lodge		16519	2201 Ave. M 30°42′33″N 95°33′6″W	Huntsville	2010	Southwest corner of intersection of Sam Houston Avenue (Highway 75) and 22nd Street
Old Gibbs Store		8455	1116 11th St. 30°43′26″N 95°33′5″W	Huntsville	1964	1116 Cedar Street; Huntsville; 1114-18 11th St.
Peabody Library Building#	More images	8469	1700 Sam Houston Ave. 30°42′56″N 95°32′58″W	Huntsville	1990	Near the corner of 12th and Avenue J, on the Sam Houston State University campus; Huntsville.
Powell Sanctuary		18181	700 blk. Ninth St. in Oakwood Cemetery 30°43′38″N 95°32′43″W	Huntsville	2015	
Pritchett House		12490	1322 Ave. O 30°43′15″N 95°33′24″W	Huntsville	2001	
St. Joseph's Catholic Church		8472	101 Elmore St. 30°32′9″N 95°28′52″W	New Waverly	1975	corner of Elmore and Walker streets
Steamboat House⁕†#		8474	1402 19th St. 30°42′52″N 95°33′13″W	Huntsville	1964	Sam Houston Memorial Museum
Woodland, Home of Sam Houston⁕†#	More images	8482	1402 19th St. 30°42′53″N 95°33′10″W	Huntsville	1962	On the Sam Houston Memorial Museum and Education Center grounds (in front of Sam Houston home); Huntsville.
Wynne House		14377	1428 11th St. 30°43′27″N 95°33′20″W	Huntsville	2007	

== Waller County ==
Registered Texas Historic Landmark	Image	Marker number	Physical address	Nearest city	Year designated	Description
Ahrenbeck-Urban Home		9373	1203 13th St. 30°5′37″N 96°4′58″W	Hempstead	1980	corner of 13th St. & Lafayette, Hempstead
Donigan House		9379	906 Cooper St. 29°47′8″N 95°57′13″W	Brookshire	1985	Northeast corner of 5th and Cooper, Brookshire. Waller County Historical Museum.
Frey-Benignus House		9384	W of Blinka Rd. 1 mi. N of Richard Frey Rd. 29°58′38″N 95°58′38″W	Brookshire vicinity	1990	From Brookshire take FM 362 north to Richard Frey, then west to Blinka Rd, then north 1 mile, Brookshire vicinity
Liendo Plantation†	More images	9395	Wycliff Chapel Rd. E of FM 1488 30°5′47″N 96°1′47″W	Hempstead	1964	5 mi. N of Hempstead on FM 1488 to Wycliff Chapel Rd.
Pine Island Baptist Church		8106	36573 Brumlow Rd. 30°3′30″N 96°0′39″W	Hempstead	1965	4 miles east of Hempsted on 290, then south on Pine Island to junction with Brumlow
Reid's Prairie Baptist Church		8107	30414 FM 362 30°13′11″N 95°56′28″W	Waller	1965	FM 362 15 miles north of Waller
St. Francis Episcopal Church		8108	204 Dooley St. 30°5′14″N 95°59′34″W	Prairie View	1962	

== Ward County ==
Registered Texas Historic Landmark	Image	Marker number	Physical address	Nearest city	Year designated	Description
Christ The King Catholic Church/Sands Art Center		844	1000 N. Main Ave. 31°36′8″N 102°53′47″W	Monahans	1992	1000 N. Main (also N SH 18 ) (at corner of Main and J Sts.) Monahans
Grandfalls Union Church		2252	103 Ave. D 31°20′23″N 102°51′7″W	Grandfalls	1966	At the intersection of SH 18 and SH 329 in Grandfalls
Holman House		2510	Million Barrel Museum at 1500 E. Sealy Ave. 31°35′41″N 102°52′42″W	Monahans	1966	Million Barrel Museum, 400 Museum Blvd off E. Sealy Avenue (US 80)
Old Railroad Section House		3788	PR 41 1.5 mi. N. of entrance to Monahans Sandhills State Park, 2500 I-20 E. Exit 86 31°38′5″N 102°48′55″W	Monahans	1965	About 6 miles E. of Monahans on US 80/I-20 in Sandhills State Park. aka Sand Hills Section House.
Old Ward County Bank		3830	NE corner Mackey Ave. at San Marcos St. 31°27′34″N 103°23′35″W	Barstow	1962	Mackey Ave., Barstow
Water Improvement District No. 2 Office		5724	SW corner Ave. D at 2nd St. 31°20′26″N 102°51′11″W	Grandfalls	1966	On SH 18, near intersection of SH 18 and 2nd St. at the Chamber of commerce Grandfalls

== Washington County ==
Registered Texas Historic Landmark	Image	Marker number	Physical address	Nearest city	Year designated	Description
Allcorn-Kokemoor Farmstead†		16820	4625 Old Independence Rd. 30°13′22″N 96°22′51″W	Brenham	2011	4625 Old Independence Road, Brenham
Anson Jones Home§	More images	15324	23400 PR 12 30°19′21″N 96°9′0″W	Brenham	1962	(Barrington Farm, Washington-on-the-Brazos)
Applewhite House†		8289	SE corner Church St. at Chestnut St. 30°8′35″N 96°15′9″W	Chappell Hill	1968	At Church and Chesnut Streets, Chappell Hill.
Bassett and Bassett Banking House†‡	More images	8297	222 E. Main St. 30°10′3″N 96°23′46″W	Brenham	1985	222 E. Main, Brenham
Blinn College Main Building†‡	More images	8303	800 College Ave. 30°9′34″N 96°24′18″W	Brenham	1962	800 block of College Ave., on old Main Bldg. Blinn College Campus, Brenham.
B'nai Abraham Synagogue†		8293	302 N. Park St. 30°10′5″N 96°23′53″W	Brenham	1965	302 N. Park Street, Brenham
Brown's Prairie School and Building		18124	20322 FM 1155 30°17′19″N 96°9′57″W	Washington	2015	
Burton Cafe‡	More images	8314	12513 Washington St. 30°10′55″N 96°35′47″W	Burton	1992	Washington St. near intersection with Main, Burton.
Burton Depot‡	More images	8316	507 N. Railroad St. 30°10′53″N 96°35′48″W	Burton	1991	Railroad St. (at Washington), Burton
Burton Farmers Gin†	More images	8317	307 N. Main St. 30°10′40″N 96°35′38″W	Burton	1988	On Main St. near intersection with Mulberry, Burton.
Burton High School†	More images	17597	917 N. Main St. 30°11′2″N 96°35′53″W	Burton	2013	Main Street at FM 390
Farmers State Bank and Reinstein Store‡	More images	16205	5060 Main St. 30°8′32″N 96°15′26″W	Chappell Hill	2009	
First Christian Church of Brenham‡		8333	306 Cottonwood St. 30°10′12″N 96°23′44″W	Brenham	1984	306 Cottonwood, Brenham
First Public High School in Brenham†		8335	606 E. Alamo St. 30°10′3″N 96°23′35″W	Brenham	1969	606 E. Alamo, Brenham. Marker may be missing.
Former Bank Building of Giddings & Giddings‡		8338	116 S. Park St. 30°10′1″N 96°23′54″W	Brenham	1971	116 S. Park St. (corner of S. Park and E. Alamo), Brenham.
Friedens Church of Washington, UCC§		17883	20301 FM 1155 East 30°17′18.99″N 96°10′0.01″W	Washington-on-the-Brazos, Texas	2014	
Fritz Paul and Emma Schroeder House†		18028	9799 Palestine Rd. 30°16′51″N 96°18′29″W	Independence	2014	1 mile east of Sandy Hill Church on Palestine Road - property north of road.
Gantt-Jones House†		8336	FM 2780 on W side 1.1 mi. N of FM 1697 30°12′19″N 96°37′4″W	Burton	1976	From intersection of FM 1697 and FM 2780 in Burton, go N on FM 2780 about 1.1 mile to home on W side of road.
George Clark Red Homestead†		14253	FM 390 30°16′55″N 96°27′27″W	Gay Hill	1965	
Giddings-Stone House†		8339	204 E. Stone St. 30°8′57″N 96°23′31″W	Brenham	1991	Just off E. Stone St., at the corner of Century Circle and Heritage Drive, Brenham.
Giddings-Wilkin House†	More images	8340	805 Crockett St. 30°10′25″N 96°23′29″W	Brenham	1976	805 Crockett St., Brenham
Hasskarl House-"Far View"		8346	1804 S. Park St. 30°9′9″N 96°23′41″W	Brenham	1994	1804 S. Park St., Brenham
Hatfield Plantation†		15309	FM 912 near FM 1155 30°18′28″N 96°10′34″W	Washington	1966	Off FM 912
Jacob Haller House‡		8345	4922 Main St. 30°8′39″N 96°15′27″W	Chappell Hill	1969	N. Main St. (2 blocks N of Chesnut), Chappell Hill.
James Walker Log House†		16819	4800 Old Chappell Hill Rd. 30°8′35″N 96°15′12″W	Brenham	2011	3 mi. E of Blue Bell Road on Chappell Hill Road
John Sterling Smith House†		8397	Chestnut St. W of Church St. 30°8′35″N 96°15′9″W	Chappell Hill	1990	On Chesnut St. near intersection with Church St., Chappell Hill.
Julius Yanch Home‡		8409	4925 Main St. 30°8′39″N 96°15′25″W	Chappell Hill	1968	N. Main St. (2 blocks N of Chesnut), Chappell Hill.
Liberty Baptist Church		12996	10655 FM 50 30°19′22″N 96°20′49″W	Independence	2003	10655 FM 50
Lockhart Plantation		8366	FM 1371 W of US 290 30°7′58″N 96°14′39″W	Chappell Hill	1964	On FM 1371, 1 mi. E of Chappell Hill.
Louis Lehmann House		14297	2470 S. Berlin Rd. 30°8′46″N 96°27′53″W	Brenham	2008	2470 S. Berlin Rd.
Margaret Lea Houston Home†	More images	8352	SE corner FM 390 at Hood Hotel Rd. 30°19′8″N 96°20′41″W	Independence	1965	1 block E of FM 50/FM 390 intersection, on S side of FM 390, Independence.
Methodist Church†		8370	5195 Church St. 30°8′29″N 96°15′9″W	Chappell Hill	1967	On Church St. by Public School, Chappell Hill.
Mill Creek Farm		15148	11456 Old Mill Creek Rd. 30°10′26″N 96°34′13″W	Brenham	1966	7 mi W on US 290 (H. G. Nelms home)
Old Rock Store‡		8383	5070 Main St. 30°8′31″N 96°15′26″W	Chappell Hill	1971	At Main and Cedar Streets (W side of road), Chappell Hill.
Pampell-Day Homestead†		8376	409 W. Alamo St. 30°9′56″N 96°24′10″W	Brenham	1966	409 W. Alamo St., Brenham
Permelia Haynie Home‡		8347	4890 Main St. 30°8′40″N 96°15′27″W	Chappell Hill	1970	N. Main St. (2 blocks N of Chesnut St.), Chappell Hill.
Pleasant Hill School		18339	500 Pleasant Hill School Rd. 30°6′23″N 96°23′38″W	Brenham	2016	4 miles south of Brenham on Hwy 36; Right on Pleasant Hill School Road; 1/4 mile to site
Providence Baptist Church‡		8378	5175 Main St. 30°8′26″N 96°15′25″W	Chappell Hill	1967	At Main and Providence Sts. (E side of road), Chappell Hill.
Reue-Eickenhorst House†		12991	0.5 mi. W of FM 50 on FM 2621 30°15′3″N 96°21′20″W	Brenham	2002	Brenham, FM 2621, 0.5 mi. E of SH 50
Ross-Carroll House‡		8384	515 E. Main St. 30°10′7″N 96°23′37″W	Brenham	1992	515 E. Main, Brenham
Sacred Heart Catholic Church		12286	Sawmill Rd. at Sacred Heart Rd. 30°4′28″N 96°33′5″W	Brenham	1999	12 mi. SW of Brenham on FM 389 to Latium; .9 mi. E on Sacred Heart Road
Schmid Bros. Building‡	More images	8392	107 W. Commerce St. 30°9′57″N 96°23′53″W	Brenham	1993	103 W. Commerce, Brenham
Schuerenberg House†	More images	8393	503 W. Alamo St. 30°9′55″N 96°24′12″W	Brenham	1996	503 W. Alamo St., Brenham
Seelhorst-Lehrmann House†		8394	702 Seelhorst St. 30°9′56″N 96°23′28″W	Brenham	1973	402 Seelhorst St., Brenham.
Southern Pacific Freight Depot†‡		14930	306 S. Market St. 30°9′57″N 96°23′46″W	Brenham	2003	
St. Peter's Episcopal Church		8389	2310 Airline Dr. 30°8′47″N 96°23′43″W	Brenham	1965	At the corner of Hillcrest and Airline Roads, Brenham. (Replica?)
Steiner & Dallmeyer Building‡	More images	8398	600 N. Main St. 30°10′57″N 96°35′46″W	Burton	1989	Corner of Main & Washington Sts., Burton.
The Brown-Woodlief Log House		14398	5000 Krueger Rd. 30°15′57″N 96°11′16″W	Washington	1973	3.5 mi. SW via Hwy 90 and FM 1155, then 1.2 mi on local road
The Hutchinson-Korth Home		15404	5000 Krueger Rd. 30°16′1″N 96°11′14″W	Washington	1972	NE of Chappell Hill, 9.6 mi on FM 1155, then 1.2 mi on local road
The Wood-Hughes House†		8408	614 S. Austin St. 30°9′43″N 96°23′56″W	Brenham	1974	614 S. Austin St., Brenham
W. W. Browning House†	More images	8312	Private drive 0.5 mi. S of Browning St. near FM 1371 30°7′34″N 96°15′27″W	Chappell Hill	1983	1/2 mile S of US 290 via private drive, Chappell Hill.
Washington County Courthouse†‡	More images	8401	100 E. Main St. 30°10′1″N 96°23′51″W	Brenham	1985	105 E. Main between S. Park and Baylor Sts., Brenham.
Waverly†		8395	E on FM 2447 30°8′42″N 96°15′3″W	Chappell Hill	1967	On FM 2447, E of downtown Chappell Hill.
Wittbecker-Weiss House‡		8406	600 Third St. 30°9′41″N 96°24′13″W	Brenham	1995	600 W. Third St., Brenham
Witte-Williams House		8407	6007 Jaeger Rd. 30°5′53″N 96°36′36″W	Greenvine	1974	From Greenvine, take CR 2 (Wickel Rd.) 2.3 mi. to Mayer Cem. Rd., go S about 1.6 mi. to Jaeger Rd., go W about 2/10 mi. to house on N side of road (128 Jaeger Rd.).

== Webb County ==
Registered Texas Historic Landmark	Image	Marker number	Physical address	Nearest city	Year designated	Description
August C. and Julia Richter Mansion		234	1906 Houston St. 27°30′27″N 99°30′52″W	Laredo	1985	1906 Houston Street
Benavides-Herrera House‡		12387	802 Grant St. 27°30′10″N 99°30′14″W	Laredo	2000	
Biggio-Kowalski-De La Garza House		405	1620 Farragut St. 27°30′21″N 99°30′44″W	Laredo	1996	1620 Farragut, Laredo
Capitol, Republic of the Rio Grande‡	More images	704	1001 Zaragoza St. 27°30′7″N 99°30′21″W	Laredo	1965	1000 Zaragoza St. on St. Augustin St. south side
Casa Ortiz‡		744	915 Zaragoza St. 27°30′8″N 99°30′19″W	Laredo	1964	915 Zaragoza St
Casa Vidaurri‡		746	202 Flores Ave. 27°30′8″N 99°30′24″W	Laredo	1964	202 Flores Ave. west side St. Augustine Sq.
Casa Zaragoza		14164	702 Zaragoza St. 27°30′8″N 99°30′12″W	Laredo	1963	Property was demolished; state marker no longer remains.
Fort McIntosh Barracks‡		1997	Laredo Community College Fort McIntosh Campus 27°30′23″N 99°31′10″W	Laredo	1962	on administration building
Juan Francisco Farías Residence		15800	409 San Bernardo Ave. 27°30′14″N 99°30′16″W	Laredo	2009	
Leyendecker House‡		12290	204 Flores Ave. 27°30′9″N 99°30′24″W	Laredo	1999	
San Augustine Cathedral‡	More images	5029	201 Agustin Ave. 27°30′9″N 99°30′19″W	Laredo	1963	Laredo - on St. Augustine Square - east side
St. Augustine Parochial School‡		12441	203 San Agustin Ave. 27°30′10″N 99°30′19″W	Laredo	2000	
Zuniga House		5963	902 Market St. 27°30′15″N 99°29′15″W	Laredo	1996	902 Market Street, Laredo

== Wharton County ==
Registered Texas Historic Landmark	Image	Marker number	Physical address	Nearest city	Year designated	Description
Boling United Methodist Church		14496	607 Texas Ave. 29°15′46″N 95°56′21″W	Boling	2003	
Captain W. E. Heard Home		726	0.4 mi. E of FM 102 on FM 1161 29°24′11″N 96°14′1″W	Egypt	1962	4/10 mile E. of Egypt (and FM 102) on FM 1161, Egypt
El Campo Library Building		1408	201 W. Monseratte St. 29°11′42″N 96°16′13″W	El Campo	1990	201 W. Monseratte, El Campo
G. C. and Clara Mick Home		2086	7 mi. SE on FM 1301 29°16′30″N 95°57′39″W	Wharton vicinity	1965	7 miles SE of Wharton on FM 1301, in Iago.(on W Side of 1301)
Glen Flora Plantation		2189	FM 640 one mile N of FM 102 29°21′2″N 96°10′24″W	Wharton	1967	1 mile N. of Intersection of FM 102 & FM 640 on FM 640, Wharton
Joseph A. Hamilton House†		2854	325 N. Richmond Rd. 29°18′53″N 96°6′9″W	Wharton	1984	325 N. Richmond St., Wharton
Judge Edwin Hawes House†		2879	309 N. Resident St. 29°18′45″N 96°5′50″W	Wharton	1982	309 N. Resident St., Wharton
Shanghai Pierce Ranch House		4658	Pierce Ranch SE of FM 526 29°14′16″N 96°11′11″W	Pierce	1967	1 mile S.E of Pierce on Pierce Ranch (entrance to ranch is on FM 526, across from Post Office)
Wharton County Courthouse‡	More images	14041	100 S. Fulton St. 29°18′38″N 96°6′3″W	Wharton	2007	100 E. Milam St.

== Wheeler County ==
Registered Texas Historic Landmark	Image	Marker number	Physical address	Nearest city	Year designated	Description
Britt Rock House		14563	Private road 1.2 mi. E of FM 592, 2.4 mi. N of SH 152 35°28′29″N 100°6′4″W	Wheeler	1964	northeast of Wheeler
Farmers and Merchants State Bank		15573	127 N. Main St. 35°12′55″N 100°14′58″W	Shamrock	1968	southwest corner of Main and 2nd streets
Frye-Puryear Home		2076	E of CR 22, 1.5 mi. N of SH 152 35°28′46″N 100°8′22″W	Wheeler	1964	From Wheeler, take S.H. 152 about 7.5 miles east; turn north onto county road 22 about 1.5 miles to private ranch driveway on east side of road
Old Rock House		1912	Private ranch road S of CR H 1 mi. W of SH 152 35°29′40″N 100°25′22″W	Mobeetie	1962	From Wheeler, take S.H. 152 northwest about 11 miles to county road "H"; take road about 1 mile to private ranch entrance (Jim Fleming Ranch)
Old Wheeler County Jail		3834	W end Olaughlin St. 35°30′36″N 100°26′33″W	Mobeetie	1965	In front of old jail in Old Mobeetie, south of S.H. 152
Rock Barn		3955	Stiles Ranch Rd. 2 mi. N of SH 152 10 mi. E of Wheeler 35°28′8″N 100°4′46″W	Wheeler	1967	From Wheeler, take S.H. 152 east about 10 miles; turn north onto private drive to barn site, about 2 miles on private property (Patton Ranch)
Rock School		4319	On private road 0.5 mi. E of FM 592, 2 mi. N of SH 152 35°28′35″N 100°6′40″W	Wheeler	1964	From Wheeler take SH 152 9 miles east, turn north on FM 592, continue about 2 miles to private drive onto ranch, head east about .5 miles to school.
Shamrock Water Tower		15350	101 S. Main St. 35°12′51″N 100°14′58″W	Shamrock	2008	intersection of Main St. & E. Railroad Ave.
The Millie Porter House		3384	901 Main St. 35°26′23″N 100°16′24″W	Wheeler	1968	901 Main Street-Wheeler
Tower Building†	More images	5513	101 E. 12th St. 35°13′36″N 100°14′55″W	Shamrock	1994	101 E. 12th Street-Shamrock
Wheeler County Courthouse		11970	401 Main St. 35°26′41″N 100°16′22″W	Wheeler	2000	
Wheeler County Jail		5780	NW corner E. Texas Ave. at S. Alan L. Bean Blvd. 35°26′40″N 100°16′21″W	Wheeler	1965	Intersection of Alan Bean & Texas Streets-Wheeler

== Wichita County ==
Registered Texas Historic Landmark	Image	Marker number	Physical address	Nearest city	Year designated	Description
Electra State Bank		1447	101 W. Cleveland Ave. 34°1′48″N 98°55′7″W	Electra	1966	101 West Cleveland Avenue, Electra
First Baptist Church of Wichita Falls	More images	1684	1200 Ninth St. 33°54′31″N 98°29′47″W	Wichita Falls	1982	1200 9th Street, Wichita Falls
First United Methodist Church of Wichita Falls	More images	1900	909 Tenth St. 33°54′31″N 98°29′32″W	Wichita Falls	1983	909 Tenth Street, Wichita Falls
Frank Kell Home†	More images	2049	900 Bluff St. 33°54′27″N 98°29′49″W	Wichita Falls	1980	900 Bluff, Wichita Falls
Grand Theatre		13670	114 N. Waggoner St. 34°1′50″N 98°55′8″W	Electra	2006	114 N. Waggoner
Hodges-Hardy House†	More images	2506	1100 Travis St. 33°54′26″N 98°28′12″W	Wichita Falls	1984	1100 Travis, Wichita Falls
Home of Monroe Dodson		2541	403 N. Ave. E 34°6′2″N 98°34′16″W	Burkburnett	1970	near East Main & 5th Street
J. A. Kemp Wholesale Grocery Building‡	More images	12295	500 Eighth St. 33°54′50″N 98°29′21″W	Wichita Falls	1997	
Joe and Lois Perkins Estate†		18216	3301 Harrison St. 33°52′44″N 98°30′45″W	Wichita Falls	2015	
Kell Field Air Terminal	More images	2911	1226 Heritage Way, Sheppard Air Force Base 33°59′6″N 98°30′53″W	Wichita Falls	1981	Sheppard Air Force Base, Wichita Falls. Enter at main gate and continue on the road to Motor Pool Drive. This is an active military base.
The Anderson House		158	912 Burnett St. 33°54′27″N 98°29′43″W	Wichita Falls	1980	912 Burnett, Wichita Falls
Tom Lloyd Burnett Home		5503	400 W. Alameda Ave. 33°57′21″N 98°40′21″W	Iowa Park	1983	400 West Alameda, Lowa Park
Weeks Mansion†		5741	2112 Kell Blvd. 33°53′29″N 98°30′47″W	Wichita Falls	1978	Intersection of Harrison and Kell, Wichita Falls.
Wichita Falls Women's Forum		5808	2120 Speedway Ave. 33°53′18″N 98°30′48″W	Wichita Falls	1980	2120 Speedway, Wichita Falls

== Wilbarger County ==
Registered Texas Historic Landmark	Image	Marker number	Physical address	Nearest city	Year designated	Description
Doans' Adobe Building†		5323	FM 2916 at FM 924 34°20′38″N 99°15′20″W	Doan's Community	1962	From Vernon, take US 283 North about 13 miles to FM 2916 and follow FM 2916 east to Doan's Community.
Vernon Drugstore		5643	1630 Main St. 34°9′14″N 99°17′5″W	Vernon	1966	1704 Main St., Vernon
W. D. Berry Home		5669	2429 Texas St. 34°9′15″N 99°17′31″W	Vernon	1981	2429 Texas St., Vernon
Waggoner-Hicks House		5702	2760 Paradise St. 34°9′4″N 99°17′42″W	Vernon	1988	2760 Paradise St., Vernon

== Willacy County ==
Registered Texas Historic Landmark	Image	Marker number	Physical address	Nearest city	Year designated	Description
Old Lyford High School Building†	More images	3760	E side Simon Gomez Rd. N of High School Cir. 26°24′37″N 97°47′48″W	Lyford	1985	Lyford, Simon Gomez Ave.
Willacy County Courthouse†		18553	546 W. Hidalgo Ave. 26°28′57″N 97°47′15″W	Raymondville	2016	Willacy County Courthouse grounds, southeast corner

== Williamson County ==
Registered Texas Historic Landmark	Image	Marker number	Physical address	Nearest city	Year designated	Description
A. A. & Mary Spacek House		12308	204 S. Rio Grande St. 30°42′58″N 97°26′44″W	Granger	1999	
A. J. and Carolina Anderson House		12591	602 E. Liberty Ave. 30°30′41″N 97°40′25″W	Round Rock	2001	
A. M. Brown Cabin		9036	6 mi. W near RM 2243 in Garey Park	Georgetown	1974	FM 2243, 6 miles west of Georgetown
A.S. Mason House		13802	600 S. Bagdad Rd. 30°34′1″N 97°51′58″W	Leander	1983	Bagdad Road, across from city park, S of FM 2243 and W of US 183
A. W. Sillure House†		9338	1414 Ash St. 30°37′50″N 97°40′23″W	Georgetown	1990	1414 Ash St., Georgetown
Amos-Godbey House†‡		15136	1408 Olive St. 30°37′53″N 97°40′1″W	Georgetown	1988	
Andrew J. Palm House‡	More images	9316	208 E. Main St. 30°30′34″N 97°40′39″W	Round Rock	1978	Palm House Museum/Chamber of Commerce
Barker House		12298	1113 Ledbetter St. 30°30′52″N 97°41′38″W	Round Rock	1998	
Booth House		9034	2112 W. Lake Dr. 30°34′38″N 97°26′1″W	Taylor	1992	2112 Lake Drive, Taylor
Bryson Stagecoach Stop†		9038	SH 29, 1 mi. W 30°40′40″N 97°56′37″W	Liberty Hill	1981	SH 29, 1 mi. W of Liberty Hill
Burcham House†		9039	1310 S. College St. 30°37′54″N 97°40′19″W	Georgetown	1988	1310 College, Georgetown
C.B. and Lilburn Atkinson House†		13699	911 Walnut St. 30°38′8″N 97°40′13″W	Georgetown	2006	911 S. Walnut St.
C.C. and Mattie Hughes Cody House‡		13444	304 E. University Ave. 30°37′58″N 97°40′29″W	Georgetown	2005	304 E University
Cabin from Gabriel Mills Area		9097	3300 E. Palm Valley Blvd. 30°31′39″N 97°38′4″W	Round Rock	1976	Building and marker moved 2005 to Old Settlers Park, Round Rock (formerly Austin Ave, Georgetown).
Caldwell-Palm House		9043	4307 Teravista Club Dr. 30°34′25″N 97°40′17″W	Round Rock	1965	
Cooper Sansom House‡		14160	1252 S. Main St. 30°37′51″N 97°40′38″W	Georgetown	1988	
David H. and Jerusha Dyches McFadin House†	More images	9306	FM 1331 E of SH 95 30°38′18″N 97°25′33″W	Circleville	1965	On FM 1331, Circleville vicinity
Doak Home		9047	600 W. Seventh St. 30°34′24″N 97°25′0″W	Taylor	1967	600 W. 7th St., Taylor
Dog Run Log Cabin		9048	S of CR 202 E of CR 207 30°43′55″N 97°54′26″W	Liberty Hill	1968	10 mi. N of Liberty Hill via SH 29/US 183, off local road (Dr. Michael Collins property)
Early Church		9084	100 Suttles St. 30°50′18″N 97°47′21″W	Florence	1970	Primitive Baptist Church, Suttles Street, next to Florence Cemetery, Florence
Early Commercial Building‡	More images	9085	203 E. Main St. 30°30′31″N 97°40′39″W	Round Rock	1970	203 E. Main Street, Round Rock (Nelson Hardware Building)
Easley Home†‡		14218	1310 Olive St. 30°37′55″N 97°40′2″W	Georgetown	1984	
Eikel-Prewitt Building‡		9086	316 N. Main St. 30°34′13″N 97°24′34″W	Taylor	1985	316 N. Main Street, Taylor
El Milagro	More images	14634	900 Heritage Center Cir. 30°30′59″N 97°40′33″W	Round Rock	1963	Heritage Center Circle, S of US 79 and E of Mays St. Also known as the Washington Anderson House.
Farmers State Bank Building‡		13603	716 S. Austin Ave. 30°38′13″N 97°40′42″W	Georgetown	2006	716 Austin Ave
First Christian Church of Taylor		9091	603 Talbot St. 30°34′22″N 97°24′41″W	Taylor	1970	6th & Talbot streets, Taylor
First Presbyterian Church		14860	703 S. Church St. 30°38′14″N 97°40′33″W	Georgetown	1962	
First Presbyterian Church of Bartlett		9088	346 W. Pietzsch St. 30°47′44″N 97°25′57″W	Bartlett	1970	346 Pietzsch Street, Bartlett
First United Methodist Church of Georgetown†		9090	410 E. University Ave. 30°37′58″N 97°40′23″W	Georgetown	1974	University Ave. and Ash St.
George Irvine House†		9111	409 E. University Ave. 30°38′0″N 97°40′24″W	Georgetown	1988	409 E. University, Georgetown
Georgetown Fire House and Old City Hall‡		13918	816 S. Main St. 30°38′9″N 97°40′38″W	Georgetown	1984	9th and Main
Georgetown High School Building†		9098	507 E. University Ave. 30°38′1″N 97°40′20″W	Georgetown	1988	507 E. University Ave., Georgetown
Granger City Hall (Farmers State Bank)		9100	212 E. Davilla St. 30°43′2″N 97°26′27″W	Granger	1994	212 E. Davilla Street, Granger
Granger High School		9101	300 N. Colorado St. 30°43′14″N 97°26′13″W	Granger	1991	N. Colorado Street, Granger
H.C. Craig Building‡		13874	115 W. Seventh St. 30°38′16″N 97°40′40″W	Georgetown	1990	
Hall Ranch Home		14171	S of W. SH 29 beyond high school 30°40′42″N 97°57′41″W	Liberty Hill	1962	W. of Liberty Hill on US 29, 808 Ranch
Heinatz Homestead		9104	301 N. Bagdad Rd. 30°34′30″N 97°52′18″W	Leander	1972	1 mi. W of Leander on FM 2243, 0.2 mi. S on Bagdad road
Home of A. J. Nelson		9305	N. A.W. Grimes Blvd. SE of University Blvd. 30°34′7″N 97°38′45″W	Round Rock	1965	FM 1460, SE of Chandler Road (University)
J. A. McDougle Home‡		9297	1312 Elm St. 30°37′55″N 97°40′28″W	Georgetown	1975	1312 Elm Street, Georgetown
Jesse Cooper House†	More images	9042	Wilbarger Point, off SH 29, 1.5 mi. E 30°38′32″N 97°38′48″W	Georgetown	1988	Wilbarger Point, north of SH 29, just west of NE Inner Loop
John G. Matthews House		9296	N of CR 263 E of Metrorail tracks 30°38′28″N 97°52′51″W	Liberty Hill	1976	on private road 1 mile west of US 183, 3.5 miles southeast of Liberty Hill
Lesesne-Stone Building‡		13916	102 W. Eighth St. 30°38′11″N 97°40′38″W	Georgetown	1983	
Liberty Hill Masonic Hall	More images	9291	927 Main St. 30°39′50″N 97°55′20″W	Liberty Hill	1976	Main Street, Liberty Hill
Liberty Hill United Methodist Church		9292	101 Church St. 30°39′53″N 97°55′8″W	Liberty Hill	1962	1 block N of Main Street (Loop 332), Liberty Hill
M.B. Lockett Building‡	More images	13873	119 W. Seventh St. 30°38′16″N 97°40′40″W	Georgetown	1991	
M.B. Norman House		16563	12500 FM 1660 30°30′0″N 97°30′13″W	Taylor	2010	Norman's Crossing
Marsh F. Smith House‡		9340	1242 S. Austin Ave. 30°37′53″N 97°40′42″W	Georgetown	1988	1242 Austin Ave., Georgetown
Nelson-Crier House		9308	405 E. Main St. 30°30′33″N 97°40′30″W	Round Rock	1973	405 E Main St
Old Broom Factory Building‡		9035	100 E. Main St. 30°30′32″N 97°40′43″W	Round Rock	1970	corner of Mays & Main Streets, Round Rock
Old Dimmitt Building‡		13920	801 S. Main St. 30°38′11″N 97°40′36″W	Georgetown	1965	
Old Dimmitt Home†		13921	921 W. University Ave. 30°38′5″N 97°41′12″W	Georgetown	1967	921 W. University (SH 29)
Olson House		12913	808 E. Main St. 30°30′40″N 97°40′15″W	Round Rock	2000	808 E. Main St.
Page-Decrow-Weir House†		9370	1903 J.M. Page Ln. 30°37′24″N 97°41′30″W	Georgetown	1988	N of FM 2243 (Leander Road) on W side of IH-35, Georgetown
Palm Valley Lutheran Church		9317	2500 E. Palm Valley Blvd. 30°31′20″N 97°38′44″W	Round Rock	1970	2500 Palm Valley Blvd
Pickle-Mason House		9321	11332 Hero Way W. 30°34′50″N 97°51′40″W	Leander	1988	FM 2243, 0.4 mi. W of US 183
Pioneers' House		9323	N of San Gabriel Pkwy. E of 183A 30°35′53″N 97°51′7″W	Leander	1970	(Bryson Home)
Preslar-Hewitt Building†‡		13070	321 N. Main St. 30°34′13″N 97°24′35″W	Taylor	2004	321 N. Main Street
Shafer Saddlery‡		13882	711 S. Main St. 30°38′13″N 97°40′36″W	Georgetown	1971	
Shiloh Baptist Church		9337	100 CR 481 30°29′30″N 97°12′13″W	Taylor vicinity	1968	On building on FM 112/CR 15, 15 miles southeast of Taylor
Sloan House		15507	13574 SH 29 30°38′10″N 97°28′29″W	Taylor	1965	Hwy 29, 8 mi. NW of Taylor
Smart-McCormick Home		13803	1251 CR 208 30°48′19″N 97°55′13″W	Andice	1965	4.5 mi. NW of Andice
Southwestern University Administration Building†	More images	9342	1001 E. University Ave. 30°38′0″N 97°40′1″W	Georgetown	1962	1000 E. University Ave. (SH 29), Georgetown
St. James Church		9334	612 Davis St. 30°34′23″N 97°24′53″W	Taylor	1969	corner of Davis and W 7th St
St. Peters United Church of Christ	More images	9335	108 Wathen St. 30°27′29″N 97°23′28″W	Coupland	1989	Wathen and Broad Streets
Steele Store-Makemson Hotel Building‡		13881	802 S. Austin Ave. 30°38′11″N 97°40′42″W	Georgetown	1988	8th and Austin Ave
Stubblefield Building	More images	12998	1002 Main St. 30°39′52″N 97°55′20″W	Liberty Hill	1976	Main St. at Myrtle
Taylor National Bank†‡		9354	200 N. Main St. 30°34′7″N 97°24′33″W	Taylor	1980	
Taylor Post Office‡		9359	202 W. Fourth St. 30°34′15″N 97°24′40″W	Taylor	1992	202 W. Fourth Street, Taylor
The David Love Store‡		13674	706 S. Austin Ave. 30°38′14″N 97°40′42″W	Georgetown	1988	706 Austin Ave
The G. W. Riley House†		9328	1302 S. College St. 30°37′55″N 97°40′19″W	Georgetown	1972	1302 College St
The Harrell-Stone House‡		9103	1404 Elm St. 30°37′53″N 97°40′28″W	Georgetown	1976	1404 Elm Street, Georgetown
Tucker-Smith House		9366	516 W. Seventh St. 30°34′24″N 97°24′58″W	Taylor	1991	516 W. 7th Street, Taylor
United Methodist Church		15212	201 S. Granger St. 30°42′59″N 97°26′30″W	Granger	1970	
W.C. Vaden House†		13897	711 E. University Ave. 30°38′1″N 97°40′13″W	Georgetown	1992	
W. Y. Penn Home‡		9318	1304 Elm St. 30°37′56″N 97°40′28″W	Georgetown	1975	1304 Elm St
Washington Bower		9367	CR 479 W of CR 492 30°29′57″N 97°13′54″W	Taylor	1971	15 mi. SE of Taylor on FM 112 to CR 479
Wesley Chapel A.M.E. Church†		13895	508 W. Fourth St. 30°38′24″N 97°40′53″W	Georgetown	1984	
Wessels, T. F., Home		14169	1002 N. Mays St. 30°30′59″N 97°41′2″W	Round Rock	1963	on campus of First United Methodist Church
William M. Owen House Complex†	More images	9315	900 Chisholm Trail Rd. 30°30′55″N 97°41′24″W	Round Rock	1982	900 Chisholm Trail Rd
Williamson County Courthouse‡#	More images	13880	710 S. Main St. 30°38′13″N 97°40′39″W	Georgetown	1988	Williamson County Courthouse grounds
Williamson County Jail‡		14481	312 S. Main St. 30°38′25″N 97°40′39″W	Georgetown	1965	
Young House		9372	500 E. Davilla St. 30°43′1″N 97°26′17″W	Granger	1991	500 E. Davilla, Granger

== Wilson County ==
Registered Texas Historic Landmark	Image	Marker number	Physical address	Nearest city	Year designated	Description
Albert Kosub House		100	1230 Hill Top Ln. 29°24′39″N 98°7′58″W	LaVernia	1963	From 1346 turn left at first gravel road, about 4 miles, take a right, go about 1/2 mile, go left until approach mailboxes, proceed straight up driveway/dirt road to home.
Barker-Huebinger House		14192	13309 FM 539 29°20′35″N 98°3′38″W	Sutherland Springs	2008	
Brahan Lodge #226, A.F. & A.M.	More images	487	121 Bluebonnet Dr. 29°21′14″N 98°7′7″W	LaVernia	1962	FM 775, southwest of US 87
Bridge at McAlister Crossing (Mueller Bridge) (2/10 mi. SW)†	More images	13258	FM 539, CR 337 29°21′5″N 98°4′28″W	LaVernia	2004	SE of town at intersection of FM 539 and CR 337. Marker reported missing Mar. 2008.
Cemetery of Canary Islanders		701	700 Tenth St. 29°8′56″N 98°9′31″W	Floresville	1967	Marker is at NE corner of 10th and Plum Streets, facing 10th Street (US 181). Cemetery is behind O'Reilly Auto Parts and AutoZone.
Charles Carl Winkler House		812	0.25 mi. from Bexar County line S of FM 1346 29°22′36″N 98°11′0″W	LaVernia	1963	Take 1346 north out of La Vernia to the Carpenter Community located at Wilson/Bexar County Line. House is on left 1/4 mile from County Line. Located behind new Winkler family about 300 feet off highway.
King-Lorenz House		2953	303 S. Seventh St. 29°14′0″N 97°57′42″W	Stockdale	1984	Located on 7th Street, 3 blocks south of Main Street, Stockdale.
White House Café and Saloon		12828	1307 Third St. 29°8′3″N 98°9′33″W	Floresville	2002	1307 3rd St.
Whitehall†	More images	13807	FM 539 29°19′2″N 98°3′28″W	Sutherland Springs	1962	three miles north of Sutherland Springs on FM 539 (Polley Mansion)
Wilson County Courthouse†#	More images	5856	1420 Third St. 29°8′0″N 98°9′27″W	Floresville	1984	1420 Third Street, Floresville.
Yndo Ranch	More images	4159	FM 1303 E of FM 775 29°11′40″N 98°16′23″W	Floresville	1964	From Floresville, 3 mi. W on FM 536, then 7 mi. NW on FM 1303, near intersection with FM 775

== Winkler County ==
Registered Texas Historic Landmark	Image	Marker number	Physical address	Nearest city	Year designated	Description
Kermit's Oldest Home		2928	2100 Tommy Thompson Rd. 31°51′24″N 103°4′45″W	Kermit	1964	Pioneer Park, Tommy Thompson Rd., Kermit (Mosley House)
Texas Territorial Compromise of 1850		5274	SH 18 at New Mexico state line N of Kermit 31°59′58″N 103°7′58″W	Kermit	1966	From Kermit, take SH 18 North then at State Line.
The Community Church		1005	302 S. Poplar St. 31°51′20″N 103°5′34″W	Kermit	1966	302 South Poplar St., Kermit
The Sand Hills		4561	SH 115 beyond FM 874 NE of Kermit 31°57′43″N 102°57′55″W	Kermit	1967	From Kermit, take SH 115 NE about 8 mile Junction N of FM 874.
Wink Junior High and High School		17754	200 N. Rosey Dodd Ave. 31°45′18″N 103°9′8″W	Wink	2012	Wink's lone historical marker is soon to be recalled due to pending demolition of the historic structure passed by superintendent Scotty Carman and the WLISD school board.
Winkler County Courthouse		5867	110 E. Winkler St. 31°51′26″N 103°5′37″W	Kermit	1988	110 E. Winkler St., Kermit

== Wise County ==
Registered Texas Historic Landmark	Image	Marker number	Physical address	Nearest city	Year designated	Description
Decatur Baptist College†	More images	1197	1602 S. Trinity St. 33°13′22″N 97°35′11″W	Decatur	1964	At south end of Trinity Street, Decatur
El Castile (Old Waggoner Home)†	More images	4	1003 E. Main St. 33°14′3″N 97°34′37″W	Decatur	1962	1000 E. Main St., Decatur
Episcopal Mission of the Ascension	More images	1492	905 S. Church St. 33°13′42″N 97°35′7″W	Decatur	1968	S. Church & Hale Streets, Decatur
Greenwood Masonic Lodge #779		18394	147 CR 2640 33°22′49″N 97°28′27″W	Decatur	2016	147 County Road 2640 {Corner of CR 2640 (old Main Street) and Farm to Market Road 1204} Decatur (Greewood), Texas 76234
Hanna-Robinson-Richey Drugstore	More images	2364	104 Jacksboro St. 33°17′42″N 97°47′52″W	Chico	1976	Jacksboro Street (near Buffalo Street, on public square), Chico
Masonic Lodge #479		3244	128 W. Rock Island Ave. 33°4′42″N 97°33′58″W	Boyd	1965	S. Evans at W. Rock Island, Boyd
Old Stone Prison	More images	3821	201 E. Pecan St. 33°14′0″N 97°35′9″W	Decatur	1968	201 E. Pecan Street
Perrin Log Cabin		17690	Confluence of Center Creek with Martin Branch 33°11′24″N 97°36′8″W	Decatur	2013	
R. C. Mount House		4151	1 mi. N on Mount St. 33°18′47″N 97°47′31″W	Chico	1975	From Chico, take Mount Street 1 mile north.
S. W. Tilghman House	More images	4404	309 E. Shoemaker St. 33°13′58″N 97°35′2″W	Decatur	1974	309 E Shoemaker. Replaced 2007.
Sam Woody's Cabin		4509	5 mi. S of US 81/US 287 on CR 4227 33°7′35″N 97°31′28″W	Decatur	1970	From Decatur, take US 81/87 about 3 miles south to CR 4227; follow 4227 about 5 miles south to marker at cabin.
Texas Tourist Camp Complex†	More images	5275	900-904 S. US 81/US 287 33°13′42″N 97°34′44″W	Decatur	1994	900-904 US 81/87 south -Decatur
Wise County Courthouse†#	More images	5874	101 N. Trinity St. 33°14′3″N 97°35′13″W	Decatur	1964	Northwest entrance of Courthouse, State & Walnut Streets

== Wood County ==
Registered Texas Historic Landmark	Image	Marker number	Physical address	Nearest city	Year designated	Description
Callaway House		16887	512 Sycamore St. 32°40′4″N 95°29′31″W	Mineola	2011	
Carlock Home†		8949	407 S. Main St. 32°57′13″N 95°17′29″W	Winnsboro	1966	407 S. Main St., Winnsboro
Central Christian Church (Disciples of Christ) of Winnsboro		8950	110 Sage St. 32°57′38″N 95°17′27″W	Winnsboro	1980	110 Sage Street, Winnsboro
Collins-Haines Home		8953	Horton St. SE of Nathan Dr. 32°47′10″N 95°26′31″W	Quitman	1965	1/2 mile SE of Quitman on FM 778 (Horton Street)
Corbitt Home		11670	13 mi. SE off FM 2088	Winnsboro	1962	13 mi. SE of Winnsboro, off FM 2088
First National Bank Building‡		12771	101 E. Broad St. 32°39′50″N 95°29′21″W	Mineola	2001	101 E. Broad
James Stephen Hogg's Early Home		8962	518 S. Main St. 32°47′28″N 95°27′12″W	Quitman	1962	In Gov. Jim Hogg City Park
Lankford-Stinson House		8972	307 W. Elm St. 32°57′33″N 95°17′36″W	Winnsboro	1988	307 W. Elm Street, Winnsboro
Lott House†	More images	8976	311 E. Kilpatrick St. 32°39′50″N 95°29′9″W	Mineola	1996	311 E. Kilpatrick Street, Mineola
Mineola Post Office‡	More images	11664	114 N. Pacific St. 32°39′50″N 95°29′15″W	Mineola	1999	114 N. Pacific Street, Mineola
O. P. Pyle House		9019	123 N. Line St. 32°39′54″N 95°29′25″W	Mineola	1982	123 N. Line Street, Mineola
Old Bailey Hotel		8948	111 E. Front St. 32°39′42″N 95°29′21″W	Mineola	1980	111 Front St. BUILDING RAZED 2001, MARKER REMOVED
Reneau Building		17729	703 FM 1799 32°43′48″N 95°33′41″W	Golden	2013	
The Cathey Buildings		17208	100 blk. W. Lipscomb St. at N. Stephens St. 32°47′47″N 95°27′9″W	Quitman	2012	West end of the North side of the public square in Quitman
Williams Medical Clinic Building		17223	415 W. Kilpatrick St. 32°39′54″N 95°29′35″W	Mineola	2012	
Wood County Courthouse		13752	100 S. Main St. 32°47′45″N 95°27′8″W	Quitman	2003	Main Street

== Yoakum County ==
Registered Texas Historic Landmark	Image	Marker number	Physical address	Nearest city	Year designated	Description
Bonus Shack		3325	1109 B Ave. H 33°11′14″N 102°49′37″W	Plains	1962	1109 B Avenue H, Plains

== Young County ==
Registered Texas Historic Landmark	Image	Marker number	Physical address	Nearest city	Year designated	Description
A. B. Medlan Home		48	Lower Tonk Valley Rd. 33°2′18″N 98°36′59″W	Graham	1964	Take SH 67 south about 5 miles then left on county road about 5 mi. (Private, no Access)
Dr. & Mrs. J.W. Gallaher House		16581	616 East St. 33°6′18″N 98°35′5″W	Graham	2010	616 East Street
Early Church of Graham		1339	701 Grove St. 33°6′16″N 98°35′34″W	Graham	1971	701 Grove St., Graham
Episcopal Parish Church		1493	3128 Park Road 36 32°53′17″N 98°27′59″W	Graham	1962	South on Possum Kingdom Lake, Graham; (now the Holy Spirit Church of Graham)
Fort Belknap⁕	More images	1959	3 mi. S of Newcastle W of FM 61 33°9′3″N 98°44′29″W	Newcastle	1962	SH 251, from Newcastle, about 3 mi south
Graham Post Office†		13743	510 Third St. 33°6′20″N 98°35′27″W	Graham	1999	510 Third St.
Lewis Pinkney Brooks Home		3078	Pinkney Brooks Rd. 1 mi. W of SH 209 33°4′19″N 98°43′42″W	Graham	1965	From Graham, take Hwy. 209 west about 8 mi (Loc. near old McCambridge) to Local road (Pinkey Brooks Rd), Follow one mi. to house.
Medlan Chapel Primitive Baptist Church		3317	Medlan Chapel Rd. W of SH 67 33°4′31″N 98°41′41″W	Graham	1965	From Graham, take SH 67 south about 3 mi then follow Canty Road west about 5 mi.
Old Fort Belknap Powder Magazine⁕	More images	3729	N of Fort Cir. W of FM 61 33°9′6″N 98°44′27″W	Newcastle	1962	From Newcastle, take SH 251 south about 3 mi to Ft. Belknap
Ryus Store Building		4398	608 Oak St. 33°6′19″N 98°35′30″W	Graham	1974	608 Oak St., Graham

== Zapata County ==
Registered Texas Historic Landmark	Image	Marker number	Physical address	Nearest city	Year designated	Description
Jesus Trevino Home⁕†‡	More images	5556	Jct. Trevino St. and Uribe St. 27°2′42″N 99°26′36″W	San Ygnacio	1964	At Trevino & Uribe Avenues, San Ygnacio.

== Zavala County ==
Currently, no Recorded Texas Historic Landmarks are listed within the county.

== See also ==
Recorded Texas Historic Landmarks listed by county
Anderson-Callahan • Cameron-Duval • Eastland-Gray • Grayson-Hudspeth • Hunt-Martin • Mason-Rusk • Sabine-Travis • Trinity-Zavala
