= Bust of Henry C. Matysek =

Sculpture in Georgetown, Texas, U.S.

Henry C. Matysek
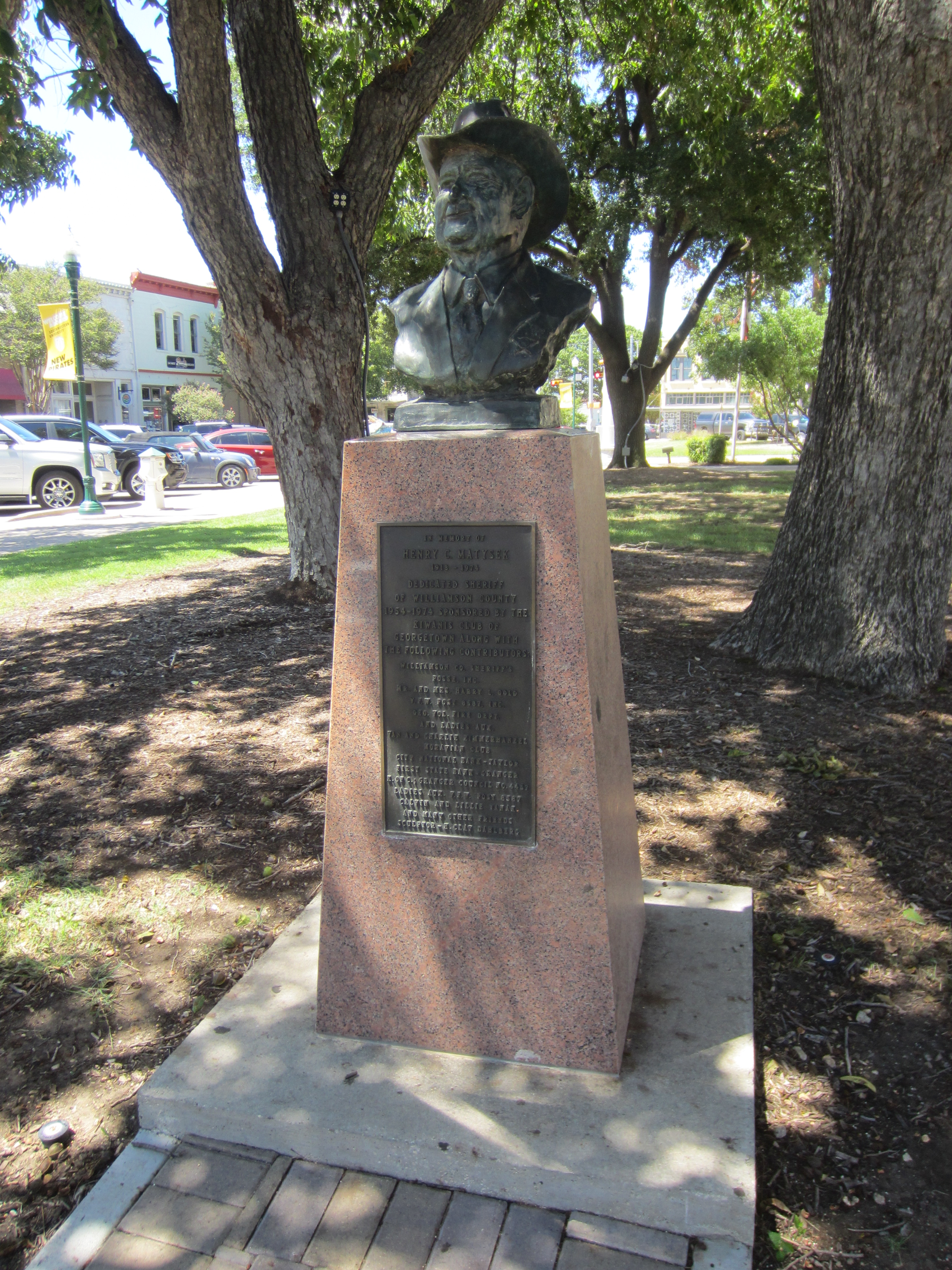
- The bust in 2018
- Artist: H. Clay Dahlberg
- Year: 1975
- Medium: Bronze sculpture
- Subject: Henry C. Matysek
- Location: Georgetown, Texas, United States; 30.636839°N 97.677208°W

Henry C. Matysek is a 1975 bronze sculpture depicting the former Williamson County sheriff of the same name by H. Clay Dahlberg, installed outside the Williamson County Courthouse, in Georgetown, Texas, United States.

== Description ==
The bronze portrait bust depicts Matysek, a former Williamson County sheriff, wearing a cowboy hat, suit and tie, and a badge shaped like a star on his chest. The sculpture measures approximately 24 x 18 x 13 inches, and rests on a pink granite base that measures approximately 48 x 25 x 25 inches. A plaque on the base reads "IN MEMORY OF / HENRY C. MATYSEK / 1918–1974 / DEDICATED SHERIFF / OF WILLIAMSON COUNTY / 1954–1974 / SPONSORED BY THE / KIWANIS CLUB OF / GEORGETOWN ALONG WITH / THE FOLLOWING CONTRIBUTORS", followed by a list of names.

== History ==
The bust was sponsored by the city's Kiwanis club. It was surveyed by the Smithsonian Institution's "Save Outdoor Sculpture!" program in 1995.

== See also ==
- 1975 in art
