= Williamson Museum =

Local museum in Georgetown, Texas, United States

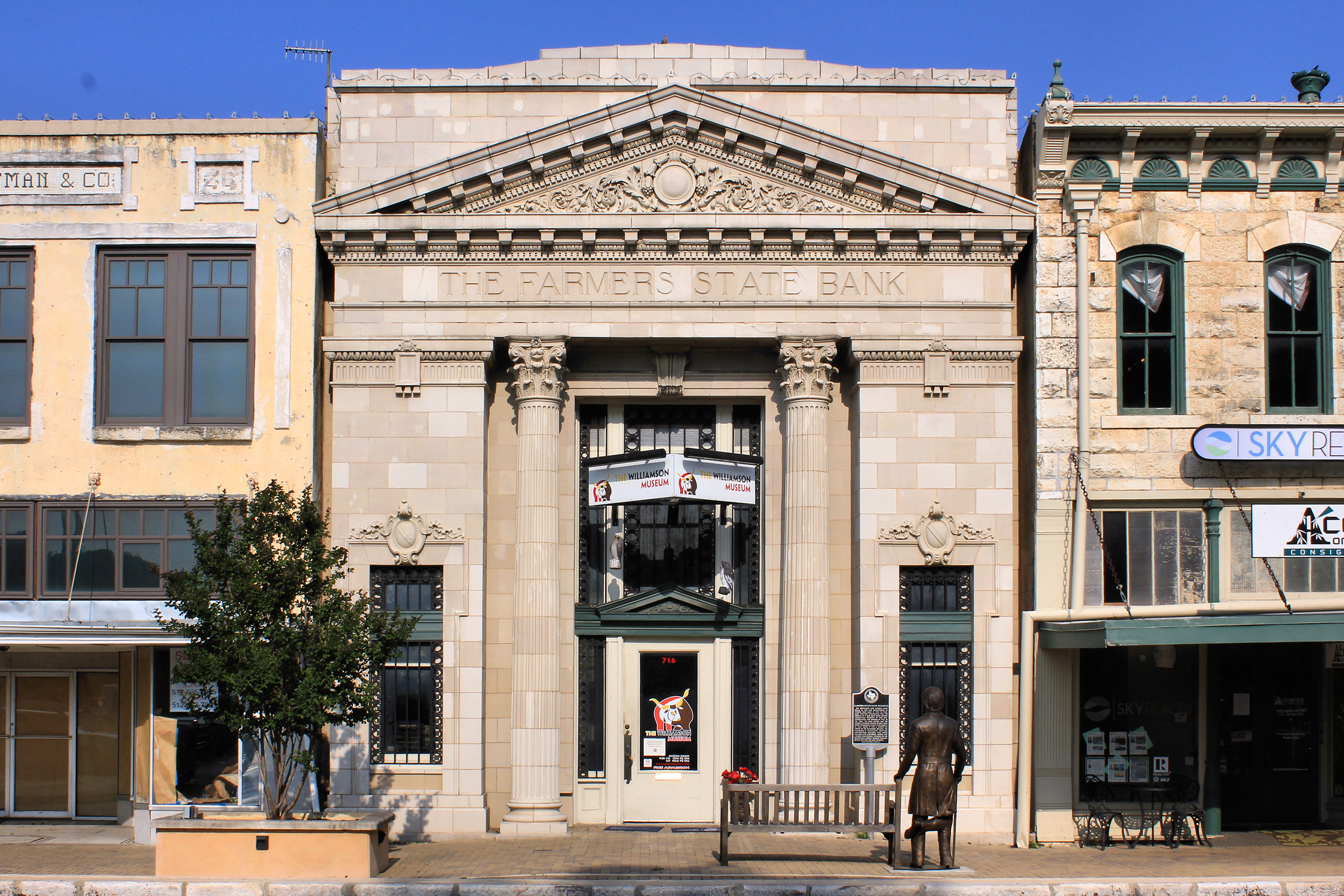
- Established: 1997
- Location: Georgetown, Texas
- Coordinates: 30.63682°N 97.67827°W
- Type: local museum
- Executive director: Danelle Houck
- Curator: Ben Geiger
- Website: williamsonmuseum.org

The Williamson Museum is a local museum established in 1997 focused on the culture and heritage of Williamson County, Texas. The museum is located at 716 S. Austin Ave on the historic square in Georgetown, Texas, in the former Farmers State Bank building. The museum organization is incorporated as a 501(c)(3) non-profit corporation.

== See also ==
- Statue of Robert McAlpin Williamson
