= C.S. Belford =

Builder in Texas

Charles S. Belford, most commonly known as C.S. Belford, and his firm Belford Lumber Co. were prolific local builders in Georgetown, Texas. They built a number of buildings that survive and are listed on the U.S. National Register of Historic Places.

== Works ==
- Martin C. Amos House, 1408 Olive, Georgetown, TX, NRHP-listed with credit as Belford Lumber Co.
- Atkinson House, 911 Walnut, Georgetown, TX, NRHP-listed with credit as Belford Lumber Co.
- Belford's house, and other buildings, in the Belford Historic District, roughly bounded by University Ave., Main, E. Eighteenth, and Austin, Georgetown, TX, NRHP-listed with credit as Belford, Charles S.
- Jesse and Sara Cooper House, 1.8 mi. E of Georgetown Hwy. 29, Georgetown, TX, NRHP-listed with credit as Belford Lumber Co.
- E. M. Daughtrey House, 1316 E. University, Georgetown, TX, NRHP-listed with credit as Belford Lumber Co.
- S. A. Easley House, 1310 Olive, Georgetown, TX, NRHP-listed with credit as Belford Lumber Co.
- D. D. Fowler House, 1531 Ash, Georgetown, TX, NRHP-listed with credit as Belford Lumber Co.
- Will and Mary Leake House, 313 E. Seventh, Georgetown, TX, NRHP-listed with credit as Belford Lumber Co.
- Miller-Ellyson House, 303 E. Ninth, Georgetown, TX, NRHP-listed with credit as Belford Lumber Co.
- Paige-DeCrow-Weir House, I-35 and SR 2243, Georgetown, TX, NRHP-listed with credit as Belford, C.S.
- Pegues House, 904 E. University, Georgetown, TX, NRHP-listed with credit as Belford Lumber Co.
- A. W. Sillure House, 1414 Ash, Georgetown, TX, NRHP-listed with credit as Belford Lumber Co.
- Robert and Lula Stone House, 1102 Ash, Georgetown, TX, NRHP-listed with credit as Belford Lumber Co.
- Taylor-Cooper House, 105 E. Fifth, Georgetown, TX, NRHP-listed with credit as Belford Lumber Co.
- W. C. and Kate Vaden House, 711 E. University, Georgetown, TX, NRHP-listed with credit as Belford Lumber Co.
- D. K. and Inez Wilcox House, 1307 Olive, Georgetown, TX, NRHP-listed with credit as Belford Lumber Co.
