= Farmers State Bank (Georgetown, Texas) =

Historic building in Georgetown, Texas, U.S.

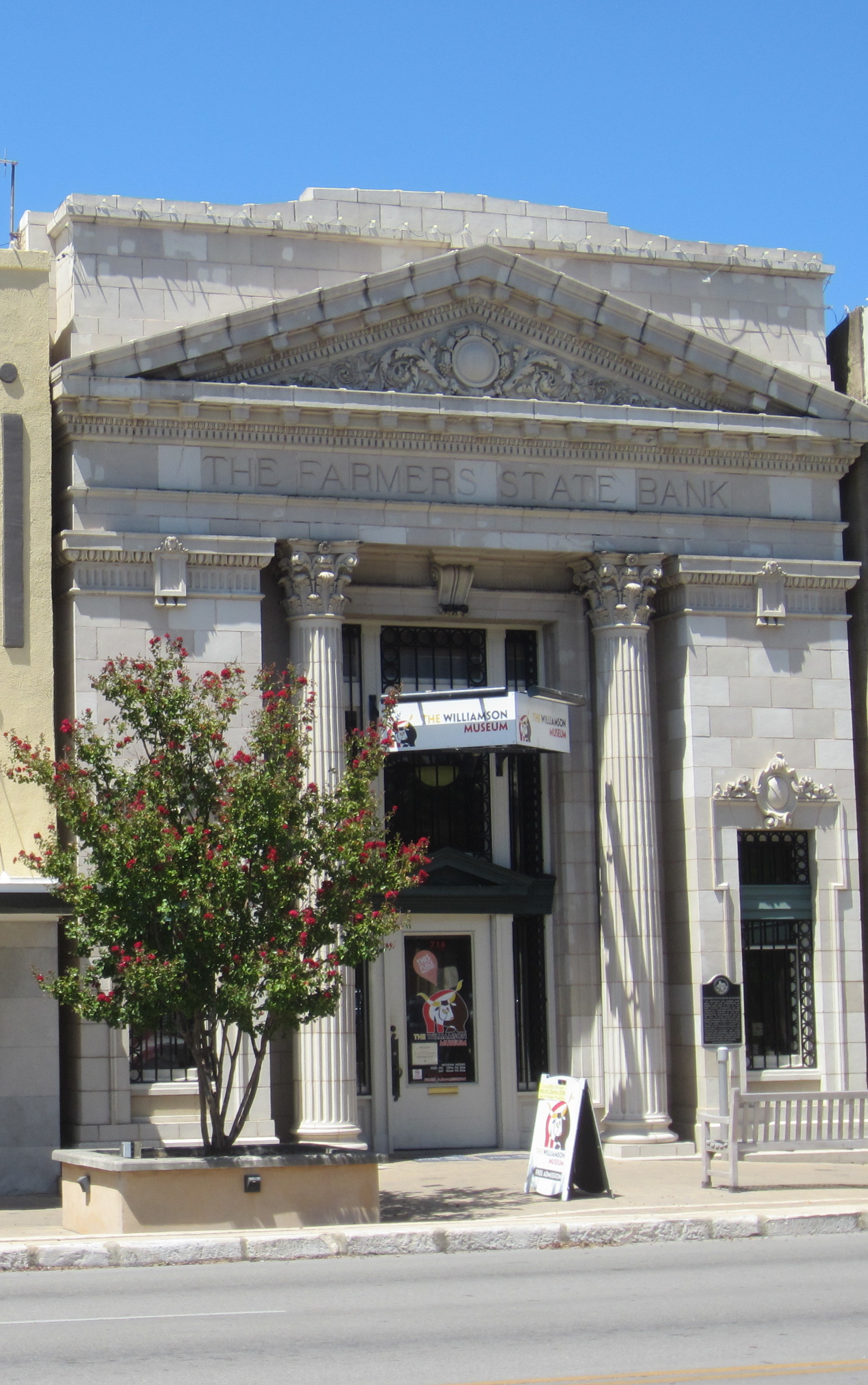
- The building's exterior in 2018
- Interactive map of the Farmers State Bank area

General information
- Location: 716 South Austin Avenue, Georgetown, Texas, United States
- Coordinates: 30°38′12.6″N 97°40′42″W
- Current tenants: Williamson Museum

Technical details
- Material: Limestone

Design and construction
- Designations: Texas Historical Marker

Farmers State Bank is an historic limestone building located at 716 South Austin Avenue in Georgetown, Texas, United States. Once housing a Farmers State Bank, the building received Texas Historical Marker status in 2006, and currently houses the Williamson Museum. It is part of the Williamson County Courthouse Historic District.

== See also ==
- List of Recorded Texas Historic Landmarks (Trinity-Zavala)
- Williamson County Courthouse Historic District
