= Wood–Hughes House =

Historic house in Texas, United States

- U.S. National Register of Historic Places
- Recorded Texas Historic Landmark
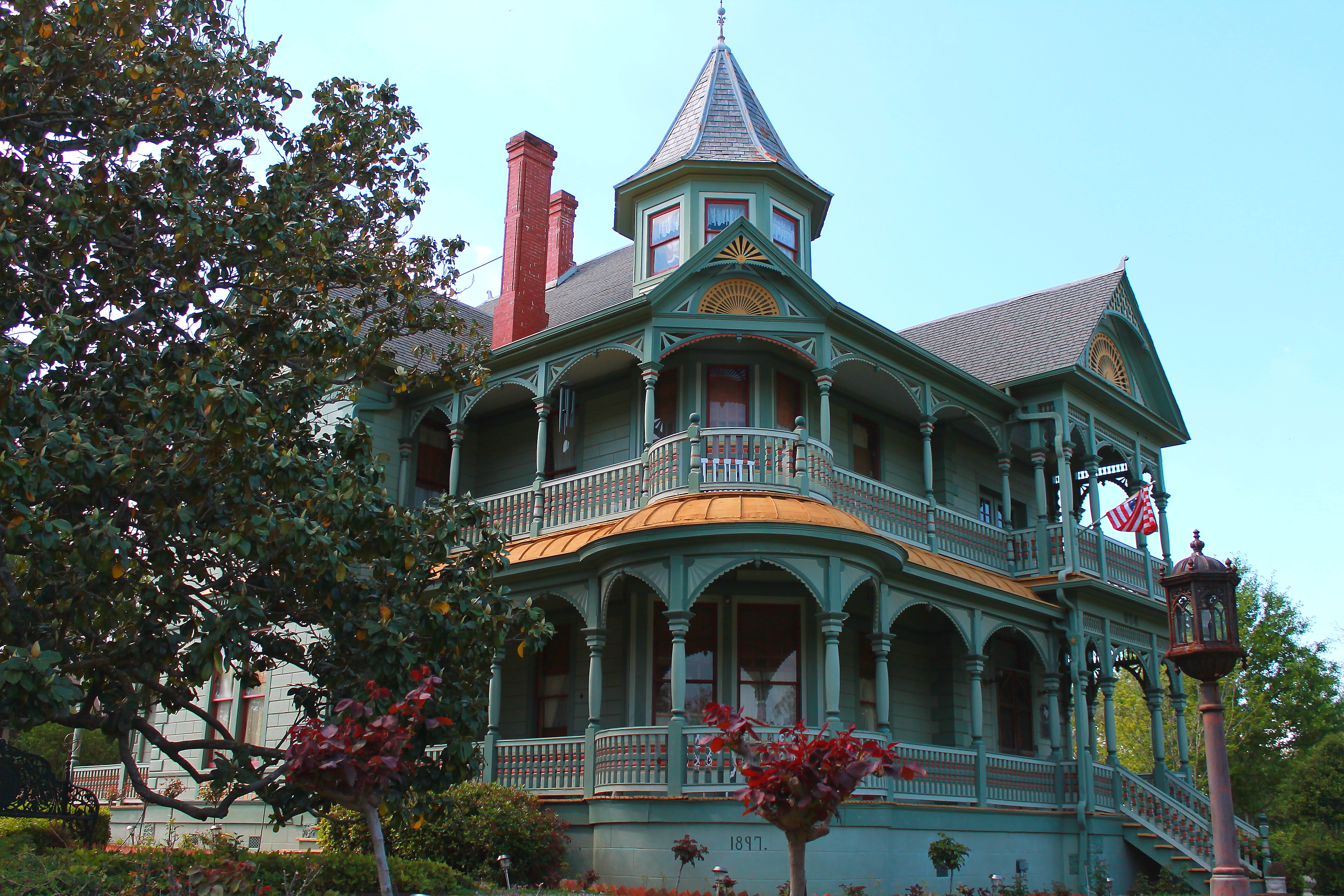
- Wood–Hughes House in 2012

- Location within Texas Location within the United States
- Location: 614 S. Austin, Brenham, Texas
- Coordinates: 30°9′43″N 96°23′56″W
- Area: less than one acre
- Built: 1897
- Architectural style: Stick/Eastlake
- MPS: Brenham MPS
- NRHP reference No.: 90000448
- RTHL No.: 8408

Significant dates
- Added to NRHP: March 29, 1990
- Designated RTHL: 1974

The Wood–Hughes House is a historical house located at 614 S. Austin in Brenham, Texas. Built in 1897, the house is an example of Late Victorian architecture. Owners W. A. and Fannie Wood built the house using high-quality lumber and siding that resembled stone. The house was purchased by planter and rancher Henry W. Hughes in 1913. The house resembles the F. W. Schuerenberg House, which is also in Brenham.

The house was added to the National Register of Historic Places on March 29, 1990.

== See also ==
- National Register of Historic Places listings in Washington County, Texas
- Recorded Texas Historic Landmarks in Washington County
