= Williamson County Jail (Texas) =

Historic building in Georgetown, Texas, U.S.

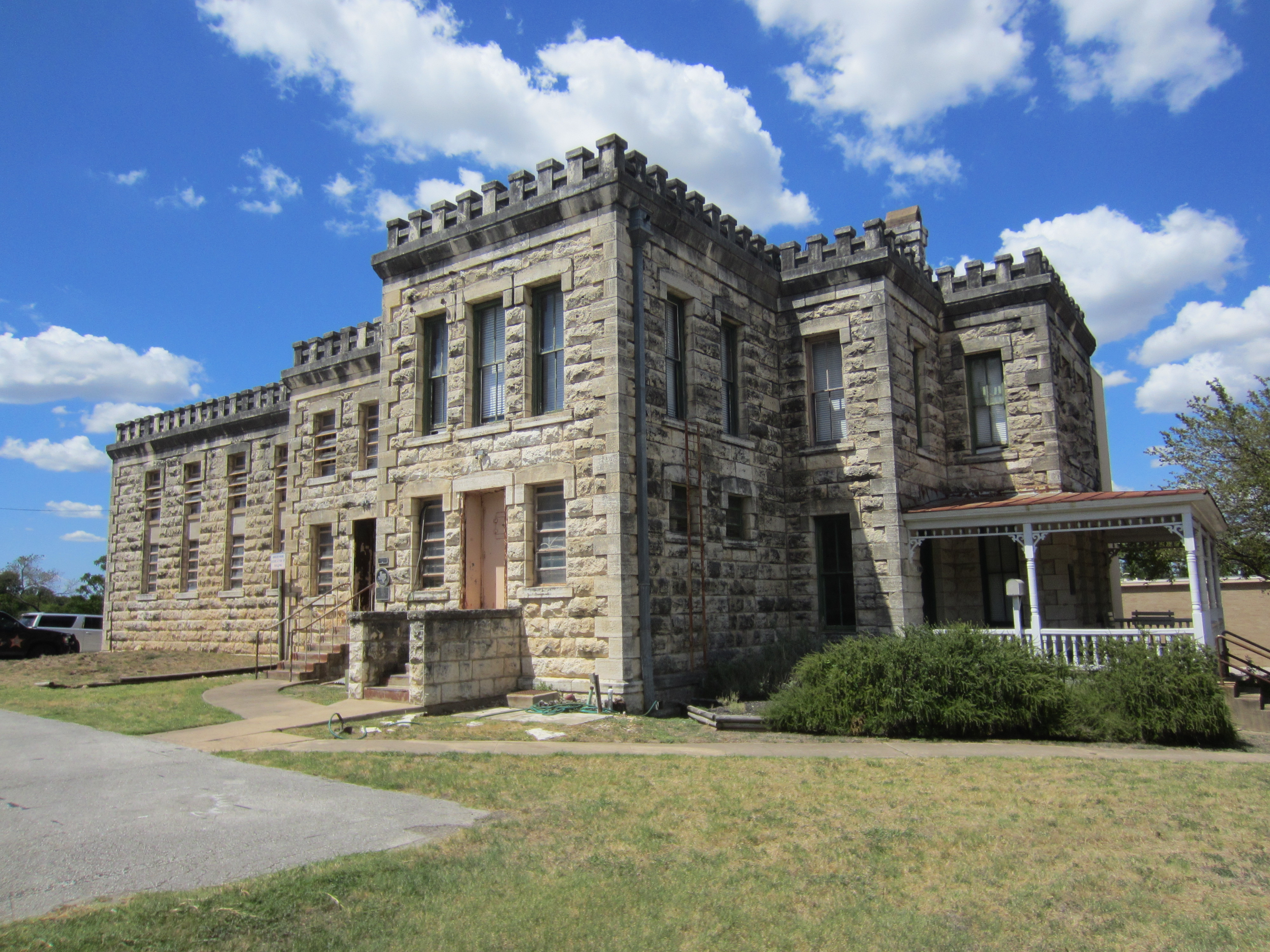
- The building's exterior in 2018
- Interactive map of the Williamson County Jail area

General information
- Location: Georgetown, Texas, United States
- Coordinates: 30°38′25″N 97°40′39″W

Design and construction
- Architecture firm: Dodson & Dudley
- Main contractor: Lovell & Miller

The Williamson County Jail, or Old Williamson County Jail, is a historic building in Georgetown, Texas, United States. It is part of the Williamson County Courthouse Historic District, and has been designated a Recorded Texas Historic Landmark.

== See also ==
- List of Recorded Texas Historic Landmarks (Trinity-Zavala)
