= Statue of Robert McAlpin Williamson =

Sculpture in Georgetown, Texas, U.S.

Statue of Robert Williamson
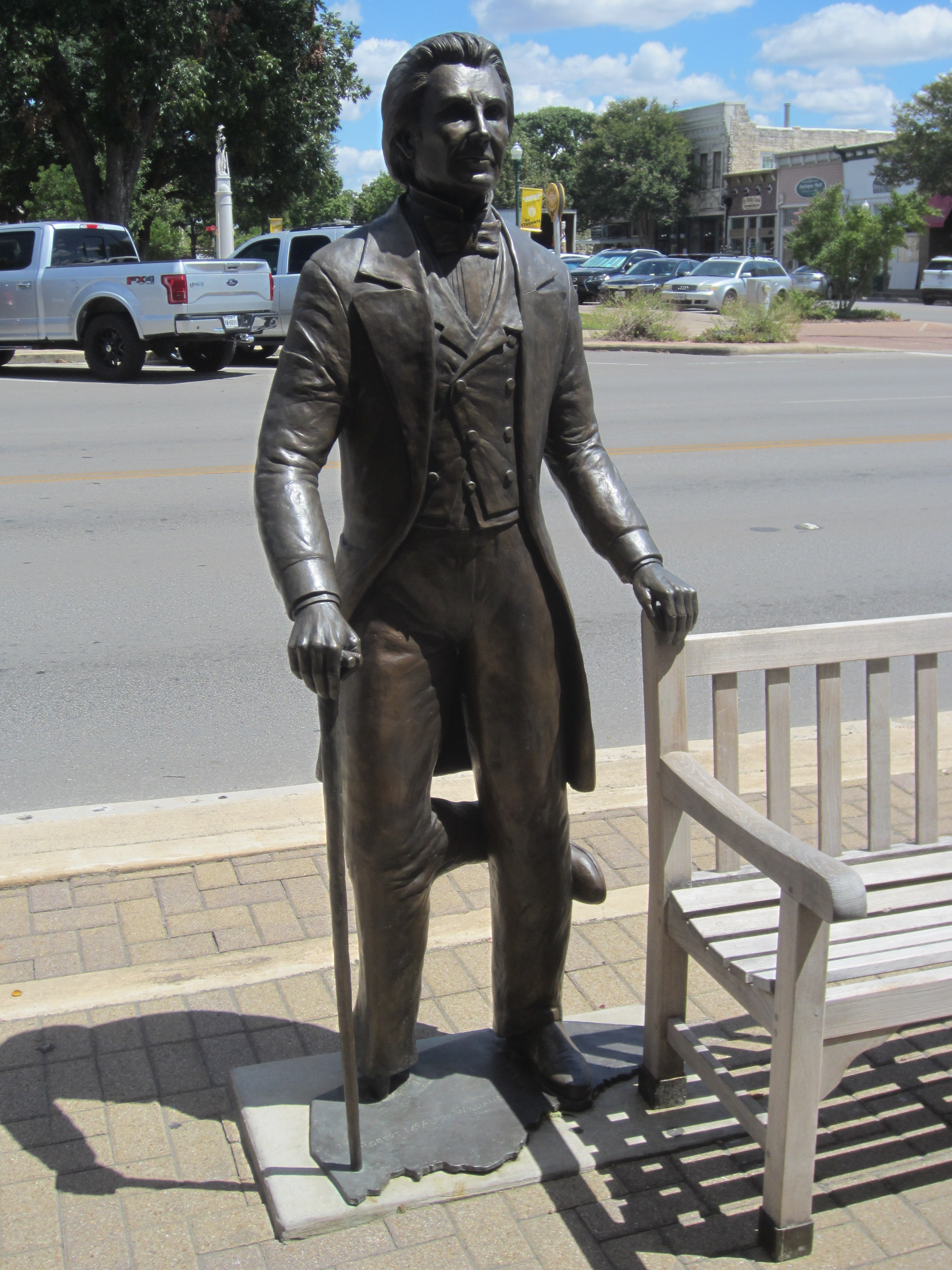
- The statue in 2018
- Artist: Lucas Adams
- Subject: Robert McAlpin Williamson
- Location: Georgetown, Texas, United States; 30.636833°N 97.678147°W

A bronze sculpture depicting Robert McAlpin Williamson by Lucas Adams is installed outside the Williamson Museum in Georgetown, Texas, United States. The statue was erected in December 2013, and cost $40,000. The museum raised approximately half the funds.

== See also ==
- 2013 in art
