= M.B. Lockett Building =

Historic building in Georgetown, Texas, U.S.

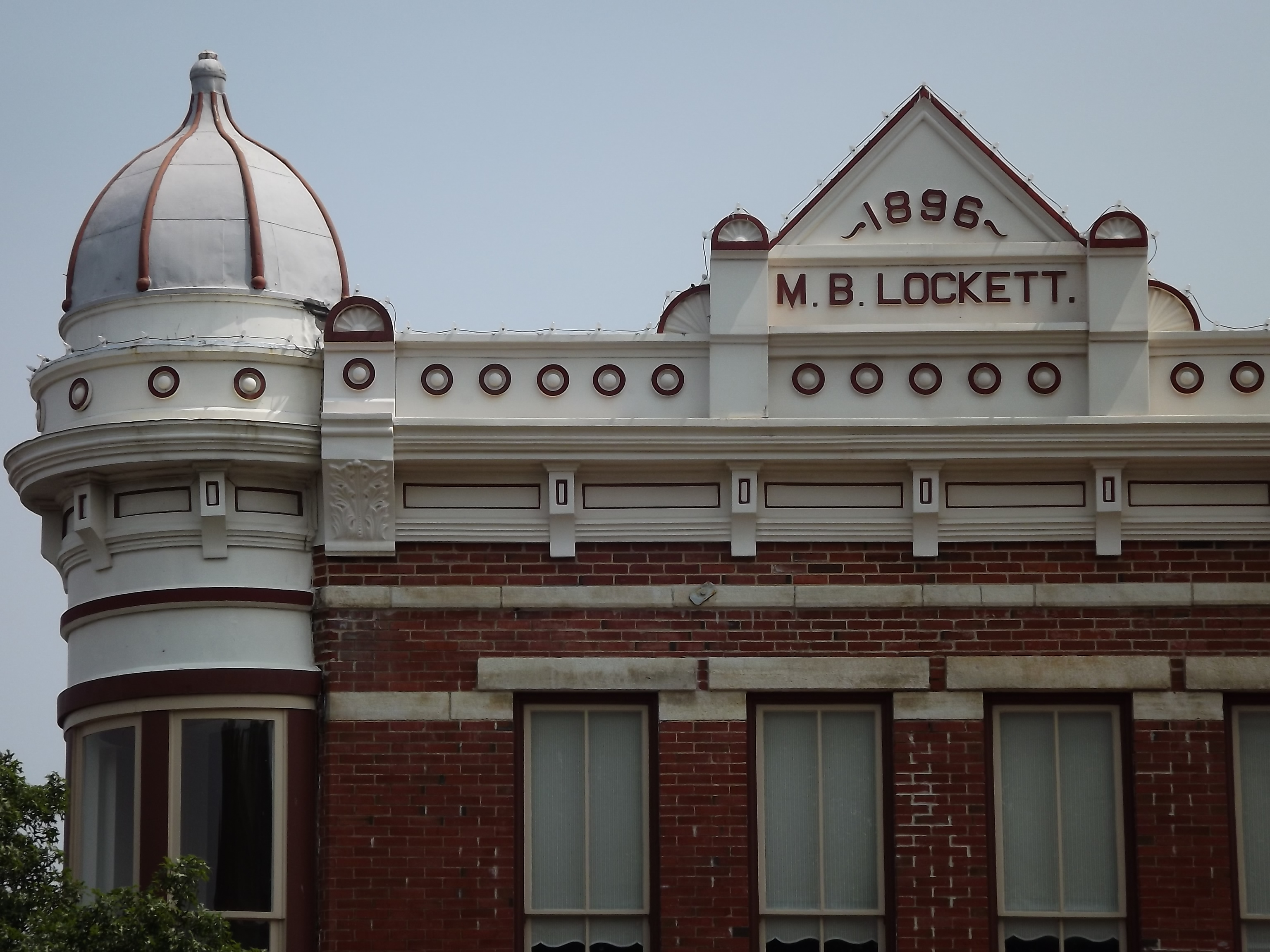
- The building's exterior, 2012

- Location within Texas

General information
- Location: Georgetown, Texas, United States
- Coordinates: 30.63769°N 97.67787°W

The M.B. Lockett Building is an historic building at 119 West 7th Street in Georgetown, Texas, United States. It is part of the Williamson County Courthouse Historic District.

== See also ==
- List of Recorded Texas Historic Landmarks (Trinity-Zavala)
