= Palace Theatre (Georgetown, Texas) =

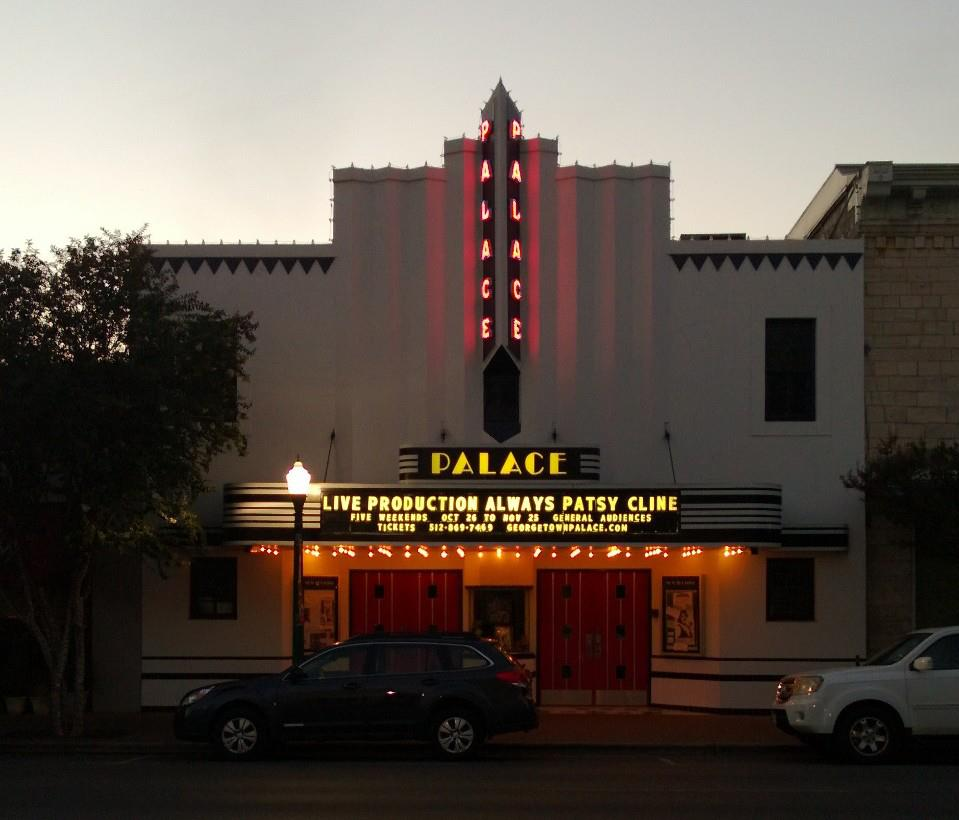
- The theatre in 2012

- Location in Texas
- Location: Georgetown, Texas
- Coordinates: 30.63617°N 97.67827°W

The Palace Theatre is an historic theatre in Georgetown, Texas, United States. It is part of the Williamson County Courthouse Historic District.

The theatre was ranked the best live entertainment venue in the Austin American-Statesman's 2017 "Best of Georgetown" list.
