= Georgetown Fire House and Old City Hall =

Historic building in Georgetown, Texas, U.S.

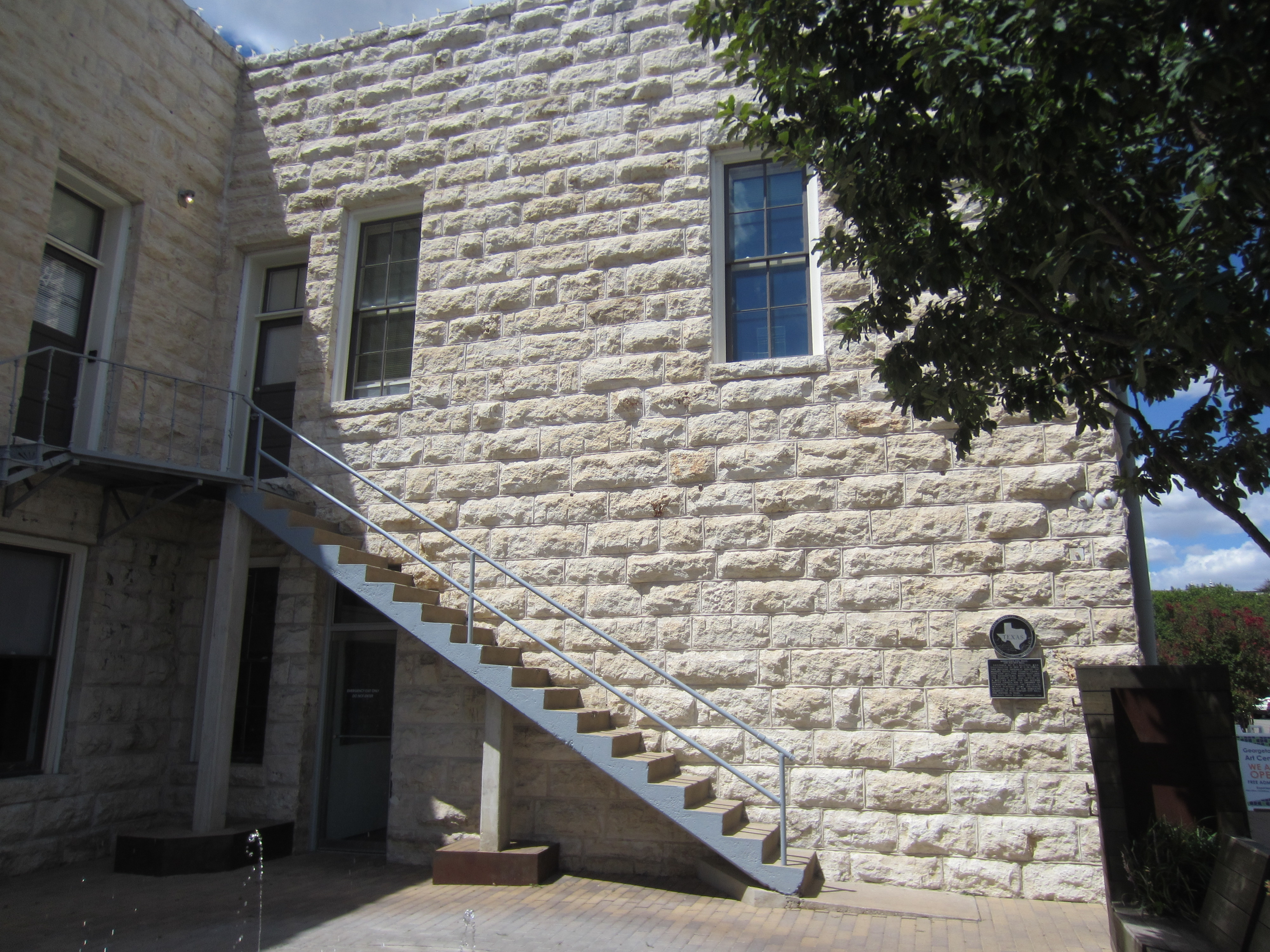
- Part of the building's exterior, 2018
- Interactive map of the Georgetown Fire House and Old City Hall area

General information
- Location: Georgetown, Texas, United States
- Coordinates: 30.6359°N 97.6773°W

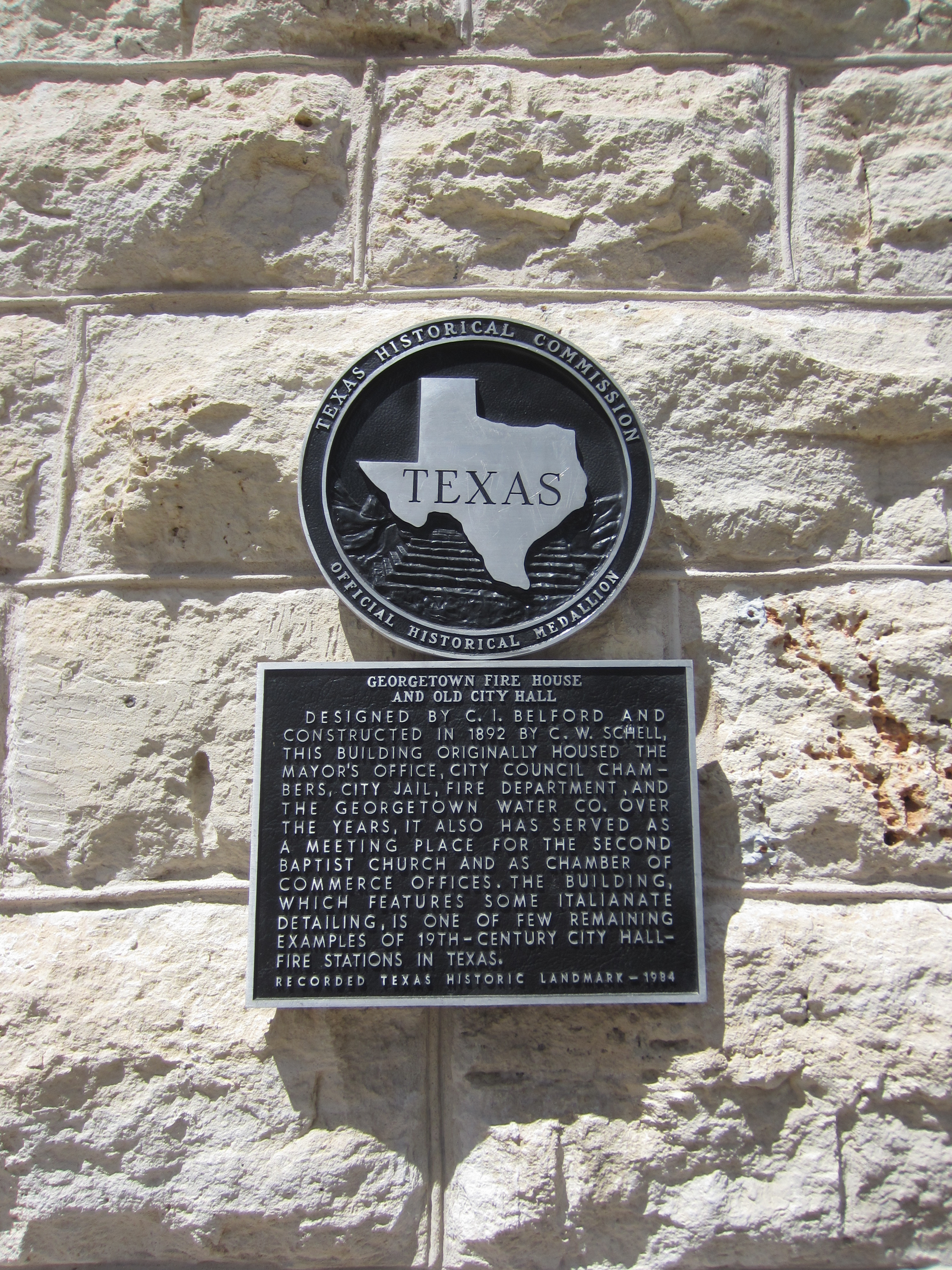
Plaque, 2018

The Georgetown Fire House and Old City Hall is a limestone building located at the intersection of 9th Street and South Main Street in Georgetown, Texas, United States.

== Description and history ==
The structure was designed by C.I. Belford and built by C.W. Schell in 1892. It originally housed the fire department, city council chambers and mayor's office, a jail, and the local water company. Since then, the Fire House and Old City Hall has housed chamber of commerce offices and been used by Second Baptist Church. According to the Williamson County Historical Commission, the structure is a rare example of hybrid fire station and city hall buildings constructed during the 19th century. It was designated a Recorded Texas Historic Landmark in 1984, and is part of the Williamson County Courthouse Historic District.

== See also ==
- List of Recorded Texas Historic Landmarks (Trinity-Zavala)
