= Williamson County Courthouse Historic District =

Historic district in Georgetown, Texas, U.S.

- U.S. National Register of Historic Places
- U.S. Historic district
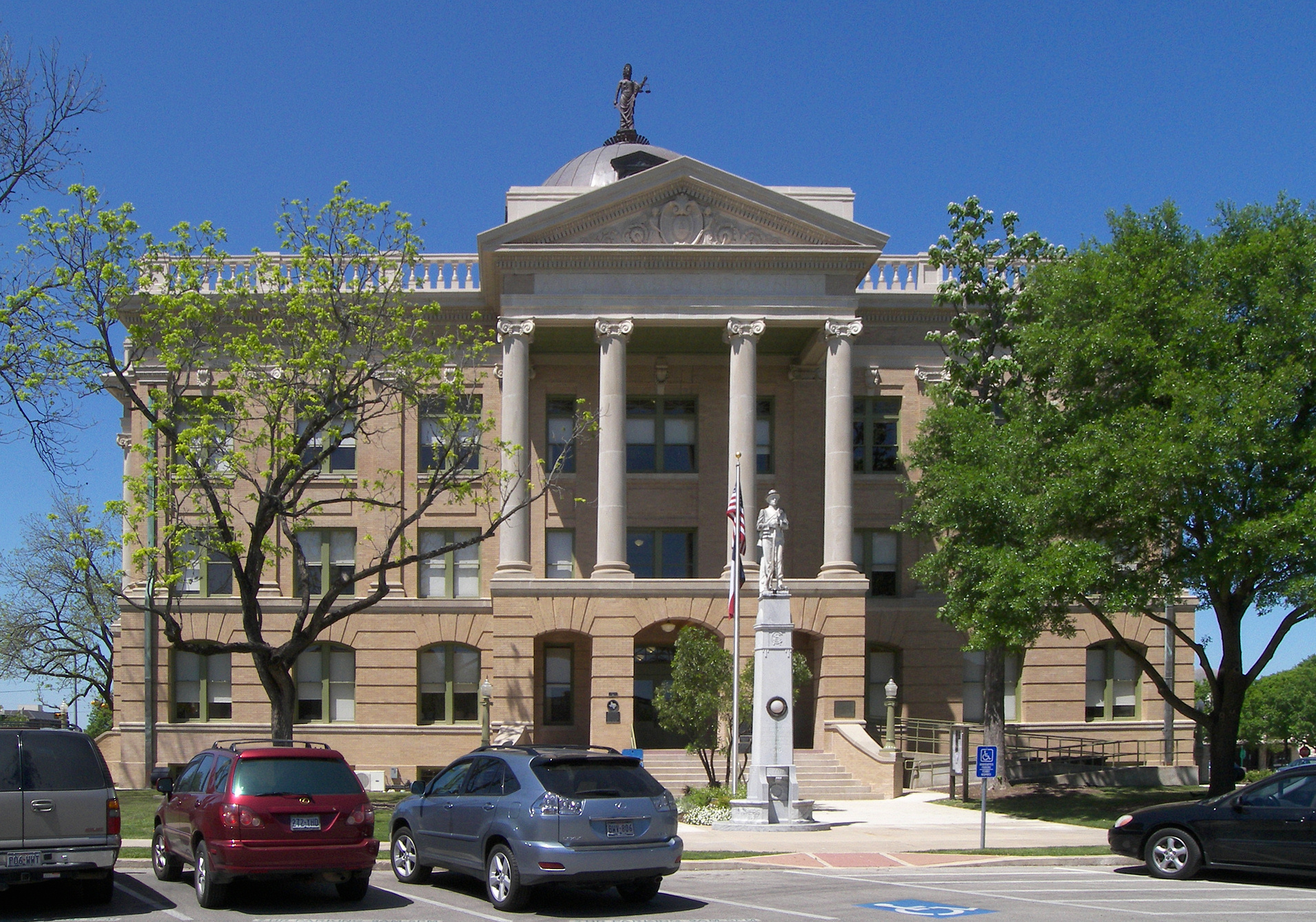
- The district surrounds the Williamson County Courthouse
- Interactive map of Williamson County Courthouse Historic District
- Location: Georgetown, Texas, United States
- Coordinates: 30°38′12″N 97°40′39″W
- Architectural style: Neoclassical, late Victorian
- NRHP reference No.: 77001480 (original); 86000955 (increase)

Significant dates
- Added to NRHP: July 26, 1977
- Boundary increase: April 29, 1986

The Williamson County Courthouse Historic District is an historic district in Georgetown, Texas, listed on the National Register of Historic Places.

== Buildings ==
The district includes the following buildings:

- Williamson County Courthouse
- Williamson County Jail
- M.B. Lockett Building
- 117 W. 7th Street
- H. C. Craig Building
- Gold's Department Store
- 103 W. 7th Street
- 101 7th Street
- Georgetown Public Library
- 103-107 E. 7th Street
- Masonic Temple
- 703-705 Main
- 707-709 Main
- Old Shafer Saddle Shop
- Evans Building
- 715 Main
- Dimmitt Building
- P. H. Dimmitt Building
- P. H. Dimmitt & Co. (Old Dimmitt Hotel), 801 Main
- Old City Hall and Fire Station
- 102 W. 8th Street
- 104-106 W. 8th Street
- 108-112 W. 8th Street
- 116 W. 8th Street
- 118 W. 8th Street
- 120 W. 8th Street
- Gas Station
- 812-824 Austin
- Palace Theatre
- 802 Austin Street
- 212-224 W. 8th Street
- 215-223 W. 8th Street
- 718 Austin Street
- Farmers State Bank
- 714 Austin Street
- 712 Austin Street
- Mileham Building
- 706 Austin Street
- 704 Austin Street
- 702 Austin
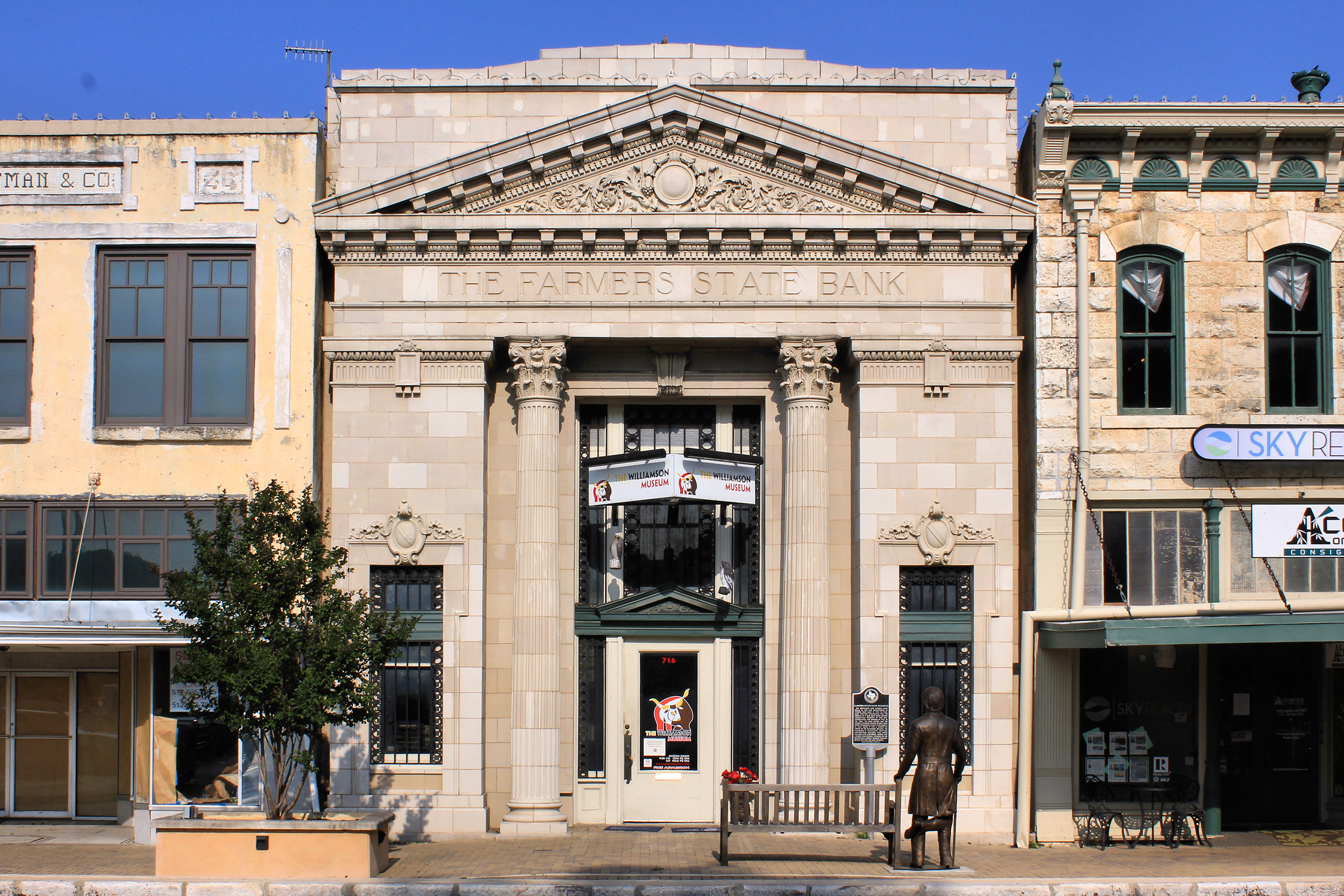
Farmers State Bank

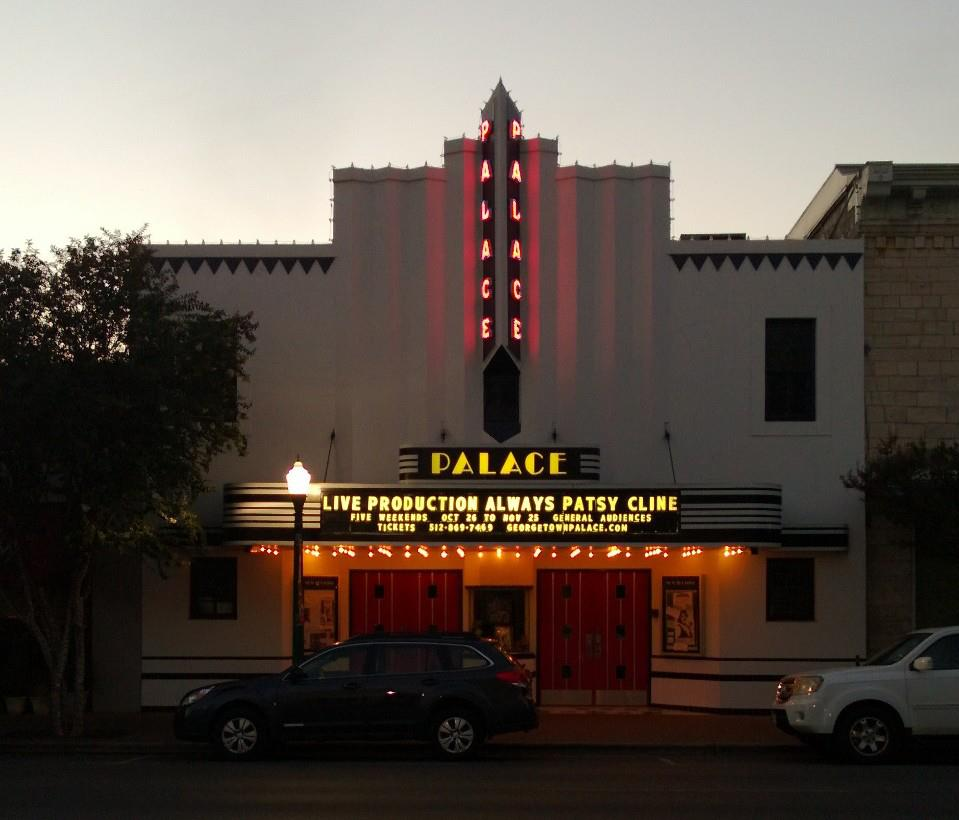
Palace Theatre

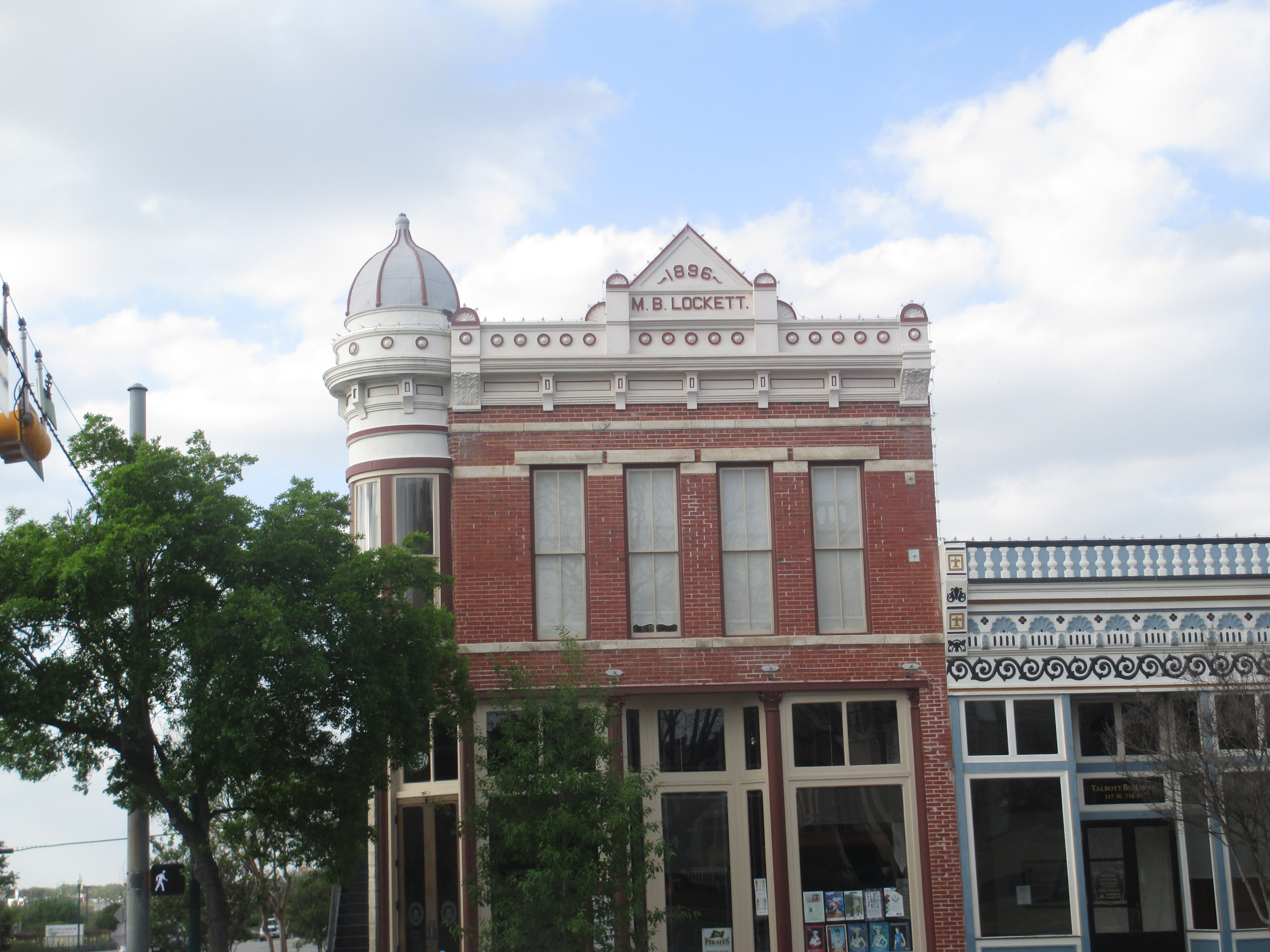
M.B. Lockett Building

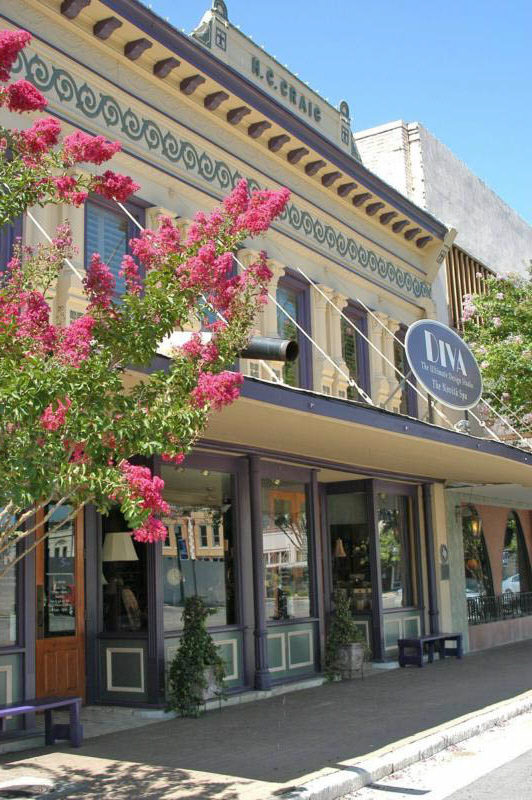
H.C. Craig Building

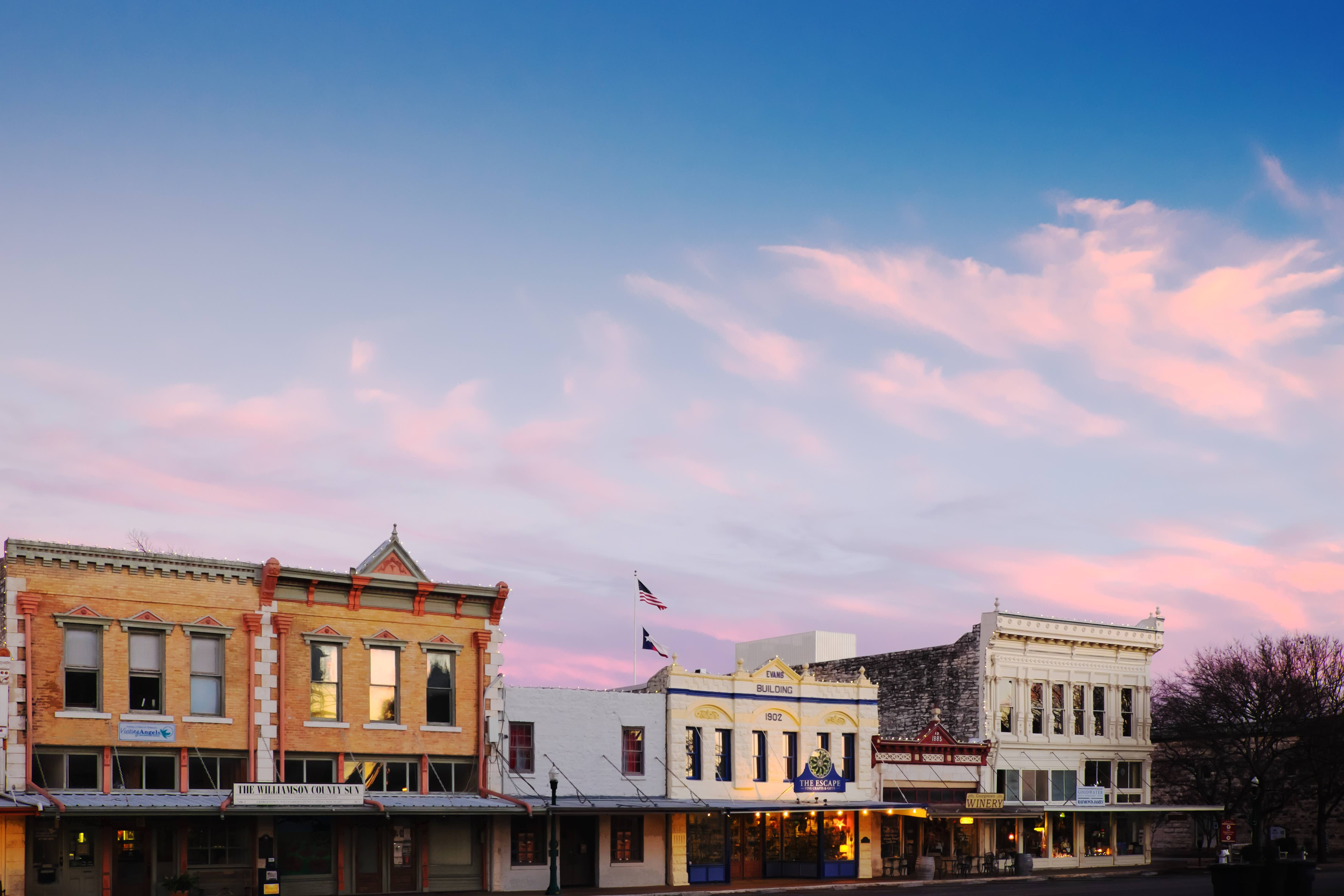
707-719 S. Main St.

== See also ==
- Belford Historic District
- National Register of Historic Places listings in Williamson County, Texas
