= Belford Historic District =

Historic district in Texas, United States

- U.S. National Register of Historic Places
- U.S. Historic district
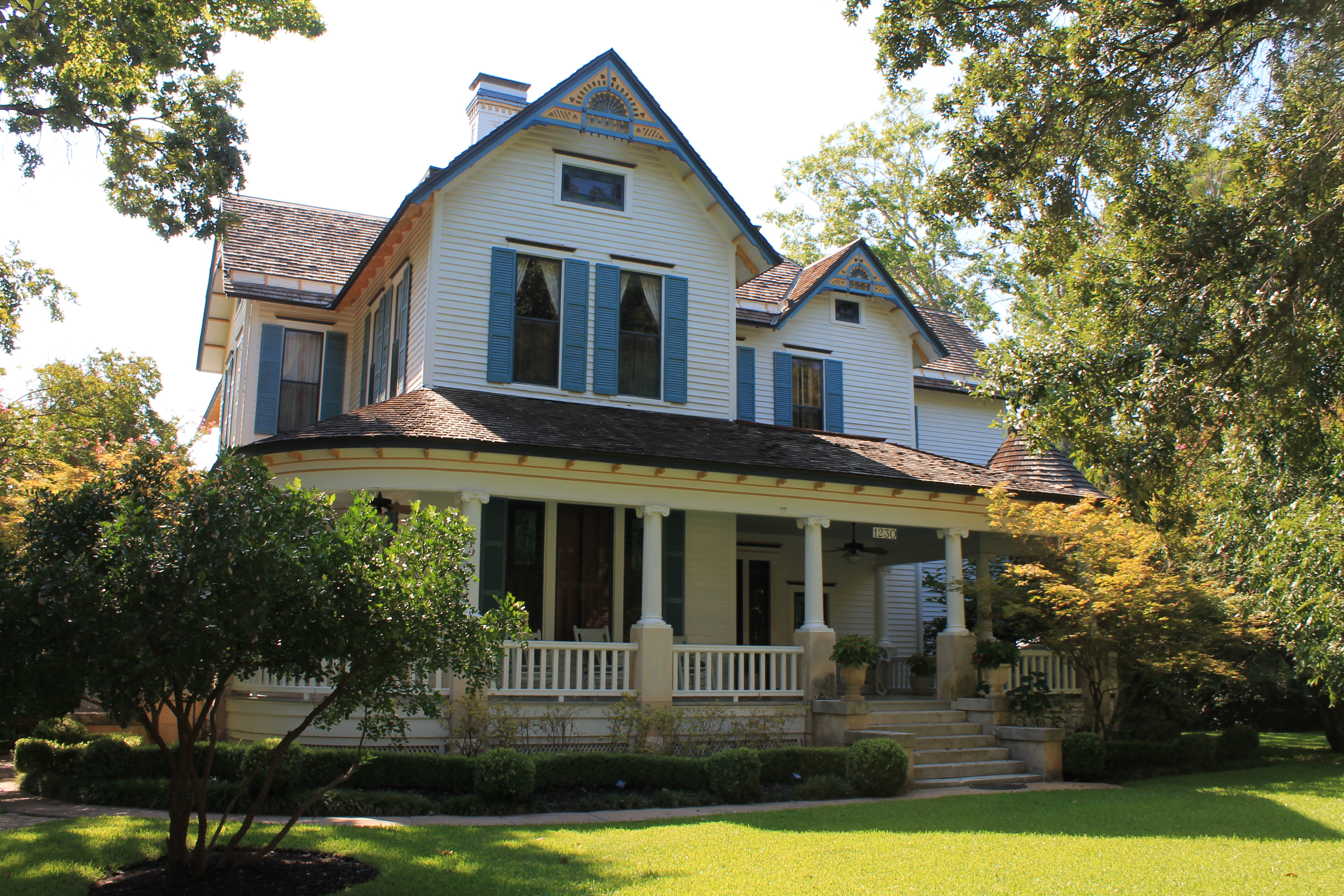
- C.S. Belford House in 2012

- Location within Texas Location within the United States
- Location: Roughly bounded by University Ave., Main, E. Eighteenth, and Austin, Georgetown, Texas
- Coordinates: 30°37′48″N 97°40′39″W
- Area: 29 acres (12 ha)
- Architect: Charles S. Belford, et al.
- Architectural style: Late 19th And Early 20th Century American Movements, Bungalow/Craftsman, Late Victorian
- MPS: Georgetown MRA
- NRHP reference No.: 86000991
- Added to NRHP: April 29, 1986

Belford Historic District is a historic district listed on the National Register of Historic Places in Georgetown, Texas. It comprises an eight-block area roughly bounded by University Avenue, the rear property lines to the east of Main Street, 19th Street, and the rear property lines to the west of Austin Street.

The district contains a high concentration of mostly early twentieth-century dwellings built by prominent local lumberman Charles S. Belford. Of the 81 structures within the district's confines, 70 are classified as contributing and add to the historic character of the area. The district provides a cross-section of Belford's career in the construction business, and a wide variety of styles and types of residences can be found, such as L- and modified L-plan houses, small bungalows, Prairie-style homes, and Belford's own Queen Anne residence. The neighborhood has long been an area where many of Georgetown's leading citizens, such as former mayor Marsh F. Smith and Judge Cooper Sansom, have lived.

== See also ==
- National Register of Historic Places listings in Williamson County, Texas
- Williamson County Courthouse Historic District
