= Williamson County Courthouse (Texas) =

Courthouse in Georgetown, Texas, U.S.

- U.S. Historic district – Contributing property
- Texas State Antiquities Landmark
- Recorded Texas Historic Landmark
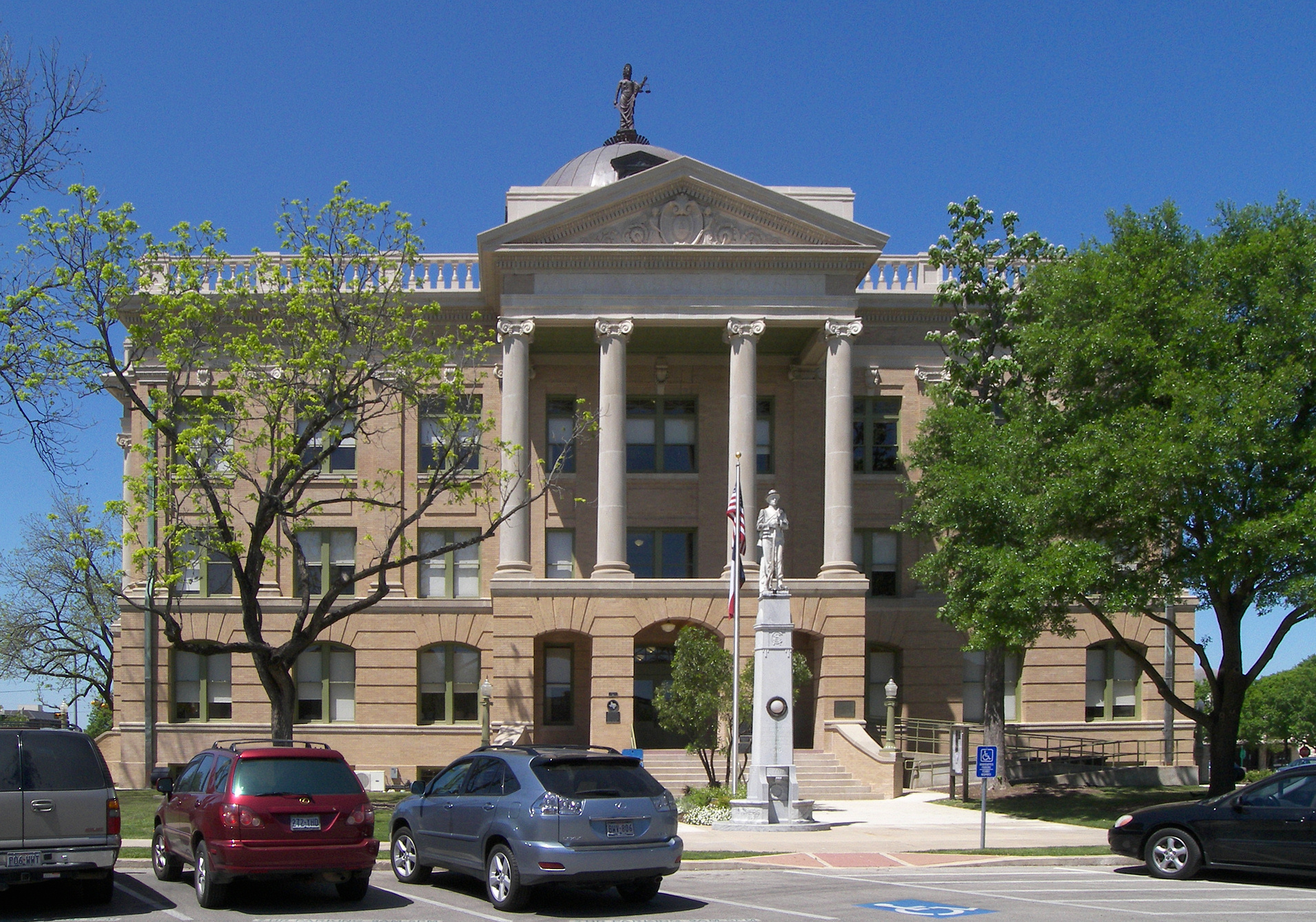
- Williamson County Courthouse in 2008

- Location within Texas Location within the United States
- Location: 710 S. Main St., Georgetown, Texas, U.S.
- Coordinates: 30°38′13″N 97°40′39″W
- Built: 1911
- Built by: W.C. Whitney
- Architect: Page Brothers
- Architectural style: Classical Revival
- Part of: Williamson County Courthouse Historic District (ID77001480)
- TSAL No.: 8200000696
- RTHL No.: 13880

Significant dates
- Designated CP: July 26, 1977
- Designated TSAL: January 1, 1983
- Designated RTHL: 1988

The Williamson County Courthouse is a courthouse in Georgetown, Texas, United States. It was designed by Charles Henry Page in 1909, and exhibits Beaux-Arts architecture. In 1923, District Attorney Dan Moody obtained an assault conviction against four members of the Ku Klux Klan at this courthouse. A Texas historical marker for the trials stands on the courthouse grounds. The Texas Historical Commission wrote, "These trials were considered the first prosecutorial success in the United States against the 1920s Klan and quickly weakened the Klan's political influence in Texas." During the 2000s, the building underwent a $9 million restoration. The courthouse was rededicated in October 2006.

The building is part of the Williamson County Courthouse Historic District. A Confederate monument is installed outside the courthouse.

== See also ==
- List of county courthouses in Texas
- List of Recorded Texas Historic Landmarks (Trinity-Zavala)
- National Register of Historic Places listings in Williamson County, Texas
