= Friedens Church of Washington =

Evangelical church in Texas

- Texas State Historic Site
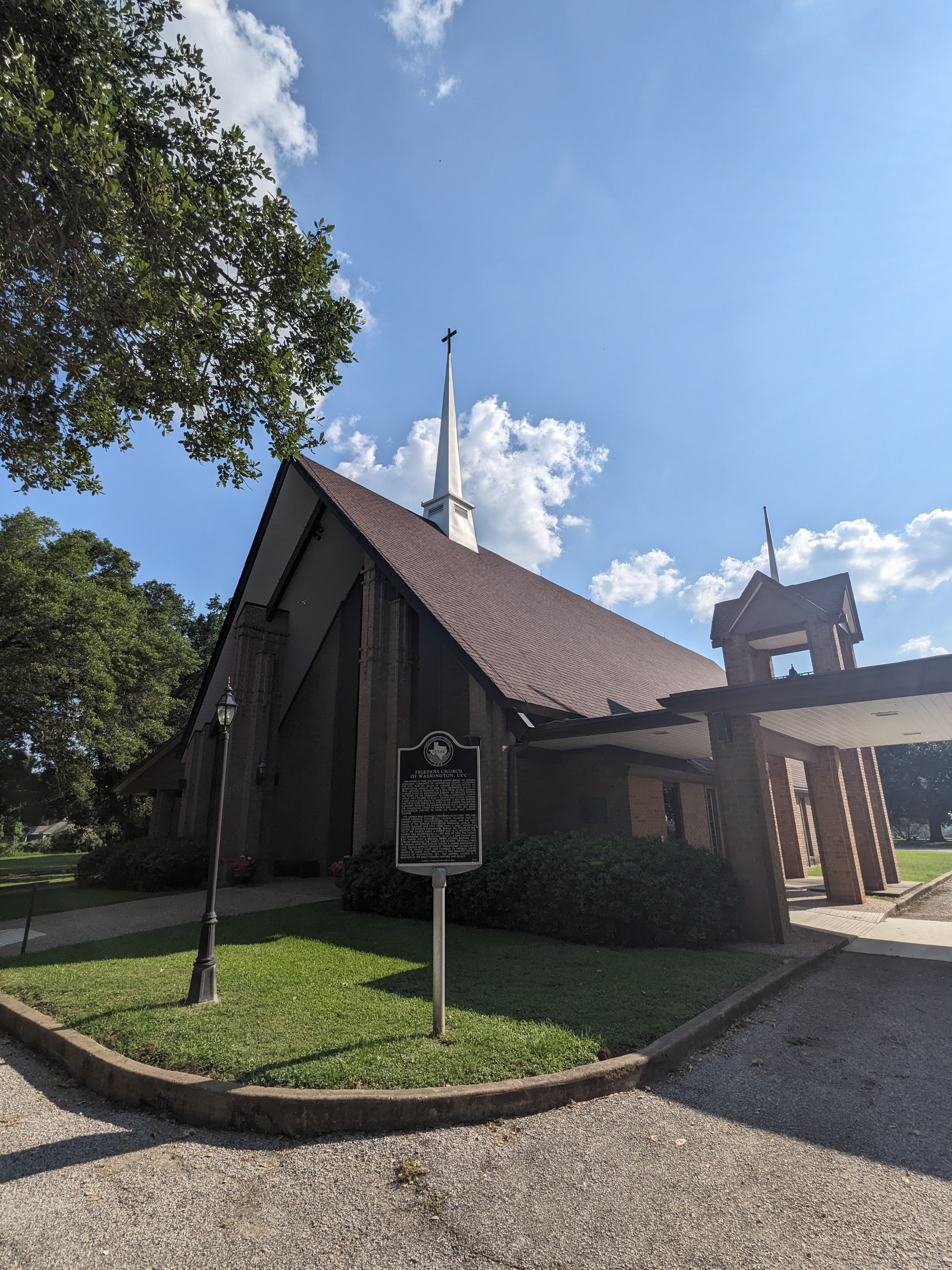
- Friedens Church in 2024

- Location within Texas Location within the United States
- Location: 20301 FM 1155, Washington, TX 77880
- Coordinates: 30°17′18.99″N 96°10′0.01″W
- TSHS No.: 17883

Friedens Church of Washington is an historic evangelical protestant church of German heritage in Washington, Texas.

== History ==
Friedens (German for Peace) was founded in 1890 by German immigrants to Washington County, former members of the Evangelical Church of Germany.

The church was constructed a mile and a half south of Washington, Texas, on two acres purchased in October 1888 for $1. A local Missouri Synod Lutheran minister from nearby William Penn, the Rev. Peter Klindworth, conducted the first services. The Rev. David Buchmueller, an Eden Seminary graduate, was hired as the first pastor and simultaneously first teacher of the church school, called the Brown's Prairie School.

In 1904, the school separated from the church and became public. In 1938, the Public Works Administration deconstructed this schoolhouse and built a new stone school building. The school was operated by Brenham ISD until 1967, and after closure was purchased back by the church in 1970.

The church was lost to fire and rebuilt in the early 1970s. It was originally affiliated with the Evangelical Synod, and later through merger the Evangelical & Reformed Church, then the United Church of Christ. In 2022, the church left the UCC to become independent. A Texas Historical Marker was added to the church in 2014, the school in 2015 and graveyard in 2017.
