= McFaddin, Texas =

Unincorporated community in Texas, US

Coordinates: 28°33′14″N 97°00′50″W

McFaddin is an unincorporated community in Victoria County, Texas, United States. It is part of the Victoria, Texas Metropolitan Statistical Area.

The community was known as Marianna from 1906 to 1923. The population as of 2000 was 175. In 1990 It was 300. It is seated on Farm to Market 445. It was named after James A. McFaddin, a Civil War veteran. It has three Texas Historical Commission plaques.

== Geography ==
The community is near the San Antonio River and is 18 miles southwest of Victoria. A railroad runs through the town.

== Education ==
McFaddin residents are zoned to the Victoria Independent School District.
