= National Register of Historic Places listings in the Central region of Texas: Other =

This page is one of two listings of the National Register of Historic Places listings in Texas's Central region.

The Central region is an area of 20 counties defined by the Texas Comptroller for economic reporting in 2022, as mapped here. The region included 2020 population of 1.3 million, or 4.3 percent of Texas's population, with Bell County having about 30 percent of Central's population. Bell County, along with Coryell and Lampasas counties, is part of the Killeen–Temple–Fort Hood metropolitan area, a MSA.

This page covers 17 out of the 20 counties. For Bell, Coryell, and Lampasas counties, which make up the Killeen–Temple–Fort Hood metropolitan area, please see this.

To see all locations together in a map, click on "Map all coordinates using OpenSourceMap" at right.

== Bosque County ==
	Name on the Register	Image	Date listed	Location	City or town	Description
1	J. H. Bekken House	J. H. Bekken House	July 22, 1983 (#83003095)	NW of Clifton; 31°47′47″N 97°36′48″W	Clifton	Part of Norwegian Settlement of Bosque County Thematic Resource
2	Bosque County Courthouse	Bosque County Courthouse	April 13, 1977 (#77001427)	Public Sq. 31°55′22″N 97°39′26″W	Meridian	State Antiquities Landmark, Recorded Texas Historic Landmark
3	Bosque River Bridge	Bosque River Bridge	February 18, 2025 (#100011449)	0.3 miles (0.48 km) NE of JCT SH 6; 31°55′09″N 97°39′44″W	Meridian vicinity	
4	Brandhagen Houses		July 22, 1983 (#83003096)	W of Clifton on FM 182; 31°46′17″N 97°40′20″W	Clifton	Part of Norwegian Settlement of Bosque County TR
5	Bridges-Johnson House	Bridges-Johnson House	October 25, 1979 (#79003447)	Off TX 6, SW of Meridian; 31°54′24″N 97°39′54″W	Meridian	
6	Brogdon Farm	Brogdon Farm	July 22, 1983 (#83003097)	W of Clifton; 31°47′15″N 97°42′06″W	Clifton	Part of Norwegian Settlement of Bosque County TR
7	Bronstad House	Bronstad House	July 22, 1983 (#83003098)	SW of Clifton; 31°45′40″N 97°38′32″W	Clifton	Part of Norwegian Settlement of Bosque County TR
8	John and Mary Colwick Farm	John and Mary Colwick Farm	July 22, 1983 (#83003099)	SW of Clifton; 31°42′37″N 97°41′50″W	Clifton	Recorded Texas Historic Landmark; part of Norwegian Settlement of Bosque County TR
9	Colwick Homestead		November 24, 2015 (#15000835)	Address restricted	Clifton	
10	Peder Dahl Farm	Peder Dahl Farm	July 22, 1983 (#83003100)	SW of Clifton on FM 219; 31°45′12″N 97°36′23″W	Clifton	Part of Norwegian Settlement of Bosque County TR
11	Ellingson Farm		July 22, 1983 (#83003101)	W of Clifton; 31°46′43″N 97°42′40″W	Clifton	Part of Norwegian Settlement of Bosque County TR
12	Even and Petrine Erickson Farm		July 22, 1983 (#83003102)	NW of Clifton; 31°52′16″N 97°41′24″W	Clifton	Part of Norwegian Settlement of Bosque County TR
13	Ole and Elizabeth Finstad Homesite		July 22, 1983 (#83003103)	SW of Clifton on FM 219; 31°43′51″N 97°43′40″W	Clifton	Part of Norwegian Settlement of Bosque County TR
14	First National Bank Building	First National Bank Building	November 7, 1979 (#79002919)	Main and Morgan Sts. 31°55′24″N 97°39′27″W	Meridian	State Antiquities Landmark
15	Adolf and Christine Godager Homesite	Adolf and Christine Godager Homesite	July 22, 1983 (#83003104)	NW of Clifton; 31°49′38″N 97°45′44″W	Clifton	Part of Norwegian Settlement of Bosque County TR
16	Gunsten and Lofise Grimland House	Gunsten and Lofise Grimland House	July 22, 1983 (#83003105)	SW of Clifton on FM 219; 31°43′34″N 97°42′38″W	Clifton	Part of Norwegian Settlement of Bosque County TR
17	Keddel and Liv Grimland Farm	Keddel and Liv Grimland Farm	July 22, 1983 (#83003106)	SW of Clifton on FM 219; 31°43′30″N 97°42′23″W	Clifton	Part of Norwegian Settlement of Bosque County TR
18	Hoff-Ulland Farm	Hoff-Ulland Farm	July 22, 1983 (#83003107)	SW of Clifton; 31°43′27″N 97°38′02″W	Clifton	Part of Norwegian Settlement of Bosque County TR
19	Hog Creek Archeological District		July 20, 1977 (#77001428)	Address restricted	Mosheim	
20	James Jens and Martha Jenson House	James Jens and Martha Jenson House	July 22, 1983 (#83003108)	NW of Clifton on FM 2136; 31°49′24″N 97°38′51″W	Clifton	Part of Norwegian Settlement of Bosque County TR
21	Christen and Johanne Knudson Farm	Christen and Johanne Knudson Farm	July 22, 1983 (#83003109)	SW of Clifton on FM 219; 31°45′24″N 97°38′19″W	Clifton	Part of Norwegian Settlement of Bosque County TR
22	A. H. Lahlum House	A. H. Lahlum House	July 22, 1983 (#83003110)	SW of Clifton; 31°42′19″N 97°40′09″W	Clifton	Part of Norwegian Settlement of Bosque County TR
23	Martin Larson House	Martin Larson House	July 22, 1983 (#83003111)	SW of Clifton; 31°44′10″N 97°45′43″W	Clifton	Part of Norwegian Settlement of Bosque County TR
24	Eric and Martha Linberg Farm	Eric and Martha Linberg Farm	July 22, 1983 (#83003112)	W of Clifton; 31°47′06″N 97°40′39″W	Clifton	Part of Norwegian Settlement of Bosque County TR
25	Lumpkin Building	Lumpkin Building	April 9, 1998 (#98000355)	101 Main St. 31°55′24″N 97°39′25″W	Meridian	
26	Norway Mill	Norway Mill	July 22, 1983 (#83003113)	SW of Clifton on FM 182; 31°41′36″N 97°39′24″W	Clifton	Recorded Texas Historic Landmark; part of Norwegian Settlement of Bosque County TR
27	Joseph and Anna Olson Farm	Joseph and Anna Olson Farm	July 22, 1983 (#83003114)	SW of Clifton on FM 182; 31°45′12″N 97°39′36″W	Clifton	Part of Norwegian Settlement of Bosque County TR
28	Olson-Hanson Farm	Olson-Hanson Farm	July 22, 1983 (#83003115)	SW of Clifton on FM 219; 31°44′47″N 97°39′13″W	Clifton	Part of Norwegian Settlement of Bosque County TR
29	Olson-Nelson Farm	Olson-Nelson Farm	July 22, 1983 (#83003116)	W of Clifton; 31°47′24″N 97°39′44″W	Clifton	Part of Norwegian Settlement of Bosque County TR
30	John Pederson Farm	John Pederson Farm	July 22, 1983 (#83003117)	SW of Clifton on FM 219; 31°43′40″N 97°43′07″W	Clifton	Part of Norwegian Settlement of Bosque County TR
31	Ole and Ann Pierson Farm	Ole and Ann Pierson Farm	July 22, 1983 (#83003118)	W of Clifton; 31°45′37″N 97°43′05″W	Clifton	Part of Norwegian Settlement of Bosque County TR
32	Carl and Sedsel Questad Farm	Carl and Sedsel Questad Farm	July 22, 1983 (#83003119)	W of Clifton; 31°46′39″N 97°40′50″W	Clifton	Part of Norwegian Settlement of Bosque County TR
33	Reeder-Omenson Farm	Reeder-Omenson Farm	July 22, 1983 (#83003120)	SW of Clifton on FM 182; 31°41′31″N 97°39′30″W	Clifton	Part of Norwegian Settlement of Bosque County TR
34	Hans and Berthe Reierson House	Hans and Berthe Reierson House	July 22, 1983 (#83003121)	SW of Clifton; 31°45′04″N 97°44′49″W	Clifton	Part of Norwegian Settlement of Bosque County TR
35	Jens and Kari Ringness Farm	Jens and Kari Ringness Farm	July 22, 1983 (#83003122)	Sw of Clifton on FM 219; 31°43′23″N 97°41′41″W	Clifton	Part of Norwegian Settlement of Bosque County TR
36	Tom and Martha Rogstad Farm	Tom and Martha Rogstad Farm	July 22, 1983 (#83003123)	W of Clifton; 31°46′04″N 97°46′39″W	Clifton	Part of Norwegian Settlement of Bosque County TR
37	Tobias and Wilhelmine Schultz Farm	Tobias and Wilhelmine Schultz Farm	July 22, 1983 (#83003124)	SW of Clifton; 31°44′50″N 97°44′42″W	Clifton	Part of Norwegian Settlement of Bosque County TR
38	Gunarus and Ingerborg Shefstad House	Gunarus and Ingerborg Shefstad House	July 22, 1983 (#83003125)	N of Clifton; 31°47′44″N 97°35′13″W	Clifton	Part of Norwegian Settlement of Bosque County TR
39	Upper Settlement Rural Historic District	Upper Settlement Rural Historic District	July 22, 1983 (#83003126)	E of Granfills Gap off TX 22; 31°47′02″N 97°45′58″W	Cranfills Gap	Includes Recorded Texas Historic Landmarks; part of Norwegian Settlement of Bosque County TR
40	Wilson Homesite	Wilson Homesite	July 22, 1983 (#83003127)	W of Clifton; 31°46′38″N 97°37′39″W	Clifton	Part of Norwegian Settlement of Bosque County TR

== Brazos County ==
3

	Name on the Register	Image	Date listed	Location	City or town	Description
1	Allen Academy Memorial Hall		September 25, 1987 (#87001603)	1100 blk. of Ursuline; 30°40′35″N 96°21′43″W	Bryan	Historic Resources of Bryan MRA
2	Allen Block	Allen Block	September 25, 1987 (#87001604)	400-422 N. Main St. 30°40′37″N 96°22′23″W	Bryan	Historic Resources of Bryan MRA
3	R. O. Allen House-Allen Academy		September 25, 1987 (#87001605)	1120 Ursuline; 30°40′35″N 96°21′37″W	Bryan	Historic Resources of Bryan MRA
4	Armstrong House-Allen Academy		September 25, 1987 (#87001606)	1200 Ursuline; 30°40′34″N 96°21′35″W	Bryan	Historic Resources of Bryan MRA
5	R. Q. Astin House	R. Q. Astin House	September 25, 1987 (#87001607)	508 W. 26th St. 30°40′29″N 96°22′41″W	Bryan	Historic Resources of Bryan MRA
6	E. J. Blazek House	E. J. Blazek House	September 25, 1987 (#87001608)	409 W. 30th St. 30°40′13″N 96°22′39″W	Bryan	Historic Resources of Bryan MRA
7	Bryan Carnegie Library	Bryan Carnegie Library	October 27, 1976 (#76002009)	111 S. Main St. 30°40′23″N 96°22′24″W	Bryan	State Antiquities Landmark, Recorded Texas Historic Landmark
8	Bryan Compress and Warehouse	Bryan Compress and Warehouse	September 25, 1987 (#87001609)	911 N. Bryan Ave. 30°40′55″N 96°22′22″W	Bryan	Historic Resources of Bryan MRA
9	Bryan Federal Building and Post Office		December 11, 2023 (#100009605)	216 W. 26th Street; 30°40′26″N 96°22′30″W	Bryan	
10	Bryan Ice House	Bryan Ice House	September 25, 1987 (#87001610)	107 E. Martin Luther King; 30°40′48″N 96°22′20″W	Bryan	Historic Resources of Bryan MRA
11	Bryan Municipal Building	Bryan Municipal Building	February 20, 2002 (#02000116)	111 E. 27th St. 30°40′21″N 96°22′20″W	Bryan	Historic Resources of Bryan MRA
12	Cavitt House	Cavitt House	October 27, 1976 (#76002010)	713 E. 30th St. 30°40′01″N 96°22′00″W	Bryan	Recorded Texas Historic Landmark, part of East Side Historic District
13	James O. Chance House	James O. Chance House	September 25, 1987 (#87001612)	102 S. Parker Ave. 30°40′25″N 96°22′31″W	Bryan	Historic Resources of Bryan MRA
14	CSPS Lodge-Griesser Bakery	CSPS Lodge-Griesser Bakery	September 25, 1987 (#87001611)	304 N. Logan Ave. 30°40′35″N 96°22′42″W	Bryan	Historic Resources of Bryan MRA
15	East Side Historic District	East Side Historic District	September 25, 1987 (#87001613)	Roughly bounded by Houston, E. 29th, Haswell, and E. 30th Sts. 30°40′06″N 96°22′03″W	Bryan	Includes Recorded Texas Historic Landmarks; Historic Resources of Bryan MRA
16	Eugene Edge House	Eugene Edge House	September 25, 1987 (#87001614)	609 S. Ennis Ave. 30°39′54″N 96°21′57″W	Bryan	Recorded Texas Historic Landmark; Historic Resources of Bryan MRA
17	English-Dansby House	English-Dansby House	September 25, 1987 (#87001615)	204 W. 28th St. 30°40′20″N 96°22′30″W	Bryan	Historic Resources of Bryan MRA
18	English-Poindexter House	English-Poindexter House	September 25, 1987 (#87001616)	206 W. 28th St. 30°40′20″N 96°22′30″W	Bryan	Historic Resources of Bryan MRA
19	First National Bank and Trust Building	First National Bank and Trust Building	September 25, 1987 (#87001618)	120 N. Main St. 30°40′28″N 96°22′24″W	Bryan	Historic Resources of Bryan MRA
20	First State Bank and Trust Building	First State Bank and Trust Building	September 25, 1987 (#87001619)	100 W. 25th St. 30°40′29″N 96°22′25″W	Bryan	Historic Resources of Bryan MRA
21	Walter J. Higgs House	Walter J. Higgs House	September 25, 1987 (#87001620)	609 N. Tabor Ave. 30°40′44″N 96°22′17″W	Bryan	Historic Resources of Bryan MRA
22	House at 109 N. Sterling	House at 109 N. Sterling	September 25, 1987 (#87001623)	109 N. Sterling Ave. 30°40′30″N 96°22′37″W	Bryan	Historic Resources of Bryan MRA
23	House at 1401 Baker	House at 1401 Baker	September 25, 1987 (#87001621)	1401 Baker Ave. 30°40′16″N 96°21′58″W	Bryan	Historic Resources of Bryan MRA
24	House at 407 N. Parker		September 25, 1987 (#87001624)	407 N. Parker Ave. 30°40′39″N 96°22′28″W	Bryan	Historic Resources of Bryan MRA; Demolished or moved
25	House at 600 N. Washington	House at 600 N. Washington	September 25, 1987 (#87001626)	600 N. Washington Ave. 30°40′42″N 96°22′15″W	Bryan	Historic Resources of Bryan MRA
26	House at 603 E. Thirty-first	House at 603 E. Thirty-first	September 25, 1987 (#87001627)	603 E. 31st St. 30°39′58″N 96°22′08″W	Bryan	Historic Resources of Bryan MRA
27	House at 604 E. Twenty-seventh	House at 604 E. Twenty-seventh	September 25, 1987 (#87001629)	604 E. 27th 30°40′20″N 96°22′03″W	Bryan	Historic Resources of Bryan MRA
28	Humpty Dumpty Store	Humpty Dumpty Store	September 25, 1987 (#87001631)	218 N. Bryan Ave. 30°40′32″N 96°22′26″W	Bryan	Historic Resources of Bryan MRA
29	Edward J. Jenkins House	Edward J. Jenkins House	September 25, 1987 (#87001633)	607 E. 27th St. 30°40′19″N 96°22′03″W	Bryan	Recorded Texas Historic Landmark; Historic Resources of Bryan MRA
30	J. M. Jones House	J. M. Jones House	September 25, 1987 (#87001634)	812 S. Ennis Ave. 30°39′47″N 96°22′07″W	Bryan	Historic Resources of Bryan MRA
31	E. A. Kemp House	E. A. Kemp House	September 25, 1987 (#87001636)	606 W. 17th St. 30°40′58″N 96°22′41″W	Bryan	Historic Resources of Bryan MRA
32	LaSalle Hotel	LaSalle Hotel	May 26, 2000 (#00000555)	120 S. Main St. 30°40′23″N 96°22′25″W	Bryan	Recorded Texas Historic Landmark
33	McDougal-Jones House	McDougal-Jones House	September 25, 1987 (#87001637)	600 E. 27th St. 30°40′20″N 96°22′04″W	Bryan	Historic Resources of Bryan MRA
34	Moore House	Moore House	September 25, 1987 (#87001638)	500 E. 25th St. 30°40′28″N 96°22′07″W	Bryan	Historic Resources of Bryan MRA
35	Noto House		September 25, 1987 (#87001639)	900 N. Parker Ave. 30°40′53″N 96°22′28″W	Bryan	Historic Resources of Bryan MRA
36	Dr. William Holt Oliver House	Dr. William Holt Oliver House	September 25, 1987 (#87001640)	602 W. 26th St. 30°40′28″N 96°22′43″W	Bryan	Historic Resources of Bryan MRA
37	Parker Lumber Company Complex	Parker Lumber Company Complex	September 25, 1987 (#87001641)	419 N. Main St. 30°40′38″N 96°22′21″W	Bryan	Historic Resources of Bryan MRA
38	Milton Parker House	Milton Parker House	September 25, 1987 (#87001642)	200 S. Congress St. 30°40′24″N 96°22′52″W	Bryan	Historic Resources of Bryan MRA
39	Saint Andrew's Episcopal Church	Saint Andrew's Episcopal Church	September 25, 1987 (#87001646)	217 W. 26th St. 30°40′25″N 96°22′30″W	Bryan	Historic Resources of Bryan MRA
40	Saint Anthony's Catholic Church	Saint Anthony's Catholic Church	September 25, 1987 (#87001647)	306 S. Parker Ave. 30°40′16″N 96°22′32″W	Bryan	Historic Resources of Bryan MRA
41	Sausley House	Sausley House	September 25, 1987 (#87001643)	700 N. Washington Ave. 30°40′45″N 96°22′14″W	Bryan	Historic Resources of Bryan MRA
42	Old Sinclair Station	Old Sinclair Station	September 25, 1987 (#87001644)	507 S. Texas Ave. 30°40′08″N 96°22′14″W	Bryan	Historic Resources of Bryan MRA
43	Smith-Barron House	Smith-Barron House	June 20, 1988 (#87001645)	100 S. Congress St. 30°40′27″N 96°22′51″W	Bryan	Historic Resources of Bryan MRA
44	Roy C. Stone House	Roy C. Stone House	September 25, 1987 (#87001649)	715 E. 31st St. 30°39′53″N 96°22′01″W	Bryan	Historic Resources of Bryan MRA
45	Temple Freda	Temple Freda	September 22, 1983 (#83003128)	205 S. Parker Ave. 30°40′21″N 96°22′30″W	Bryan	
46	Minnie Zulch Zimmerman House	Minnie Zulch Zimmerman House	September 25, 1987 (#87001650)	308 N. Washington Ave. 30°40′34″N 96°22′16″W	Bryan	Historic Resources of Bryan MRA

== Burleson County ==
4

	Name on the Register	Image	Date listed	Location	City or town	Description
1	Thomas and Mary Kraitchar Jr. House	Thomas and Mary Kraitchar Jr. House	July 11, 2002 (#02000731)	200 E. Buck St. 30°31′58″N 96°41′29″W	Caldwell	Recorded Texas Historic Landmark
2	Reeves-Womack House	Reeves-Womack House	February 4, 1993 (#93000002)	405 W. Fox St. 30°31′48″N 96°41′46″W	Caldwell	Recorded Texas Historic Landmark

== Falls County ==
6

	Name on the Register	Image	Date listed	Location	City or town	Description
1	Falls County Courthouse	Falls County Courthouse	December 13, 2000 (#00001532)	1 Courthouse Sq; 31°18′25″N 96°53′55″W	Marlin	State Antiquities Landmark, Recorded Texas Historic Landmark
2	Westphalia Rural Historic District	Westphalia Rural Historic District	May 15, 1996 (#96000524)	Roughly bounded by Co. Rt. 383, Pond Cr., Co. Rts. 377, 368, 372, 373, and the Falls Co. western boundary line 31°07′00″N 97°07′00″W	Westphalia	Includes Recorded Texas Historic Landmark

== Freestone County ==
7

	Name on the Register	Image	Date listed	Location	City or town	Description
1	Trinity and Brazos Valley Railroad Depot and Office Building	Trinity and Brazos Valley Railroad Depot and Office Building	March 21, 1979 (#79002940)	208 S. 3rd Ave. 31°37′33″N 96°17′07″W	Teague	State Antiquities Landmark

== Grimes County ==
8

	Name on the Register	Image	Date listed	Location	City or town	Description
1	Anderson Historic District	Anderson Historic District	March 15, 1974 (#74002072)	Anderson and environs 30°29′02″N 95°59′08″W	Anderson	Includes State Historic Site, State Antiquities Landmarks, numerous Recorded Texas Historic Landmarks
2	Foster House	Foster House	September 8, 1980 (#80004123)	E of Navasota on TX 90; 30°24′33″N 96°03′00″W	Navasota	Recorded Texas Historic Landmark
3	Navasota Commercial Historic District	Navasota Commercial Historic District	November 30, 1982 (#82001737)	Roughly bounded by La Salle, Holland, 9th, and Brule Sts. 30°23′15″N 96°05′23″W	Navasota	Includes Recorded Texas Historic Landmarks
4	P. A. Smith Hotel	P. A. Smith Hotel	April 16, 1976 (#76002036)	111 Railroad St. 30°23′14″N 96°05′22″W	Navasota	Part of Navasota Commercial Historic District
5	Piedmont Springs Archeological Site	Piedmont Springs Archeological Site	July 29, 1982 (#82004506)	Address restricted	Anderson	Recorded Texas Historic Landmark
6	Steele House	Steele House	June 13, 1978 (#78002939)	217 Brewer St. 30°23′20″N 96°05′03″W	Navasota	Recorded Texas Historic Landmark

== Hamilton County ==
9

	Name on the Register	Image	Date listed	Location	City or town	Description
1	Hamilton County Courthouse	Hamilton County Courthouse	September 4, 1980 (#80004125)	Public Sq. 31°42′13″N 98°07′23″W	Hamilton	State Antiquities Landmark, Recorded Texas Historic Landmark

== Hill County ==
10

	Name on the Register	Image	Date listed	Location	City or town	Description
1	J. T. Baker Farmstead		March 17, 1992 (#92000138)	1.2 mi (1.9 km). N of Blum between TX 174 and the Nolan R. 32°09′30″N 97°23′18″W	Blum	Recorded Texas Historic Landmark
2	Bear Creek Shelter Site	Bear Creek Shelter Site	October 19, 1978 (#78002955)	Address restricted	Huron	
3	Buzzard Cave	Buzzard Cave	July 18, 1974 (#74002270)	Address restricted	Lake Whitney	
4	Farmers National Bank	Farmers National Bank	March 30, 1984 (#84001871)	68 W. Elm St. 32°00′37″N 97°07′51″W	Hillsboro	Recorded Texas Historic Landmark
5	Gebhardt Bakery	Gebhardt Bakery	March 30, 1984 (#84001873)	119 E. Franklin St. 32°00′42″N 97°07′44″W	Hillsboro	Recorded Texas Historic Landmark
6	Grimes Garage	Grimes Garage	March 30, 1984 (#84001875)	110 N. Waco St. 32°00′44″N 97°07′47″W	Hillsboro	
7	Grimes House	Grimes House	March 30, 1984 (#84001877)	Country Club Rd. and Corporation St. 32°00′46″N 97°06′51″W	Hillsboro	
8	Hill County Courthouse	Hill County Courthouse	June 21, 1971 (#71000939)	Courthouse Sq. 32°00′40″N 97°07′50″W	Hillsboro	Recorded Texas Historic Landmark
9	Hill County Jail	Hill County Jail	May 28, 1981 (#81000631)	N. Waco St. 32°00′51″N 97°07′46″W	Hillsboro	Recorded Texas Historic Landmark
10	Hillsboro Cotton Mills		March 30, 1984 (#84001878)	220 N. Houston St. 32°00′46″N 97°08′05″W	Hillsboro	Demolished
11	Hillsboro Residential Historic District	Hillsboro Residential Historic District	July 9, 1984 (#84001879)	Roughly bounded by Country Club Rd., Thompson, Corsicana, Pleasant, Franklin, and Elm Sts. 32°00′46″N 97°07′14″W	Hillsboro	Includes multiple Recorded Texas Historic Landmarks
12	Kyle Shelter	Kyle Shelter	July 9, 1974 (#74002078)	Address restricted	Lake Whitney Estates	
13	McKenzie Site	McKenzie Site	November 25, 1977 (#77001451)	Address restricted	Hillsboro	
14	Missouri-Kansas-Texas Company Railroad Station	Missouri-Kansas-Texas Company Railroad Station	December 19, 1979 (#79002978)	Covington St. 32°00′46″N 97°07′52″W	Hillsboro	State Antiquities Landmark, Recorded Texas Historic Landmark
15	Nolan River Bridge 303-A of the Gulf, Colorado and Santa Fe Railway	Nolan River Bridge 303-A of the Gulf, Colorado and Santa Fe Railway	December 4, 2012 (#12001001)	Cty. Rd. 1127 at Nolan R. 32°08′50″N 97°23′49″W	Blum	
16	Old Rock Saloon	Old Rock Saloon	March 30, 1984 (#84001881)	58 W. Elm St. 32°00′37″N 97°07′49″W	Hillsboro	
17	Pictograph Cave	Pictograph Cave	March 13, 1974 (#74002079)	Address restricted	Lake Whitney	
18	Sheep Cave	Sheep Cave	July 9, 1974 (#74002077)	Address restricted	Blum	
19	Sturgis National Bank	Sturgis National Bank	March 30, 1984 (#84001889)	S. Waco and W. Elm Sts. 32°00′37″N 97°07′48″W	Hillsboro	
20	Tarlton Building	Tarlton Building	March 30, 1984 (#84001892)	110 E. Franklin St. 32°00′41″N 97°07′44″W	Hillsboro	
21	Joe E. Turner House	Joe E. Turner House	April 13, 1977 (#77001452)	3 mi (4.8 km). E of Itasca on SR 934; 32°10′22″N 97°05′30″W	Itasca	Recorded Texas Historic Landmark
22	U.S. Post Office	U.S. Post Office	March 30, 1984 (#84001894)	118 S. Waco St. 32°00′35″N 97°07′48″W	Hillsboro	Recorded Texas Historic Landmark
23	Western Union Building	Western Union Building	March 30, 1984 (#84001896)	107 S. Covington St. 32°00′42″N 97°07′44″W	Hillsboro	

== Leon County ==
	Name on the Register	Image	Date listed	Location	City or town	Description
1	Leon County Courthouse and Jails	Leon County Courthouse and Jails	December 12, 1977 (#77001458)	Public Sq; 31°15′30″N 95°58′41″W	Centerville	State Antiquities Landmark, includes Recorded Texas Historic Landmark

== Limestone County ==
	Name on the Register	Image	Date listed	Location	City or town	Description
1	Booker T. Washington Emancipation Proclamation Park	Booker T. Washington Emancipation Proclamation Park	May 24, 1976 (#76002046)	W side of Lake Mexia, 9 mi (14 km). W of Mexia; 31°39′17″N 96°35′56″W	Mexia	
2	Joseph E. Johnston Confederate Reunion Grounds	Joseph E. Johnston Confederate Reunion Grounds	April 2, 1976 (#76002048)	4 mi (6.4 km). W of Mexia on SR 1633; 31°37′59″N 96°33′36″W	Mexia	
3	Liberty Square Apartments	Liberty Square Apartments	August 29, 2018 (#10002847)	Roughly bounded by N Leon, W Sabine, N Preston, W Jacinto & N Fannin Sts. 31°31′43″N 96°32′10″W	Groesbeck	
4	Liberty Village Apartments	Liberty Village Apartments	August 29, 2018 (#10002846)	215 Elwood Enge Dr. & 612 S Ellis St. 31°31′03″N 96°32′19″W	Groesbeck	
5	Texas Hall, Old Trinity University	Texas Hall, Old Trinity University	July 12, 1978 (#78002971)	College and Westminster Sts. 31°44′38″N 96°32′43″W	Tehuacana	
6	Vinson Site	Vinson Site	January 17, 1991 (#90001530)	Address restricted	Tehuacana	

== Madison County ==
	Name on the Register	Image	Date listed	Location	City or town	Description
1	Shapira Hotel	Shapira Hotel	September 8, 1980 (#80004140)	209 N. Madison St. 30°57′01″N 95°54′53″W	Madisonville	Recorded Texas Historic Landmark

== McLennan County ==
15

	Name on the Register	Image	Date listed	Location	City or town	Description
1	Artesian Manufacturing and Bottling Company Building	Artesian Manufacturing and Bottling Company Building	May 26, 1983 (#83003152)	300 S. 5th St. 31°33′18″N 97°07′47″W	Waco	Part of Waco Downtown Historic District, currently houses the Dr Pepper Museum
2	Castle Heights Historic District	Castle Heights Historic District	November 17, 2009 (#07000495)	Roughly bounded by Waco Dr. (U.S. Route 84), Oriental Rd., Franklin Ave., and 39th St. 31°31′58″N 97°09′40″W	Waco	Includes Recorded Texas Historic Landmark (RTHL)
3	Madison Cooper House	Madison Cooper House	July 8, 1982 (#82004514)	1801 Austin Ave. 31°32′46″N 97°08′39″W	Waco	
4	Earle-Napier-Kinnard House	Earle-Napier-Kinnard House	March 11, 1971 (#71001017)	814 S. 4th St. 31°34′43″N 97°07′21″W	Waco	RHTL
5	Forsgard Homestead	Forsgard Homestead	November 13, 2003 (#03001161)	1116-1122 N. 4th St. 31°33′51″N 97°08′24″W	Waco	RHTL
6	Fort House	Fort House	October 15, 1970 (#70000849)	503 E. 4th St. 31°33′14″N 97°07′35″W	Waco	RTHL
7	Hippodrome	Hippodrome	April 28, 1983 (#83003153)	724 Austin Ave. 31°33′16″N 97°08′03″W	Waco	RTHL, part of Waco Downtown Historic District
8	William Decker Johnson Hall		March 3, 2025 (#100011472)	1020 Elm Avenue; 31°34′17″N 97°07′18″W	Waco	
9	John Wesley Mann House	John Wesley Mann House	April 19, 1972 (#72001466)	100 Mill St. 31°34′02″N 97°08′01″W	Waco	RTHL
10	McClennan County Courthouse	McClennan County Courthouse	December 14, 1978 (#78003095)	Public Square; 31°33′26″N 97°08′01″W	Waco	State Antiquities Landmark, RTHL, part of Waco Downtown Historic District
11	McCulloch House	McCulloch House	September 14, 1972 (#72001467)	406 Columbus Ave. 31°33′32″N 97°07′58″W	Waco	Recorded Texas Historic Landmark
12	McDermott Motors Building	McDermott Motors Building	January 14, 2004 (#03001415)	1125 Washington Ave. 31°33′08″N 97°08′22″W	Waco	Part of Waco Downtown Historic District
13	Praetorian Building	Praetorian Building	July 26, 1984 (#84001911)	601 Franklin Ave. 31°33′18″N 97°07′55″W	Waco	Part of Waco Downtown Historic District
14	Rotan-Dossett House	Rotan-Dossett House	January 29, 1979 (#79003151)	1503 Columbus Ave. 31°33′01″N 97°08′35″W	Waco	RTHL
15	St. James Methodist Episcopal Church	St. James Methodist Episcopal Church	September 12, 2019 (#100004374)	600 South Second St. 31°33′18″N 97°07′26″W	Waco	
16	Texas Textile Mills-L.L. Sams Company Historic District	Texas Textile Mills-L.L. Sams Company Historic District	December 13, 2004 (#03000807)	2100 River St. 31°32′42″N 97°06′31″W	Waco	
17	Torrey's Trading House No. 2 Site	Torrey's Trading House No. 2 Site	June 5, 1975 (#75002074)	Address restricted	Waco	
18	Veterans Administration Hospital Historic District	Veterans Administration Hospital Historic District	July 18, 1994 (#94000672)	4800 Memorial Dr. 31°30′40″N 97°09′54″W	Waco	
19	Waco Downtown Historic District	Waco Downtown Historic District	February 3, 2012 (#11001094)	Roughly bounded by Mary Ave., S. 14th St., Columbus Ave., and S. University Parks Dr. 31°33′18″N 97°08′02″W	Waco	Includes State Antiquities Landmark, RTHLs
20	Waco Drug Company	Waco Drug Company	March 24, 2008 (#08000241)	225 S. 5th St. 31°33′19″N 97°07′50″W	Waco	Part of Waco Downtown Historic District
21	Waco High School	Waco High School	March 17, 2009 (#09000140)	815 Columbus; 31°33′22″N 97°08′15″W	Waco	Part of Waco Downtown Historic District
22	Waco Suspension Bridge	Waco Suspension Bridge	June 22, 1970 (#70000850)	At Bridge St., over the Brazos River; 31°33′40″N 97°07′39″W	Waco	State Antiquities Landmark
23	Washington Avenue Bridge	Washington Avenue Bridge	February 20, 1998 (#98000143)	Washington and Elm Aves. across the Brazos River; 31°33′40″N 97°07′43″W	Waco	

== Milam County ==
	Name on the Register	Image	Date listed	Location	City or town	Description
1	Dr. Nathan and Lula Cass House	Dr. Nathan and Lula Cass House	February 8, 1991 (#91000037)	502 N. Travis Ave; 30°51′16″N 96°58′38″W	Cameron	Recorded Texas Historic Landmark
2	Milam County Courthouse and Jail	Milam County Courthouse and Jail	December 20, 1977 (#77001460)	Public Sq. and S. Fannin and E. 1st St. 30°51′00″N 96°58′34″W	Cameron	State Antiquities Landmark, includes Recorded Texas Historic Landmarks
3	International & Great Northern Railroad Passenger Depot	International & Great Northern Railroad Passenger Depot	September 13, 2006 (#06000824)	11 N. Main St. 31°18′25″N 96°53′55″W	Rockdale	Recorded Texas Historic Landmark
4	R. F. and Minta Pool House	R. F. and Minta Pool House	July 11, 2014 (#14000403)	901 East 8th Street; 30°51′12″N 96°58′00″W	Cameron	Recorded Texas Historic Landmark
5	San Xavier Mission Complex Archeological District	San Xavier Mission Complex Archeological District	July 27, 1973 (#73001969)	Address restricted	Rockdale	

== Mills County ==
	Name on the Register	Image	Date listed	Location	City or town	Description
1	Mills County Courthouse	Mills County Courthouse	November 8, 2000 (#00001359)	1011 Fourth St. 31°26′59″N 98°34′10″W	Goldthwaite	Part of State Antiquities Landmark, Recorded Texas Historic Landmark
2	Mills County Jailhouse	Mills County Jailhouse	May 8, 1979 (#79002994)	Fisher and 5th Sts. 31°26′58″N 98°34′07″W	Goldthwaite	Part of State Antiquities Landmark, Recorded Texas Historic Landmark
3	Regency Suspension Bridge	Regency Suspension Bridge	December 12, 1976 (#76002052)	0.75 mi (1.21 km). S of Regency at Colorado River; 31°24′37″N 98°50′45″W	Regency	State Antiquities Landmark; extends into San Saba County

== Robertson County ==
	Name on the Register	Image	Date listed	Location	City or town	Description
1	Robert C. Allen House	Robert C. Allen House	August 11, 1982 (#82004521)	402 Cedar St. 30°52′44″N 96°35′45″W	Hearne	Recorded Texas Historic Landmark
2	Calvert Historic District	Calvert Historic District	April 3, 1978 (#78002978)	Roughly bounded by Main, Garritt, Pin Oak, Maple, and Barton Sts. 30°58′48″N 96°40′16″W	Calvert	Includes Recorded Texas Historic Landmarks
3	Franklin Carnegie Library	Franklin Carnegie Library	November 25, 2005 (#05001337)	315 East Decherd; 31°01′38″N 96°29′03″W	Franklin	Recorded Texas Historic Landmark
4	Hammond House	Hammond House	October 28, 1970 (#70000759)	Bounded by Burnet, China, Elm, and Hanna Sts. 30°58′51″N 96°40′13″W	Calvert	Recorded Texas Historic Landmark; part of Calvert Historic District
5	Robertson County Courthouse and Jail	Robertson County Courthouse and Jail	December 22, 1977 (#77001472)	Public Sq. 31°01′37″N 96°29′14″W	Franklin	State Antiquities Landmark, includes Recorded Texas Historic Landmark

== San Saba County ==
	Name on the Register	Image	Date listed	Location	City or town	Description
1	Regency Suspension Bridge	Regency Suspension Bridge	December 12, 1976 (#76002052)	0.75 miles (1.21 km) south of Regency at the Colorado River; 31°24′37″N 98°50′45″W	Regency	Extends into Mills County
2	San Saba County Courthouse	San Saba County Courthouse	May 1, 2003 (#03000328)	500 E. Wallace; 31°11′43″N 98°43′00″W	San Saba	State Antiquities Landmark, Recorded Texas Historic Landmark
3	US 190 Bridge at the Colorado River	US 190 Bridge at the Colorado River	October 10, 1996 (#96001125)	U.S. Route 190 at the Lampasas County line 31°13′04″N 98°33′50″W	Lometa	

== Washington County ==
20

	Name on the Register	Image	Date listed	Location	City or town	Description
1	Allcorn-Kokemoor Farmstead		August 6, 1998 (#98001015)	Independence Rd., 5 mi (8.0 km). north of Brenham; 30°13′22″N 96°22′51″W	Brenham	Recorded Texas Historic Landmark
2	Isaac Applewhite House	Isaac Applewhite House	February 20, 1985 (#85000342)	Church St. 30°08′35″N 96°15′09″W	Chappell Hill	Recorded Texas Historic Landmark; Historic Resources of Chappell Hill MRA
3	Bassett and Bassett Banking House	Bassett and Bassett Banking House	April 21, 1983 (#83003168)	222 E. Main St. 30°10′03″N 96°23′46″W	Brenham	Recorded Texas Historic Landmark, part of Brenham Downtown Historic District
4	Baylor University Female Department		August 12, 2024 (#100006856)	8415 Old Baylor College Rd. 30°19′09″N 96°21′15″W	Independence	
5	Baylor University Male Department		January 11, 2024 (#100006857)	10060 Sam Houston Rd. 30°18′58″N 96°20′48″W	Independence	
6	Becker-Hildebrandt House	Becker-Hildebrandt House	March 29, 1990 (#90000456)	1402 S. Church; 30°09′22″N 96°23′46″W	Brenham	Historic and Architectural Resources of Brenham MPS
7	Blinn College	Blinn College	March 29, 1990 (#90000446)	Roughly bounded by Third, Jackson, Fifth, Green, College, and High; 30°09′34″N 96°24′15″W	Brenham	Historic district encompasses the historic core of Blinn College and the neighboring residential area. Includes Recorded Texas Historic Landmarks; Historic and Architectural Resources of Brenham MPS.
8	Blue Bell Creameries Complex	Blue Bell Creameries Complex	March 29, 1990 (#90000468)	602 Creamery; 30°09′59″N 96°23′24″W	Brenham	Historic and Architectural Resources of Brenham MPS
9	Brenham Downtown Historic District	Brenham Downtown Historic District	March 10, 2004 (#04000154)	Roughly bounded W. Vulcan, E. Vulcan, South Market, West First, Bassett, S. Austin and N. Austin; 30°10′00″N 96°23′49″W	Brenham	Includes Recorded Texas Historic Landmarks; Historic and Architectural Resources of Brenham MPS
10	Brenham High School	Brenham High School	March 29, 1990 (#90000466)	1301 S. Market; 30°09′32″N 96°23′36″W	Brenham	Historic and Architectural Resources of Brenham MPS
11	Brenham High School Gymnasium	Brenham High School Gymnasium	March 29, 1990 (#90000467)	1301 S. Market; 30°09′34″N 96°23′33″W	Brenham	Historic and Architectural Resources of Brenham MPS
12	Brenham School	Brenham School	March 29, 1990 (#90000454)	600 E. Alamo; 30°10′02″N 96°23′36″W	Brenham	Recorded Texas Historic Landmark; Historic and Architectural Resources of Brenham MPS
13	Brenham Water Works	Brenham Water Works	March 29, 1990 (#90000465)	1105 S. Austin; 30°09′31″N 96°23′51″W	Brenham	Historic and Architectural Resources of Brenham MPS
14	Brockschmidt-Miller House	Brockschmidt-Miller House	March 29, 1990 (#90000451)	806 S. Day; 30°09′38″N 96°24′01″W	Brenham	Historic and Architectural Resources of Brenham MPS
15	John M. Brown House	John M. Brown House	April 16, 1975 (#75002010)	South of Washington on FM 912; 30°18′37″N 96°10′01″W	Washington	
16	W. W. Browning House	W. W. Browning House	January 20, 1972 (#72001376)	South of Chappell Hill near the junction of U.S. 290 and FM 1155; 30°07′34″N 96°15′27″W	Chappell Hill	Recorded Texas Historic Landmark
17	Burton Commercial Historic District	Burton Commercial Historic District	June 11, 1991 (#91000709)	Roughly bounded by Railroad, Live Oak, Brazos and Burton, including area south of Railroad between Washington and Texas Sts. 30°10′54″N 96°35′45″W	Burton	Includes Recorded Texas Historic Landmarks; Historic and Architectural Resources of Burton MPS
18	Burton Farmers Gin	Burton Farmers Gin	June 11, 1991 (#91000712)	Main St. southeast of Burton St. 30°10′40″N 96°35′38″W	Burton	Recorded Texas Historic Landmark; Historic and Architectural Resources of Burton MPS
19	Burton High School	Burton High School	June 11, 1991 (#91000711)	Junction of Main St. and FM 390; 30°11′02″N 96°35′53″W	Burton	Recorded Texas Historic Landmark; Historic and Architectural Resources of Burton MPS
20	Chappell Hill Circulating Library	Chappell Hill Circulating Library	February 20, 1985 (#85000343)	Cedar St. 30°08′32″N 96°15′19″W	Chappell Hill	Historic Resources of Chappell Hill MRA
21	Chappell Hill Methodist Episcopal Church	Chappell Hill Methodist Episcopal Church	February 20, 1985 (#85000344)	Church St. 30°08′29″N 96°15′09″W	Chappell Hill	Recorded Texas Historic Landmark; Historic Resources of Chappell Hill MRA
22	Chappell Hill Public School and Chappell Hill Female College Bell	Chappell Hill Public School and Chappell Hill Female College Bell	February 20, 1985 (#85000345)	Poplar St. 30°08′27″N 96°15′10″W	Chappell Hill	Historic Resources of Chappell Hill MRA
23	East Brenham	East Brenham	March 29, 1990 (#90000445)	Roughly bounded by Crockett, Embrey, E. Academy, Ross, E. Main, Market, Sycamore, Cottonwood, Botts, McIntyre, and Alma; 30°10′15″N 96°23′37″W	Brenham	Includes Recorded Texas Historic Landmarks; Historic and Architectural Resources of Brenham MPS
24	E. King Felder House	E. King Felder House	February 20, 1985 (#85000346)	Haller st. 30°08′28″N 96°15′50″W	Chappell Hill	Historic Resources of Chappell Hill MRA
25	Gantt-Jones House	Gantt-Jones House	November 16, 1979 (#79003022)	1.5 mi (2.4 km). northwest of Burton off SR 1697; 30°12′19″N 96°37′04″W	Burton	Recorded Texas Historic Landmark
26	Giddings-Stone Mansion	Giddings-Stone Mansion	June 24, 1976 (#76002080)	204 E. Stone St. 30°08′57″N 96°23′31″W	Brenham	Recorded Texas Historic Landmark
27	Giddings-Wilkin House	Giddings-Wilkin House	December 12, 1976 (#76002081)	805 Crocket St. 30°10′25″N 96°23′29″W	Brenham	Recorded Texas Historic Landmark
28	Hatfield Plantation		January 25, 1971 (#71000971)	Northwest of Brenham off FM 912; 30°18′28″N 96°10′34″W	Brenham	Recorded Texas Historic Landmark
29	Hodde Drugstore	Hodde Drugstore	June 11, 1991 (#91000713)	Main St. southeast of Burton St. 30°10′50″N 96°35′36″W	Burton	Historic and Architectural Resources of Burton MPS
30	Edmund Holle House	Edmund Holle House	March 29, 1990 (#90000458)	1002 S. Day; 30°09′32″N 96°24′00″W	Brenham	Historic and Architectural Resources of Brenham MPS
31	Mrs. Sam Houston House	Mrs. Sam Houston House	October 22, 1970 (#70000775)	FM 390, 1 block east of the junction with FM 50; 30°19′08″N 96°20′41″W	Independence	Recorded Texas Historic Landmark
32	Asa Hoxey House	Asa Hoxey House	June 29, 1976 (#76002083)	West of Independence; 30°19′12″N 96°21′59″W	Independence	
33	Kneip-Bredthauer House	Kneip-Bredthauer House	June 11, 1991 (#91000719)	SE corner of Colorado and Cedar; 30°11′06″N 96°35′46″W	Burton	Historic and Architectural Resources of Burton MPS
34	Dr. Charles Laas House	Dr. Charles Laas House	June 11, 1991 (#91000717)	NE corner of Live Oak and Colorado Sts. 30°11′04″N 96°35′44″W	Burton	Historic and Architectural Resources of Burton MPS
35	Dr. Robert Lenert House	Dr. Robert Lenert House	March 29, 1990 (#90000457)	602 S. Market; 30°09′48″N 96°23′43″W	Brenham	Historic and Architectural Resources of Brenham MPS
36	Main Building, Blinn College	Main Building, Blinn College	December 6, 1978 (#78002998)	804 College Ave. 30°09′34″N 96°24′18″W	Brenham	Recorded Texas Historic Landmark, part of Blinn College historic district
37	Main Street Historic District	Main Street Historic District	May 15, 1985 (#85001175)	Main St. 30°08′35″N 96°15′25″W	Chappell Hill	Includes Recorded Texas Historic Landmarks; Historic Resources of Chappell Hill MRA
38	Edgar Matchett House	Edgar Matchett House	March 29, 1990 (#90000462)	502 W. Main; 30°09′59″N 96°24′13″W	Brenham	Historic and Architectural Resources of Brenham MPS
39	Mt. Zion Methodist Church	Mt. Zion Methodist Church	March 29, 1990 (#90000450)	500 High; 30°09′43″N 96°24′25″W	Brenham	Historic and Architectural Resources of Brenham MPS
40	William Neumann House	William Neumann House	June 18, 1991 (#91000710)	Navasota St. west of Washington St. 30°10′40″N 96°36′11″W	Burton	Historic and Architectural Resources of Burton MPS
41	Herbert Nienstedt House	Herbert Nienstedt House	June 11, 1991 (#91000718)	NE corner of Brazos and Washington Sts. 30°10′59″N 96°35′43″W	Burton	Historic and Architectural Resources of Burton MPS
42	William Nienstedt House	William Nienstedt House	June 11, 1991 (#91000715)	SE corner of Brazos and Texas Sts. 30°10′56″N 96°35′39″W	Burton	Historic and Architectural Resources of Burton MPS
43	Pampell-Day House	Pampell-Day House	October 15, 1970 (#70000774)	409 W. Alamo St. 30°09′56″N 96°24′10″W	Brenham	Recorded Texas Historic Landmark
44	Red House		January 25, 1971 (#71000972)	Northeast of Gay Hill via TX 36 and FM 390; 30°16′55″N 96°27′27″W	Gay Hill	Recorded Texas Historic Landmark
45	Reichardt-Low House	Reichardt-Low House	March 29, 1990 (#90000455)	609 S. Austin; 30°09′45″N 96°23′54″W	Brenham	Historic and Architectural Resources of Brenham MPS
46	Reue-Eickenhorst House	Reue-Eickenhorst House	April 27, 1995 (#95000519)	FM Hwy. 2621, 0.5 mi (0.80 km). east of junction with TX 50; 30°15′03″N 96°21′20″W	Brenham	Recorded Texas Historic Landmark
47	William S. Rogers House	William S. Rogers House	February 20, 1985 (#85000347)	Cedar St. 30°08′32″N 96°15′21″W	Chappell Hill	Historic Resources of Chappell Hill MRA
48	J. R. Routt House	J. R. Routt House	February 20, 1985 (#85000348)	Chestnut St. 30°08′36″N 96°15′10″W	Chappell Hill	Historic Resources of Chappell Hill MRA
49	William Edward Sanders House	William Edward Sanders House	June 11, 1991 (#91000716)	Railroad St. southeast of US 290; 30°10′35″N 96°35′28″W	Burton	Historic and Architectural Resources of Burton MPS
50	Santa Fe Railway Company Freight Depot	Santa Fe Railway Company Freight Depot	March 29, 1990 (#90000459)	214 S. Austin; 30°09′55″N 96°24′00″W	Brenham	Part of Brenham Downtown Historic District; Historic and Architectural Resources of Brenham MPS
51	Almot Schlenker House	Almot Schlenker House	March 29, 1990 (#90000461)	405 College; 30°09′36″N 96°24′03″W	Brenham	Historic and Architectural Resources of Brenham MPS
52	Schlenker-Kolwes House	Schlenker-Kolwes House	March 29, 1990 (#90000460)	1304 S. Market; 30°09′26″N 96°23′37″W	Brenham	Historic and Architectural Resources of Brenham MPS
53	Schmidt House	Schmidt House	December 10, 1990 (#90001806)	906 W. 5th St. 30°09′28″N 96°24′23″W	Brenham	Historic and Architectural Resources of Brenham MPS
54	Fritz Paul and Emma Schroeder House	Fritz Paul and Emma Schroeder House	September 30, 1994 (#94001169)	Co. Rd. 68, north side, north of Brenham; 30°16′51″N 96°18′29″W	Brenham	Recorded Texas Historic Landmark
55	F. W. Schuerenberg House	F. W. Schuerenberg House	March 29, 1990 (#90000469)	503 W. Alamo; 30°09′55″N 96°24′12″W	Brenham	Recorded Texas Historic Landmark; Historic and Architectural Resources of Brenham MPS
56	R. A. Schuerenberg House	R. A. Schuerenberg House	March 29, 1990 (#90000463)	703 S. Market; 30°09′44″N 96°23′40″W	Brenham	Historic and Architectural Resources of Brenham MPS
57	W. E. Seelhorst House	W. E. Seelhorst House	March 29, 1990 (#90000470)	702 Seelhorst; 30°09′56″N 96°23′28″W	Brenham	Recorded Texas Historic Landmark; Historic and Architectural Resources of Brenham MPS
58	Seward Plantation	Seward Plantation	January 29, 2013 (#12001250)	10005 Farm to Market Road 390 E 30°19′46″N 96°19′56″W	Independence	
59	John Sterling Smith Jr. House	John Sterling Smith Jr. House	February 20, 1985 (#85000349)	Chestnut St. 30°08′35″N 96°15′12″W	Chappell Hill	Recorded Texas Historic Landmark; Historic Resources of Chappell Hill MRA
60	Southern Pacific Railroad Freight Depot	Southern Pacific Railroad Freight Depot	March 29, 1990 (#90000453)	306 S. Market; 30°09′57″N 96°23′46″W	Brenham	Recorded Texas Historic Landmark, part of Brenham Downtown Historic District; Historic and Architectural Resources of Brenham MPS
61	St. Mary's Catholic Church	St. Mary's Catholic Church	March 29, 1990 (#90000452)	701 Church; 30°09′42″N 96°23′49″W	Brenham	Historic and Architectural Resources of Brenham MPS
62	Stage Coach Inn	Stage Coach Inn	December 12, 1976 (#76002082)	4950 Main St. 30°08′36″N 96°15′26″W	Chappell Hill	Part of Main Street Historic District; exceptional-quality 14-room, 1850 inn is also the oldest building in Chappell Hill. Known as Hargrove House when it served as a boarding house for college students, during the antebellum period it was an important stagecoach and telegraph office on the routes between Houston & Austin and Houston & Waco. Restored in the 1970s and operated as a bed and breakfast for many years.
63	Synagogue B'nai Abraham	Synagogue B'nai Abraham	March 29, 1990 (#90000464)	302 N. Park; 30°10′05″N 96°23′53″W	Brenham	Recorded Texas Historic Landmark; Historic and Architectural Resources of Brenham MPS
64	US Post Office-Federal Building-Brenham	US Post Office-Federal Building-Brenham	March 29, 1990 (#90000449)	105 S. Market; 30°09′43″N 96°24′25″W	Brenham	Part of Brenham Downtown Historic District; Historic and Architectural Resources of Brenham MPS
65	James Walker Log House		August 21, 1989 (#89001143)	Co. Rd. 80; 30°10′24″N 96°20′03″W	Brenham	Recorded Texas Historic Landmark
66	Washington County Courthouse	Washington County Courthouse	March 29, 1990 (#90000447)	110 E. Main; 30°10′01″N 96°23′51″W	Brenham	Recorded Texas Historic Landmark, part of Brenham Downtown Historic District; Historic and Architectural Resources of Brenham MPS
67	Waverly	Waverly	April 14, 1983 (#83003169)	FR 2447; 30°08′42″N 96°15′03″W	Chappell Hill	Recorded Texas Historic Landmark
68	Wehring Shoe Shop and Residence	Wehring Shoe Shop and Residence	June 11, 1991 (#91000714)	Main St. southeast of Burton St. 30°10′47″N 96°35′36″W	Burton	Historic and Architectural Resources of Burton MPS
69	Wood-Hughes House	Wood-Hughes House	March 29, 1990 (#90000448)	614 S. Austin; 30°09′43″N 96°23′56″W	Brenham	Recorded Texas Historic Landmark; Historic and Architectural Resources of Brenham MPS
