= Kneip–Bredthauer House =

Historic building in Burton, Texas, U.S.

- U.S. National Register of Historic Places
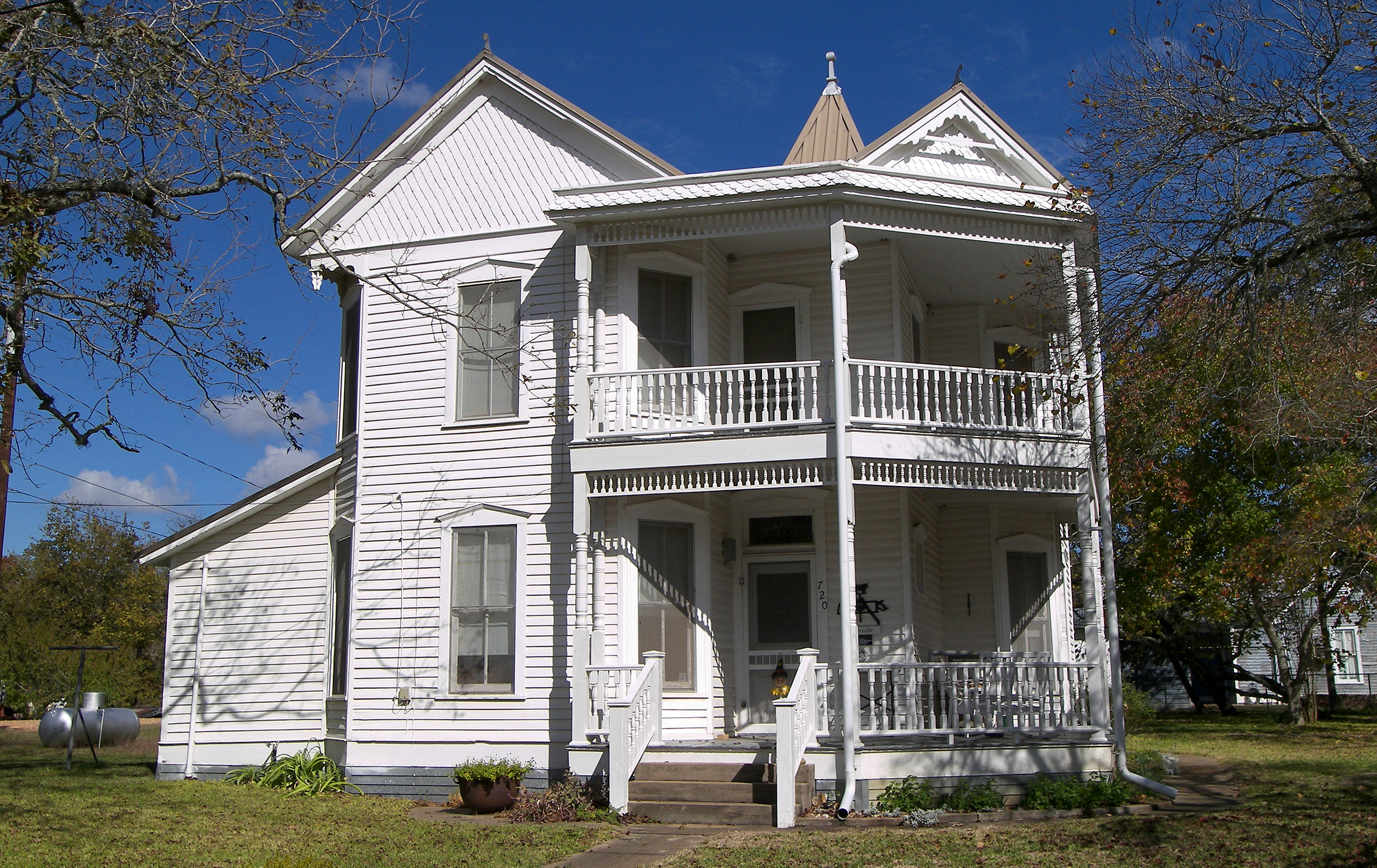
- Kneip–Bredthauer House in 2008

- Location within Texas Location within the United States
- Location: SE corner of Colorado and Cedar; Burton, Texas
- Coordinates: 30°11′5″N 96°35′44″W
- Area: 0.3 acres (0.12 ha)
- Built: 1910
- Architectural style: Queen Anne, Modified L-plan
- MPS: Burton MPS
- NRHP reference No.: 91000719
- Added to NRHP: June 11, 1991

The Kneip–Bredthauer House, located at the southeast corner of Colorado and Ceder in Burton, Texas, is a building of historical significance. The house is a two-story modified L-plan dwelling with Queen Anne detailing, which is unusual for the Burton area.

Dr. A.T. Kneip was responsible for this unusual design. Under Kneip's ownership, the house was enlarged around 1910 to its current two-story configuration. Following Kneip's death in 1913, the house was purchased by Henry and Minnie Bredthauer, who lived in the house for more than 50 years.

== See also ==
- National Register of Historic Places listings in Washington County, Texas
