= Burton Farmers Gin =

- U.S. National Register of Historic Places
- Recorded Texas Historic Landmark
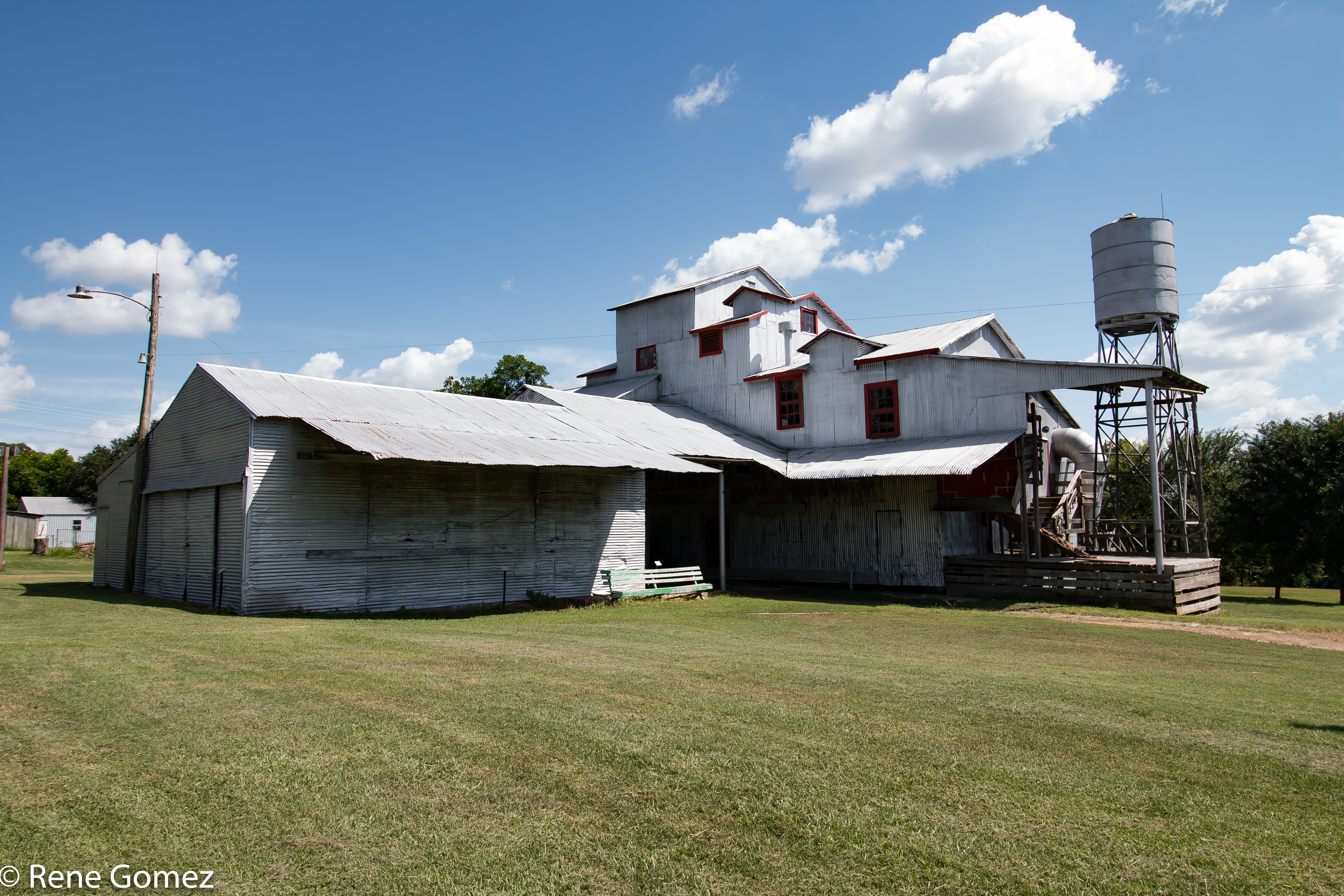
- Burton Farmers Gin in 2016

- Location within Texas Location within the United States
- Location: Main St. SE of Burton St., Burton, Texas
- Coordinates: 30°10′40″N 96°35′38″W
- Area: less than one acre
- Built: 1914
- Built by: Weeren Bros.
- MPS: Burton MPS
- NRHP reference No.: 91000712
- RTHL No.: 8317

Significant dates
- Added to NRHP: June 11, 1991
- Designated RTHL: 1988

The Burton Farmers Gin is a 2- and 3-story cotton gin house located close to the commercial district of Burton, Texas. It has also been known as Burton Farmers Gin Association's Site No. 3. It was listed on the National Register of Historic Places in 1991. It hosts the Texas Cotton Gin Museum. Besides the gin, the museum includes cotton warehouses and a shoe shop.

There were 4300 gins in Texas in 1912, according to a Texas Almanac. In the early 20th century, small towns in Washington County, Texas reportedly could support one or two gins. Location next to a railroad or close to cotton production was essential. Burton Farmers Gin was one of four gins that operated in Burton; two ceased operations by the 1910s and the Bauer Gin operated until 1948; these others are all gone. This gin was established by a group of farmers who formed the Burton Farmers Gin Association in 1913. Built in 1914, the gin has gone through numerous alteration and additions. The gin has a 125-HP Bessemer engine, which replaced the original steam engine in 1926. The gin ceased operations in 1974 but its equipment remained in place, and it was in "magnificent" condition. As of 1991, the only other surviving gin was a brick ginhouse in Brenham, Texas.

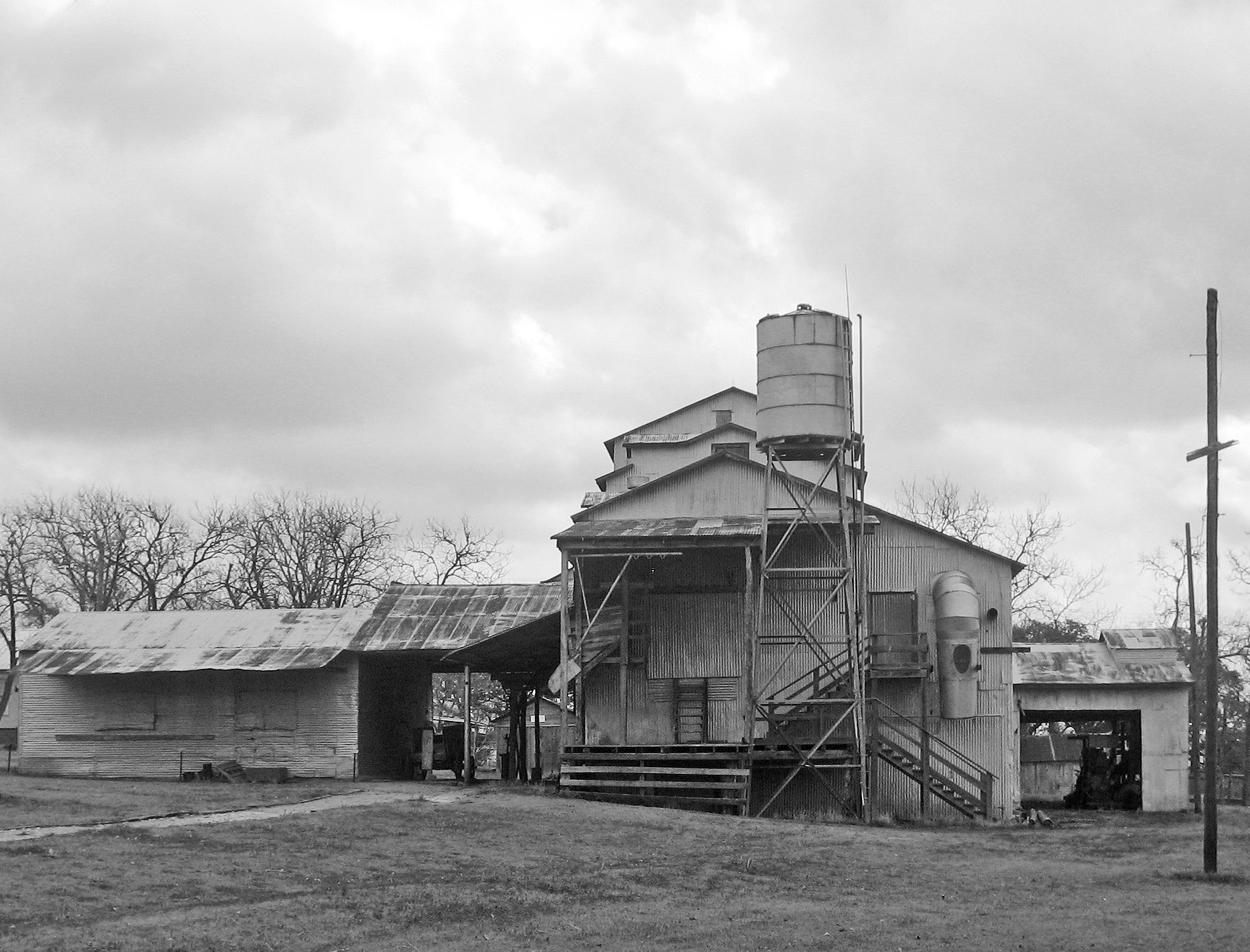

== See also ==
- Texas Cotton Gin Museum
- National Register of Historic Places listings in Washington County, Texas
- Recorded Texas Historic Landmarks in Washington County
