= National Register of Historic Places listings in Washington County, Texas =

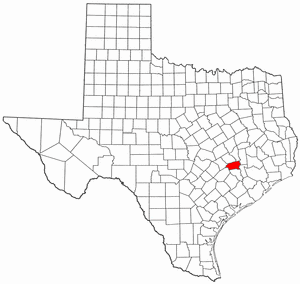
Location of Washington County in Texas

This is a list of the National Register of Historic Places listings in Washington County, Texas.

This is intended to be a complete list of properties and districts listed on the National Register of Historic Places in Washington County, Texas. There are six districts and 64 individual properties listed on the National Register in the county. Twenty-seven individually listed properties are Recorded Texas Historic Landmarks while five districts contain many more.

This National Park Service list is complete through NPS recent listings posted May 29, 2026.

== Current listings ==
The locations of National Register properties and districts may be seen in a Google mapping service provided.

	Name on the Register	Image	Date listed	Location	City or town	Description
1	Allcorn-Kokemoor Farmstead		August 6, 1998 (#98001015)	Independence Rd., 5 mi (8.0 km). north of Brenham; 30°13′22″N 96°22′51″W	Brenham vicinity	Recorded Texas Historic Landmark
2	Isaac Applewhite House	Isaac Applewhite House	February 20, 1985 (#85000342)	Church St. 30°08′35″N 96°15′09″W	Chappell Hill	Recorded Texas Historic Landmark; Historic Resources of Chappell Hill MRA
3	Bassett and Bassett Banking House	Bassett and Bassett Banking House	April 21, 1983 (#83003168)	222 E. Main St. 30°10′03″N 96°23′46″W	Brenham	Recorded Texas Historic Landmark, part of Brenham Downtown Historic District
4	Baylor University Female Department		August 12, 2024 (#100006856)	8415 Old Baylor College Rd. 30°19′09″N 96°21′15″W	Independence	
5	Baylor University Male Department	Baylor University Male Department	January 11, 2024 (#100006857)	10060 Sam Houston Rd. 30°18′58″N 96°20′48″W	Independence	
6	Becker-Hildebrandt House	Becker-Hildebrandt House	March 29, 1990 (#90000456)	1402 S. Church; 30°09′22″N 96°23′46″W	Brenham	Historic and Architectural Resources of Brenham MPS
7	Blinn College	Blinn College	March 29, 1990 (#90000446)	Roughly bounded by Third, Jackson, Fifth, Green, College, and High; 30°09′34″N 96°24′15″W	Brenham	Historic district encompasses the historic core of Blinn College and the neighboring residential area. Includes Recorded Texas Historic Landmarks; Historic and Architectural Resources of Brenham MPS.
8	Blue Bell Creameries Complex	Blue Bell Creameries Complex	March 29, 1990 (#90000468)	602 Creamery; 30°09′59″N 96°23′24″W	Brenham	Historic and Architectural Resources of Brenham MPS
9	Brenham Downtown Historic District	Brenham Downtown Historic District	March 10, 2004 (#04000154)	Roughly bounded W. Vulcan, E. Vulcan, South Market, West First, Bassett, S. Austin and N. Austin; 30°10′00″N 96°23′49″W	Brenham	Includes Recorded Texas Historic Landmarks; Historic and Architectural Resources of Brenham MPS
10	Brenham High School	Brenham High School	March 29, 1990 (#90000466)	1301 S. Market; 30°09′32″N 96°23′36″W	Brenham	Historic and Architectural Resources of Brenham MPS
11	Brenham High School Gymnasium	Brenham High School Gymnasium	March 29, 1990 (#90000467)	1301 S. Market; 30°09′34″N 96°23′33″W	Brenham	Historic and Architectural Resources of Brenham MPS
12	Brenham Normal and Industrial College		January 12, 2026 (#100012533)	1502 Mount Olive Street; 30°10′31″N 96°23′12″W	Brenham	
13	Brenham School	Brenham School	March 29, 1990 (#90000454)	600 E. Alamo; 30°10′02″N 96°23′36″W	Brenham	Recorded Texas Historic Landmark; Historic and Architectural Resources of Brenham MPS
14	Brenham Water Works	Brenham Water Works	March 29, 1990 (#90000465)	1105 S. Austin; 30°09′31″N 96°23′51″W	Brenham	Historic and Architectural Resources of Brenham MPS
15	Brockschmidt-Miller House	Brockschmidt-Miller House	March 29, 1990 (#90000451)	806 S. Day; 30°09′38″N 96°24′01″W	Brenham	Historic and Architectural Resources of Brenham MPS
16	John M. Brown House	John M. Brown House	April 16, 1975 (#75002010)	South of Washington on FM 912; 30°18′37″N 96°10′01″W	Washington	
17	W. W. Browning House	W. W. Browning House	January 20, 1972 (#72001376)	South of Chappell Hill near the junction of U.S. 290 and FM 1155; 30°07′34″N 96°15′27″W	Chappell Hill	Recorded Texas Historic Landmark
18	Burton Commercial Historic District	Burton Commercial Historic District	June 11, 1991 (#91000709)	Roughly bounded by Railroad, Live Oak, Brazos and Burton, including area south of Railroad between Washington and Texas Sts. 30°10′54″N 96°35′45″W	Burton	Includes Recorded Texas Historic Landmarks; Historic and Architectural Resources of Burton MPS
19	Burton Farmers Gin	Burton Farmers Gin	June 11, 1991 (#91000712)	Main St. southeast of Burton St. 30°10′40″N 96°35′38″W	Burton	Recorded Texas Historic Landmark; Historic and Architectural Resources of Burton MPS
20	Burton High School	Burton High School	June 11, 1991 (#91000711)	Junction of Main St. and FM 390; 30°11′02″N 96°35′53″W	Burton	Recorded Texas Historic Landmark; Historic and Architectural Resources of Burton MPS
21	Chappell Hill Circulating Library	Chappell Hill Circulating Library	February 20, 1985 (#85000343)	Cedar St. 30°08′32″N 96°15′19″W	Chappell Hill	Historic Resources of Chappell Hill MRA
22	Chappell Hill Methodist Episcopal Church	Chappell Hill Methodist Episcopal Church	February 20, 1985 (#85000344)	Church St. 30°08′29″N 96°15′09″W	Chappell Hill	Recorded Texas Historic Landmark; Historic Resources of Chappell Hill MRA
23	Chappell Hill Public School and Chappell Hill Female College Bell	Chappell Hill Public School and Chappell Hill Female College Bell	February 20, 1985 (#85000345)	Poplar St. 30°08′27″N 96°15′10″W	Chappell Hill	Historic Resources of Chappell Hill MRA
24	East Brenham	East Brenham	March 29, 1990 (#90000445)	Roughly bounded by Crockett, Embrey, E. Academy, Ross, E. Main, Market, Sycamore, Cottonwood, Botts, McIntyre, and Alma; 30°10′15″N 96°23′37″W	Brenham	Includes Recorded Texas Historic Landmarks; Historic and Architectural Resources of Brenham MPS
25	E. King Felder House	E. King Felder House	February 20, 1985 (#85000346)	Haller st. 30°08′28″N 96°15′50″W	Chappell Hill	Historic Resources of Chappell Hill MRA
26	Gantt-Jones House	Gantt-Jones House	November 16, 1979 (#79003022)	1.5 mi (2.4 km). northwest of Burton off SR 1697; 30°12′19″N 96°37′04″W	Burton	Recorded Texas Historic Landmark
27	Giddings-Stone Mansion	Giddings-Stone Mansion	June 24, 1976 (#76002080)	204 E. Stone St. 30°08′57″N 96°23′31″W	Brenham	Recorded Texas Historic Landmark
28	Giddings-Wilkin House	Giddings-Wilkin House	December 12, 1976 (#76002081)	805 Crocket St. 30°10′25″N 96°23′29″W	Brenham	Recorded Texas Historic Landmark
29	Hatfield Plantation		January 25, 1971 (#71000971)	Northwest of Brenham off FM 912; 30°18′28″N 96°10′34″W	Brenham vicinity	Recorded Texas Historic Landmark
30	Hodde Drugstore	Hodde Drugstore	June 11, 1991 (#91000713)	Main St. southeast of Burton St. 30°10′50″N 96°35′36″W	Burton	Historic and Architectural Resources of Burton MPS
31	Edmund Holle House	Edmund Holle House	March 29, 1990 (#90000458)	1002 S. Day; 30°09′32″N 96°24′00″W	Brenham	Historic and Architectural Resources of Brenham MPS
32	Mrs. Sam Houston House	Mrs. Sam Houston House	October 22, 1970 (#70000775)	FM 390, 1 block east of the junction with FM 50; 30°19′08″N 96°20′41″W	Independence	Recorded Texas Historic Landmark
33	Asa Hoxey House	Asa Hoxey House	June 29, 1976 (#76002083)	West of Independence; 30°19′12″N 96°21′59″W	Independence	
34	Kneip-Bredthauer House	Kneip-Bredthauer House	June 11, 1991 (#91000719)	SE corner of Colorado and Cedar; 30°11′06″N 96°35′46″W	Burton	Historic and Architectural Resources of Burton MPS
35	Dr. Charles Laas House	Dr. Charles Laas House	June 11, 1991 (#91000717)	NE corner of Live Oak and Colorado Sts. 30°11′04″N 96°35′44″W	Burton	Historic and Architectural Resources of Burton MPS
36	Dr. Robert Lenert House	Dr. Robert Lenert House	March 29, 1990 (#90000457)	602 S. Market; 30°09′48″N 96°23′43″W	Brenham	Historic and Architectural Resources of Brenham MPS
37	Main Building, Blinn College	Main Building, Blinn College	December 6, 1978 (#78002998)	804 College Ave. 30°09′34″N 96°24′18″W	Brenham	Recorded Texas Historic Landmark, part of Blinn College historic district
38	Main Street Historic District	Main Street Historic District	May 15, 1985 (#85001175)	Main St. 30°08′35″N 96°15′25″W	Chappell Hill	Includes Recorded Texas Historic Landmarks; Historic Resources of Chappell Hill MRA
39	Edgar Matchett House	Edgar Matchett House	March 29, 1990 (#90000462)	502 W. Main; 30°09′59″N 96°24′13″W	Brenham	Historic and Architectural Resources of Brenham MPS
40	Mt. Zion Methodist Church	Mt. Zion Methodist Church	March 29, 1990 (#90000450)	500 High; 30°09′43″N 96°24′25″W	Brenham	Historic and Architectural Resources of Brenham MPS
41	William Neumann House	William Neumann House	June 18, 1991 (#91000710)	Navasota St. west of Washington St. 30°10′40″N 96°36′11″W	Burton	Historic and Architectural Resources of Burton MPS
42	Herbert Nienstedt House	Herbert Nienstedt House	June 11, 1991 (#91000718)	NE corner of Brazos and Washington Sts. 30°10′59″N 96°35′43″W	Burton	Historic and Architectural Resources of Burton MPS
43	William Nienstedt House	William Nienstedt House	June 11, 1991 (#91000715)	SE corner of Brazos and Texas Sts. 30°10′56″N 96°35′39″W	Burton	Historic and Architectural Resources of Burton MPS
44	Pampell-Day House	Pampell-Day House	October 15, 1970 (#70000774)	409 W. Alamo St. 30°09′56″N 96°24′10″W	Brenham	Recorded Texas Historic Landmark
45	Red House		January 25, 1971 (#71000972)	Northeast of Gay Hill via TX 36 and FM 390; 30°16′55″N 96°27′27″W	Gay Hill	Recorded Texas Historic Landmark
46	Reichardt-Low House	Reichardt-Low House	March 29, 1990 (#90000455)	609 S. Austin; 30°09′45″N 96°23′54″W	Brenham	Historic and Architectural Resources of Brenham MPS
47	Reue-Eickenhorst House	Reue-Eickenhorst House	April 27, 1995 (#95000519)	FM Hwy. 2621, 0.5 mi (0.80 km). east of junction with TX 50; 30°15′03″N 96°21′20″W	Brenham	Recorded Texas Historic Landmark
48	William S. Rogers House	William S. Rogers House	February 20, 1985 (#85000347)	Cedar St. 30°08′32″N 96°15′21″W	Chappell Hill	Historic Resources of Chappell Hill MRA
49	J. R. Routt House	J. R. Routt House	February 20, 1985 (#85000348)	Chestnut St. 30°08′36″N 96°15′10″W	Chappell Hill	Historic Resources of Chappell Hill MRA
50	William Edward Sanders House	William Edward Sanders House	June 11, 1991 (#91000716)	Railroad St. southeast of US 290; 30°10′35″N 96°35′28″W	Burton	Historic and Architectural Resources of Burton MPS
51	Santa Fe Railway Company Freight Depot	Santa Fe Railway Company Freight Depot	March 29, 1990 (#90000459)	214 S. Austin; 30°09′55″N 96°24′00″W	Brenham	Part of Brenham Downtown Historic District; Historic and Architectural Resources of Brenham MPS
52	Almot Schlenker House	Almot Schlenker House	March 29, 1990 (#90000461)	405 College; 30°09′36″N 96°24′03″W	Brenham	Historic and Architectural Resources of Brenham MPS
53	Schlenker-Kolwes House	Schlenker-Kolwes House	March 29, 1990 (#90000460)	1304 S. Market; 30°09′26″N 96°23′37″W	Brenham	Historic and Architectural Resources of Brenham MPS
54	Schmidt House	Schmidt House	December 10, 1990 (#90001806)	906 W. 5th St. 30°09′28″N 96°24′23″W	Brenham	Historic and Architectural Resources of Brenham MPS
55	Fritz Paul and Emma Schroeder House	Fritz Paul and Emma Schroeder House	September 30, 1994 (#94001169)	Co. Rd. 68, north side, north of Brenham; 30°16′51″N 96°18′29″W	Brenham vicinity	Recorded Texas Historic Landmark
56	F. W. Schuerenberg House	F. W. Schuerenberg House	March 29, 1990 (#90000469)	503 W. Alamo; 30°09′55″N 96°24′12″W	Brenham	Recorded Texas Historic Landmark; Historic and Architectural Resources of Brenham MPS
57	R. A. Schuerenberg House	R. A. Schuerenberg House	March 29, 1990 (#90000463)	703 S. Market; 30°09′44″N 96°23′40″W	Brenham	Historic and Architectural Resources of Brenham MPS
58	W. E. Seelhorst House	W. E. Seelhorst House	March 29, 1990 (#90000470)	702 Seelhorst; 30°09′56″N 96°23′28″W	Brenham	Recorded Texas Historic Landmark; Historic and Architectural Resources of Brenham MPS
59	Seward Plantation	Seward Plantation	January 29, 2013 (#12001250)	10005 Farm to Market Road 390 E 30°19′46″N 96°19′56″W	Independence	
60	John Sterling Smith Jr. House	John Sterling Smith Jr. House	February 20, 1985 (#85000349)	Chestnut St. 30°08′35″N 96°15′12″W	Chappell Hill	Recorded Texas Historic Landmark; Historic Resources of Chappell Hill MRA
61	Southern Pacific Railroad Freight Depot	Southern Pacific Railroad Freight Depot	March 29, 1990 (#90000453)	306 S. Market; 30°09′57″N 96°23′46″W	Brenham	Recorded Texas Historic Landmark, part of Brenham Downtown Historic District; Historic and Architectural Resources of Brenham MPS
62	St. Mary's Catholic Church	St. Mary's Catholic Church	March 29, 1990 (#90000452)	701 Church; 30°09′42″N 96°23′49″W	Brenham	Historic and Architectural Resources of Brenham MPS
63	Stage Coach Inn	Stage Coach Inn	December 12, 1976 (#76002082)	4950 Main St. 30°08′36″N 96°15′26″W	Chappell Hill	Part of Main Street Historic District; exceptional-quality 14-room, 1850 inn is also the oldest building in Chappell Hill. Known as Hargrove House when it served as a boarding house for college students, during the antebellum period it was an important stagecoach and telegraph office on the routes between Houston & Austin and Houston & Waco. Restored in the 1970s and operated as a bed and breakfast for many years.
64	Synagogue B'nai Abraham	Synagogue B'nai Abraham	March 29, 1990 (#90000464)	302 N. Park; 30°10′05″N 96°23′53″W	Brenham	Recorded Texas Historic Landmark; Historic and Architectural Resources of Brenham MPS
65	US Post Office-Federal Building-Brenham	US Post Office-Federal Building-Brenham	March 29, 1990 (#90000449)	105 S. Market; 30°09′43″N 96°24′25″W	Brenham	Part of Brenham Downtown Historic District; Historic and Architectural Resources of Brenham MPS
66	James Walker Log House		August 21, 1989 (#89001143)	Co. Rd. 80; 30°10′24″N 96°20′03″W	Brenham vicinity	Recorded Texas Historic Landmark
67	Washington County Courthouse	Washington County Courthouse	March 29, 1990 (#90000447)	110 E. Main; 30°10′01″N 96°23′51″W	Brenham	Recorded Texas Historic Landmark, part of Brenham Downtown Historic District; Historic and Architectural Resources of Brenham MPS
68	Waverly	Waverly	April 14, 1983 (#83003169)	FR 2447; 30°08′42″N 96°15′03″W	Chappell Hill	Recorded Texas Historic Landmark
69	Wehring Shoe Shop and Residence	Wehring Shoe Shop and Residence	June 11, 1991 (#91000714)	Main St. southeast of Burton St. 30°10′47″N 96°35′36″W	Burton	Historic and Architectural Resources of Burton MPS
70	Wood-Hughes House	Wood-Hughes House	March 29, 1990 (#90000448)	614 S. Austin; 30°09′43″N 96°23′56″W	Brenham	Recorded Texas Historic Landmark; Historic and Architectural Resources of Brenham MPS

== See also ==
- National Register of Historic Places listings in Texas
- Recorded Texas Historic Landmarks in Washington County
