= J. R. Routt House =

Historic house in Texas, United States

- U.S. National Register of Historic Places
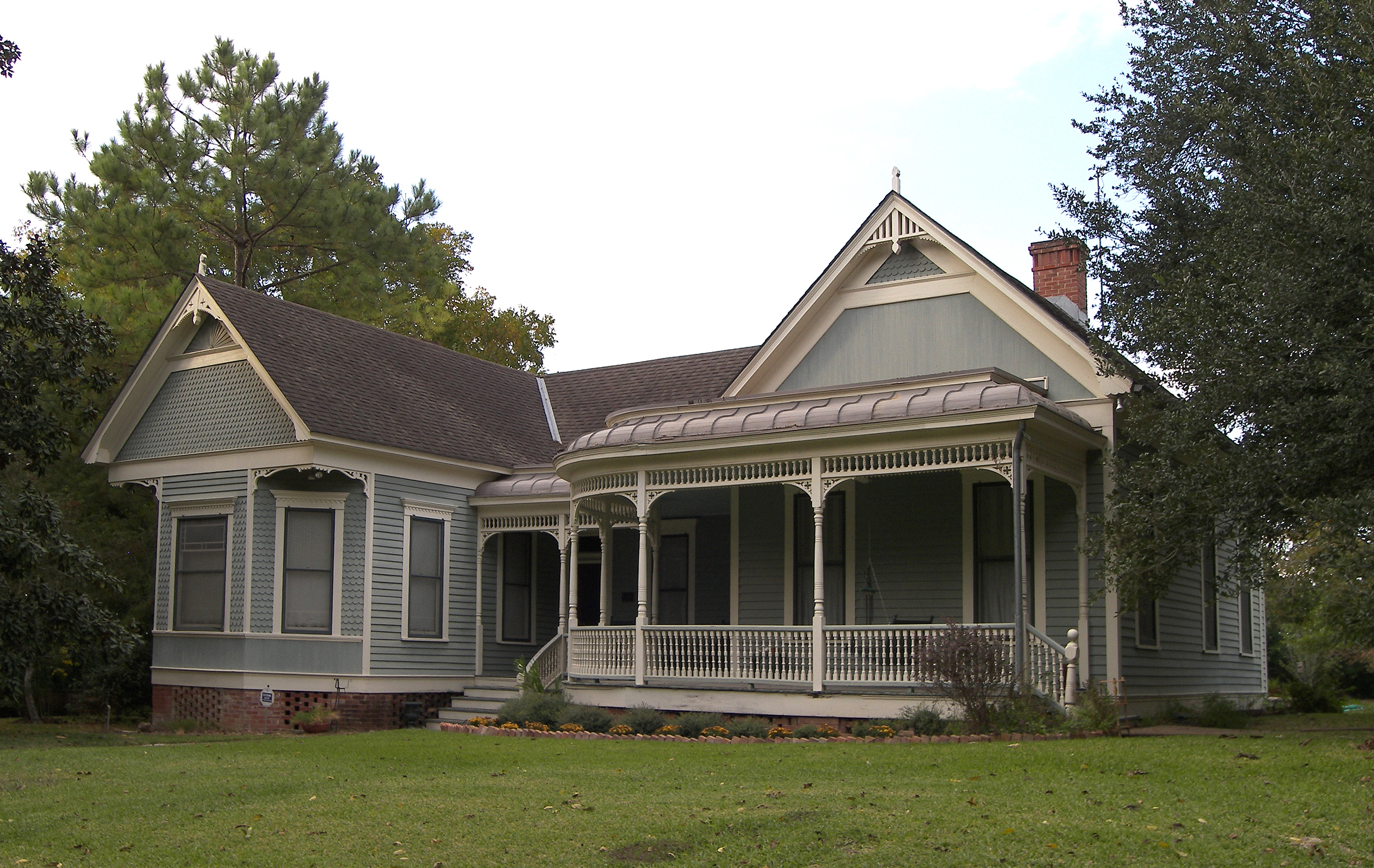
- Routt House in 2008

- Location within Texas Location within the United States
- Location: Chestnut St., Chappell Hill, Texas
- Coordinates: 30°08′35″N 96°15′11″W
- Area: 1.2 acres (0.49 ha)
- Built: 1898
- Architect: J. W. Heartfield
- Architectural style: Late Victorian
- MPS: Chappell Hill MRA
- NRHP reference No.: 85000348
- Added to NRHP: February 20, 1985

J. R. Routt House (commonly known as Routt–Crockett House) is an historic dwelling of local significance in Chappell Hill, Texas, United States. It was added to the National Register of Historic Places on February 20, 1985.

== History ==
The house was originally built in the 1850s by Marcus P. Munyan (who constructed various buildings in the area) as a four-room house. In 1866 it was sold to J. N. Thompsons, who sold it to J. R. Routt in 1898. Routt made significant changes to the plot, contracting J. W. Heartfield to move the cottage to the rear of the plot and build it in to a much larger Late Victorian house. The house has had various modifications since and has been kept in good repair. The current plot is believed to be worthy of archaeological investigation to find out more about the original outbuildings. It is also thought that there may have been a cistern associated with the dwelling historically. The home was inherited by Routt's daughter Thelma Crockett in 1962.

== See also ==
- National Register of Historic Places listings in Washington County, Texas
