= Hatfield Plantation =

Historic house in Texas, United States

- U.S. National Register of Historic Places
- Recorded Texas Historic Landmark
- Location within Texas Location within the United States
- Nearest city: Brenham, Texas
- Coordinates: 30°18′24″N 96°10′51″W
- Area: 2 acres (0.81 ha)
- Built: 1853
- NRHP reference No.: 71000971
- RTHL No.: 15309

Significant dates
- Added to NRHP: January 25, 1971
- Designated RTHL: 1966

The Hatfield Plantation is a plantation complex in Washington County, Texas near Brenham. The National Register of Historic Places has listed it since January 25, 1971.

== See also ==
- National Register of Historic Places listings in Washington County, Texas
- Recorded Texas Historic Landmarks in Washington County
