= East Brenham =

- East Brenham Historic District
- U.S. National Register of Historic Places
- U.S. Historic district
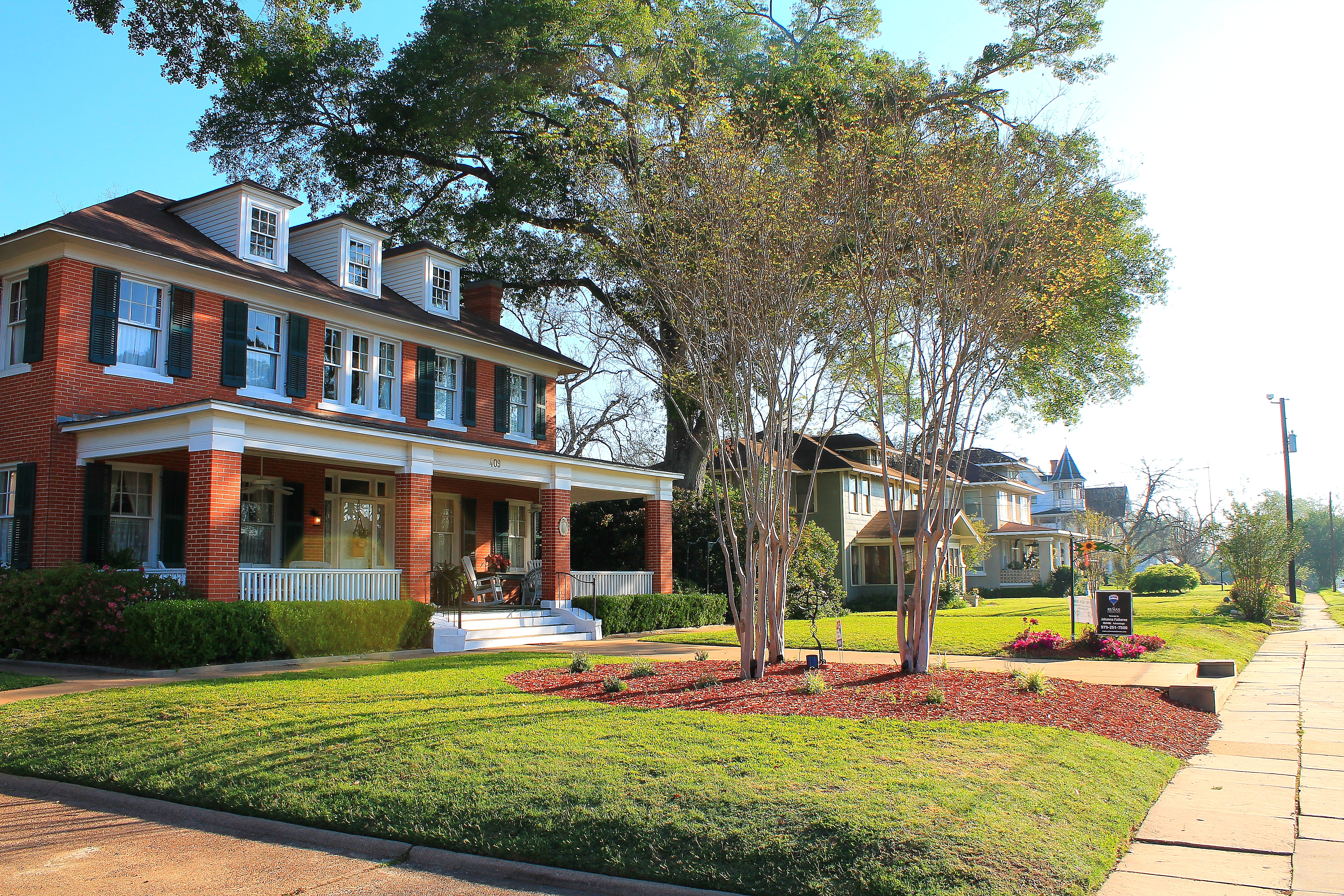
- House at 409 E. Main St. in 2012

- Location within Texas Location within the United States
- Location: Roughly bounded by Crockett, Embrey, E. Academy, Ross, E. Main, Market, Sycamore, Cottonwood, Botts, McIntyre, and Alma, Brenham, Texas
- Coordinates: 30°10′15″N 96°23′37″W
- Area: 58 acres (23 ha)
- Built by: Alex Griffen
- Architect: Moses Ginn
- Architectural style: Late 19th And Early 20th Century American Movements, Late 19th And 20th Century Revivals
- MPS: Brenham MPS
- NRHP reference No.: 90000445
- Added to NRHP: March 29, 1990

East Brenham Historic District is residential area located northeast of downtown Brenham, Texas.

Comprising about nine city blocks, the district contains 79 contributing resources, primarily residential with some commercial buildings and a church. The oldest building is an 1881 house, most of the buildings date from about 1875 to 1940.

The district was added to the National Register of Historic Places on March 29, 1990 as an example of a cohesive residential neighborhood from the late 19th to early 20th centuries.

== Photo gallery ==
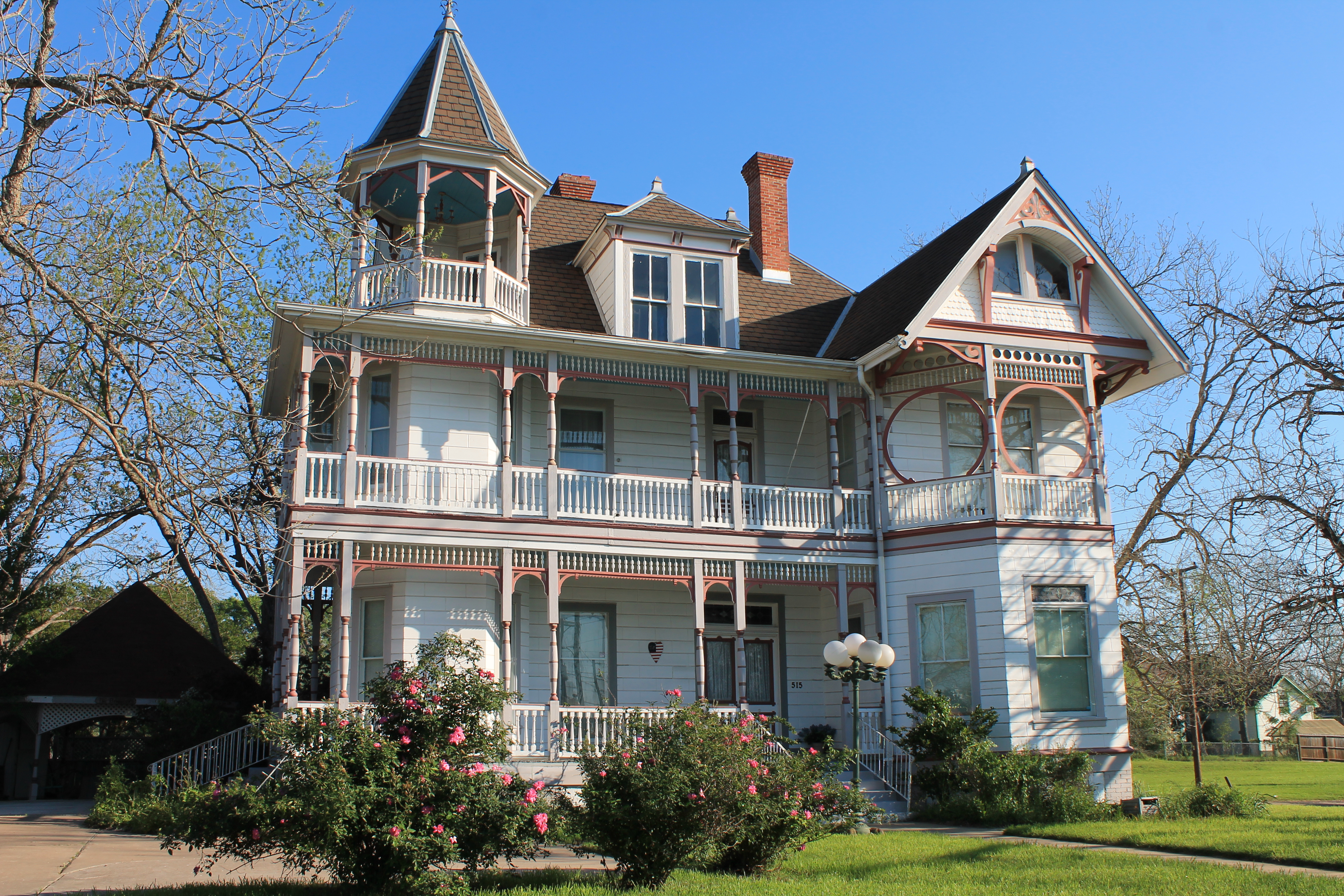

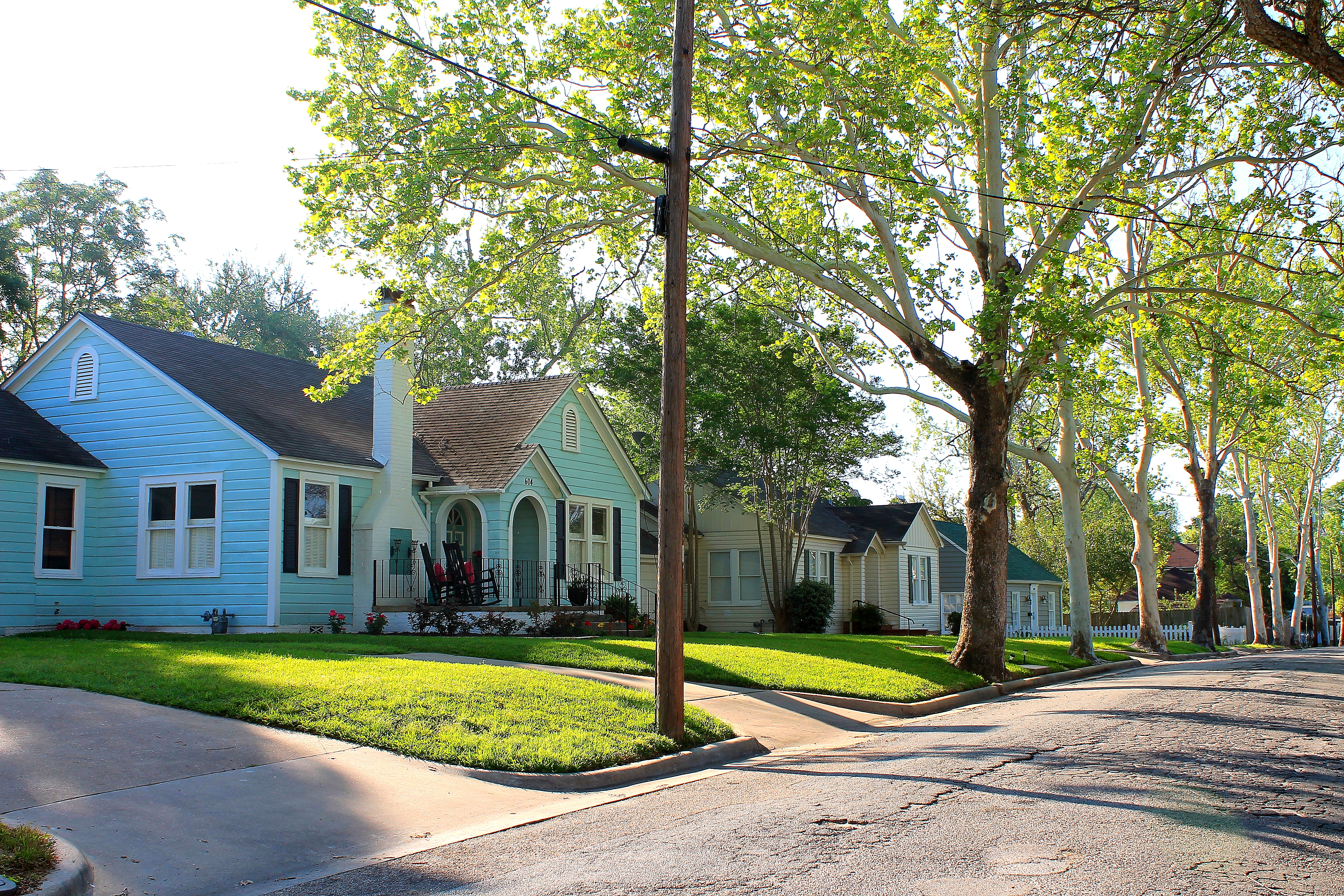

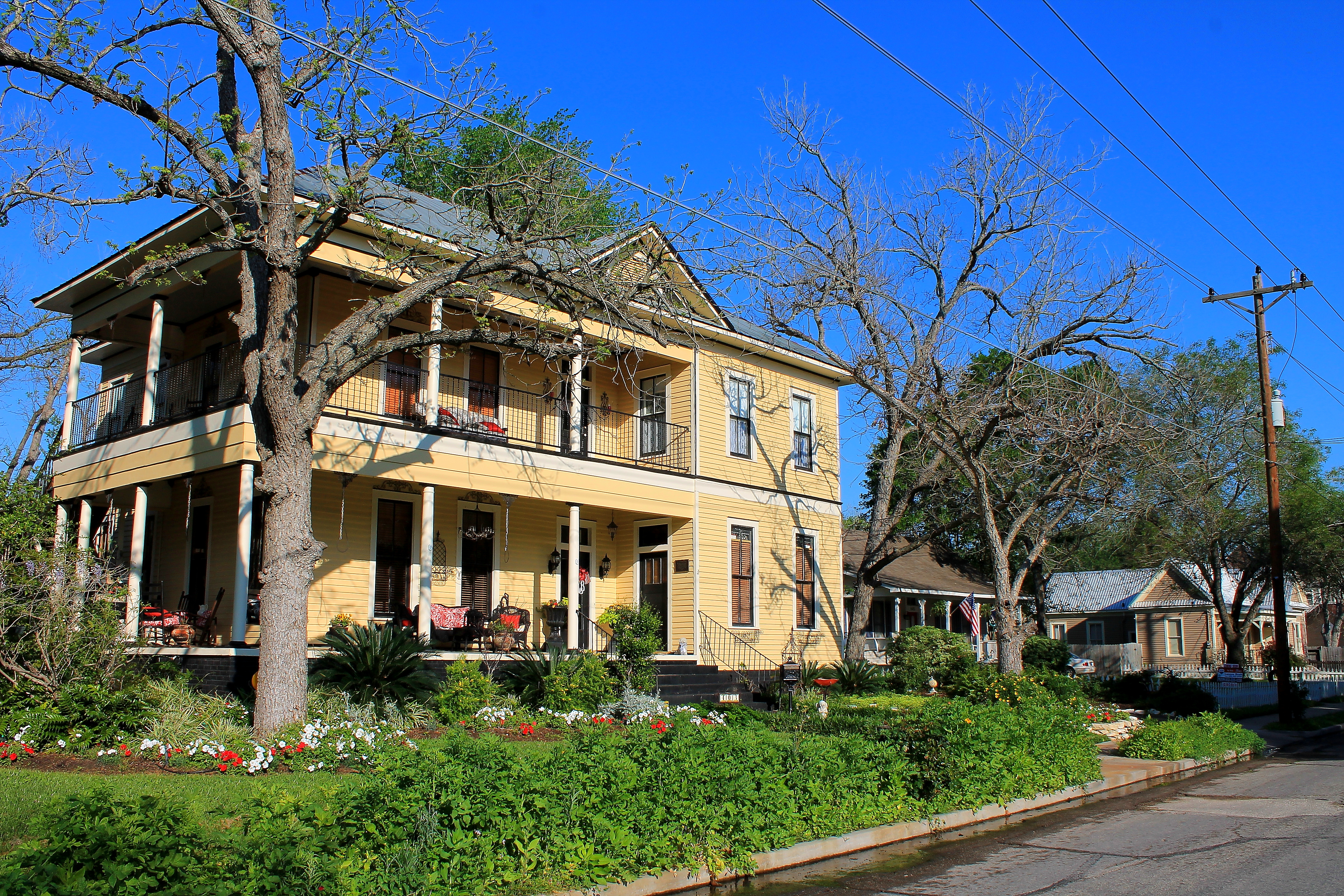

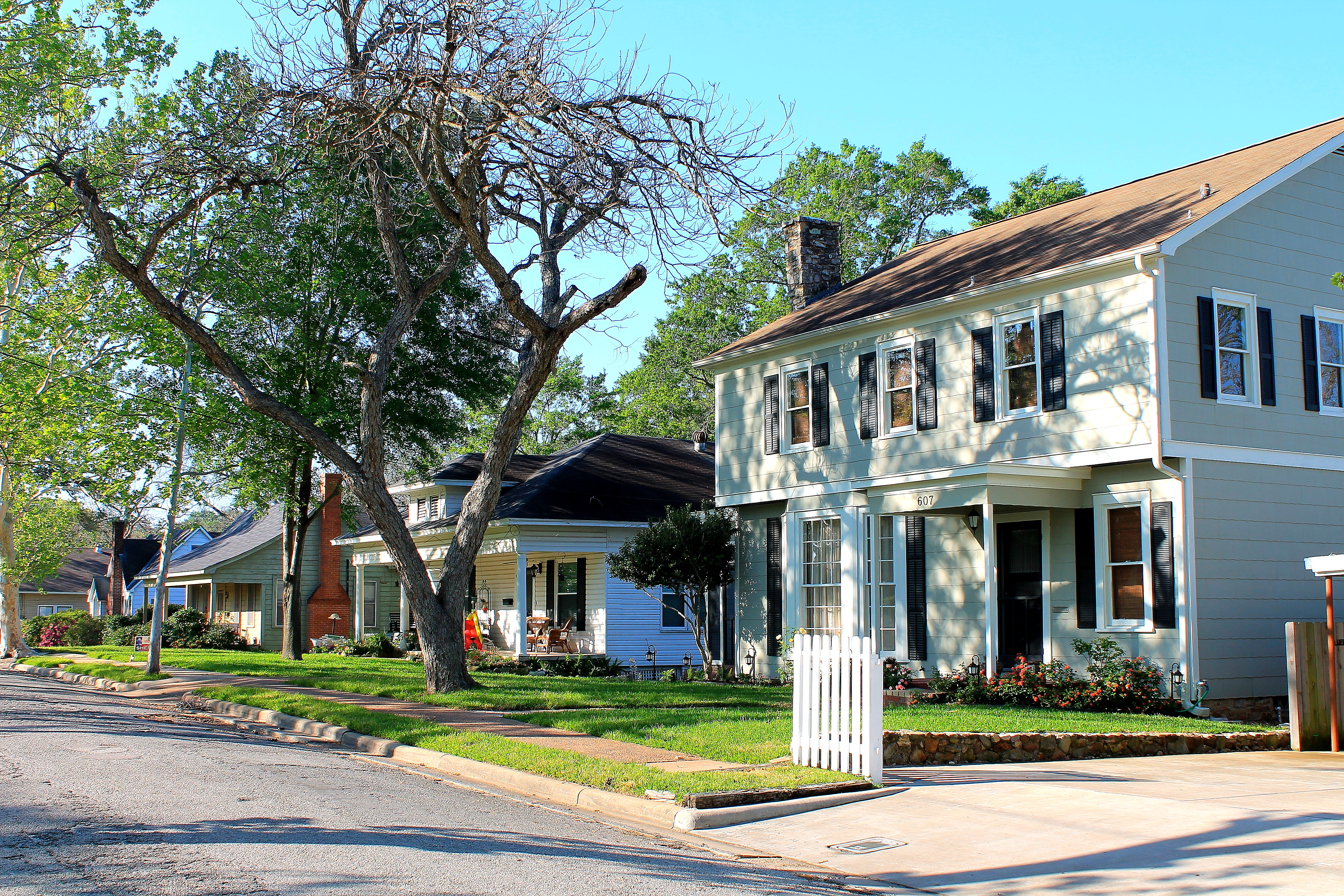

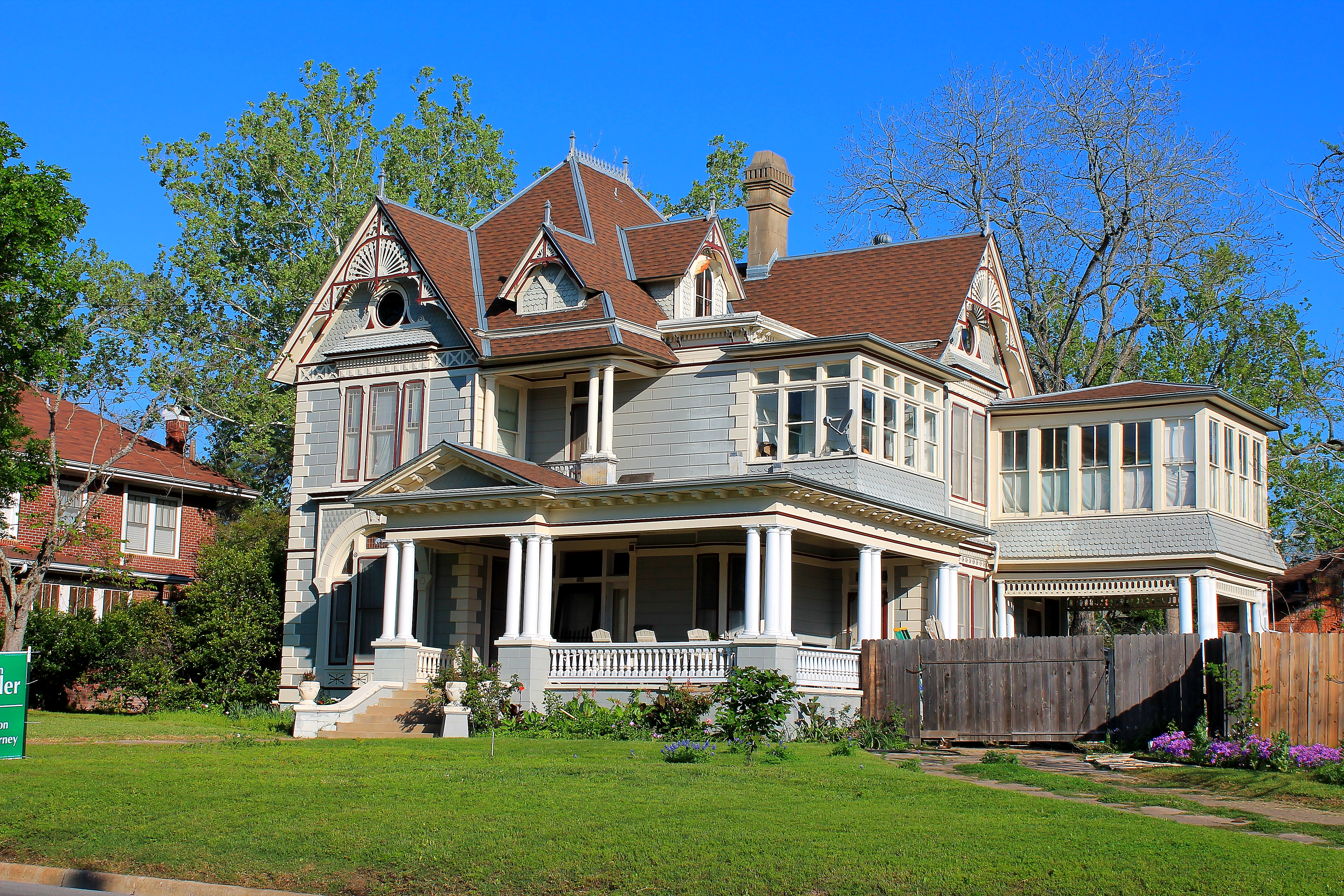

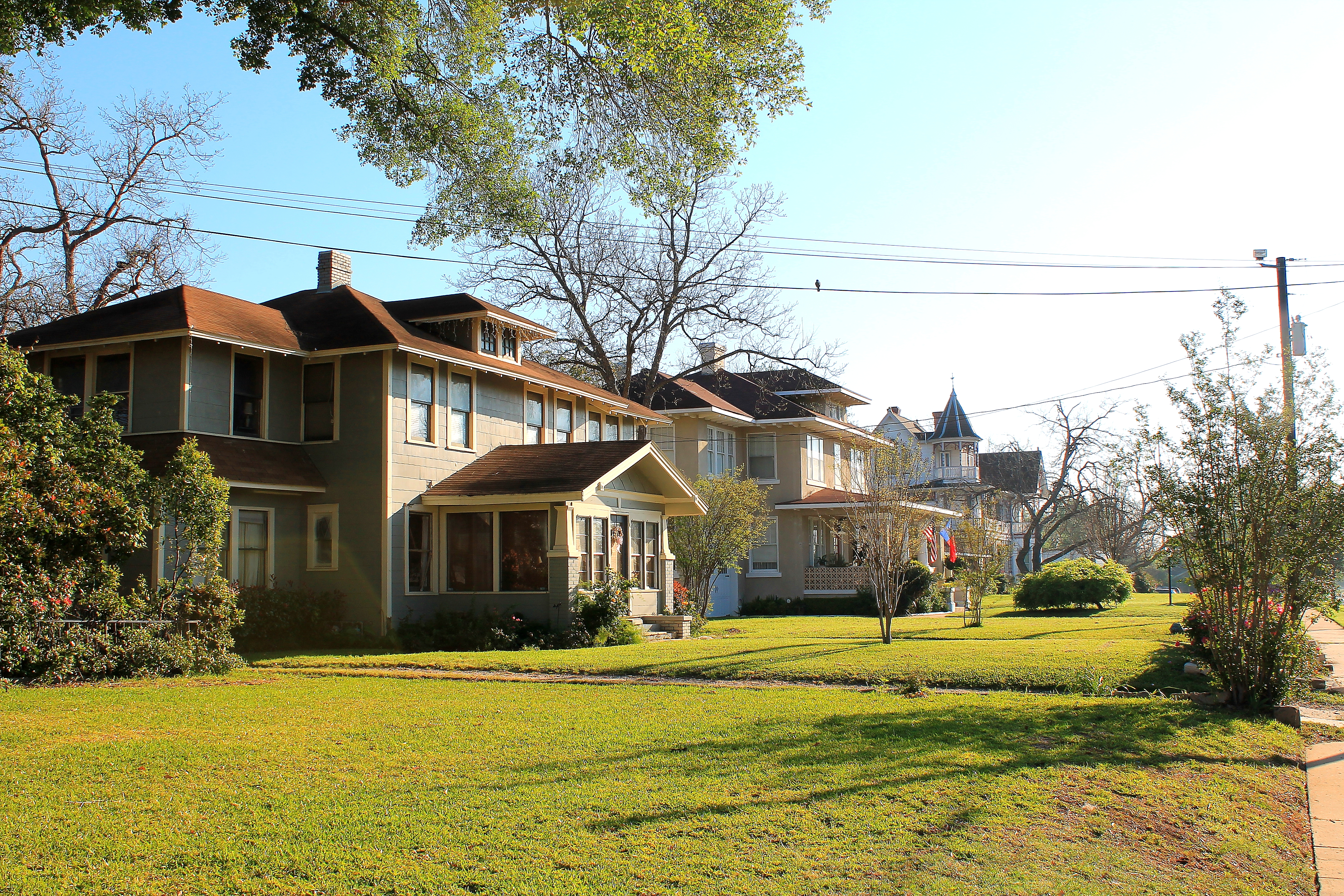

== See also ==
- National Register of Historic Places listings in Washington County, Texas
- Recorded Texas Historic Landmarks in Washington County
