= Mt. Zion Methodist Church (Brenham, Texas) =

Historic church in Texas, United States

- U.S. National Register of Historic Places
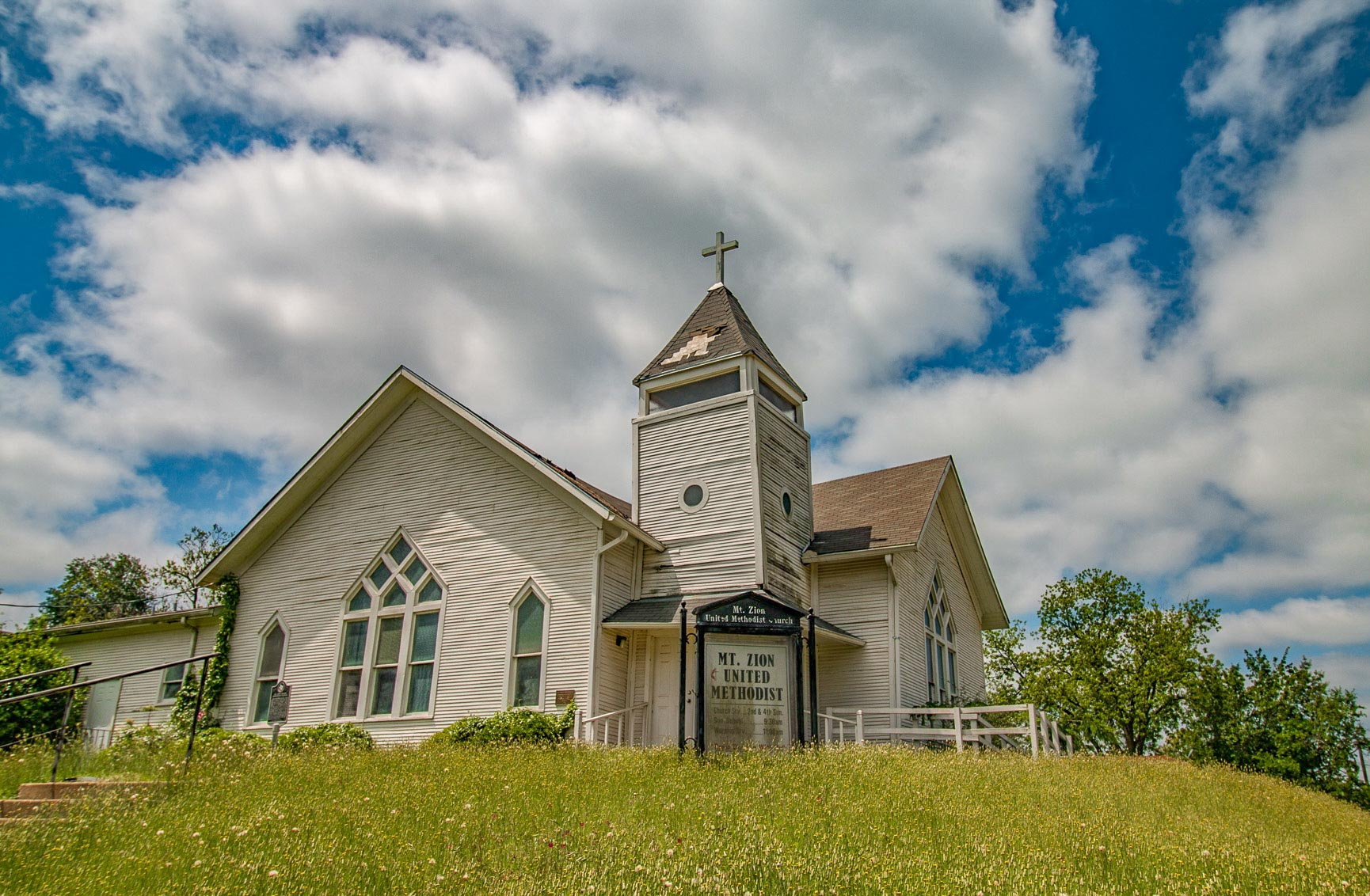
- Mt. Zion United Methodist Church

- Location within Texas Location within the United States
- Location: 500 High, Brenham, Texas
- Coordinates: 30°9′43″N 96°24′25″W
- Area: less than one acre
- Built: 1921
- Architect: J.C. Giddings
- Architectural style: Gothic Revival
- MPS: Brenham MPS
- NRHP reference No.: 90000450
- Added to NRHP: March 29, 1990

Mt. Zion Methodist Church is a historic United Methodist church building at 500 High Street in Brenham, Texas.

The Gothic Revival building was constructed in 1921 and added to the National Register of Historic Places in 1990.

== See also ==
- National Register of Historic Places listings in Washington County, Texas
