= Isaac Applewhite House =

Historic house in Texas, United States

- U.S. National Register of Historic Places
- Recorded Texas Historic Landmark
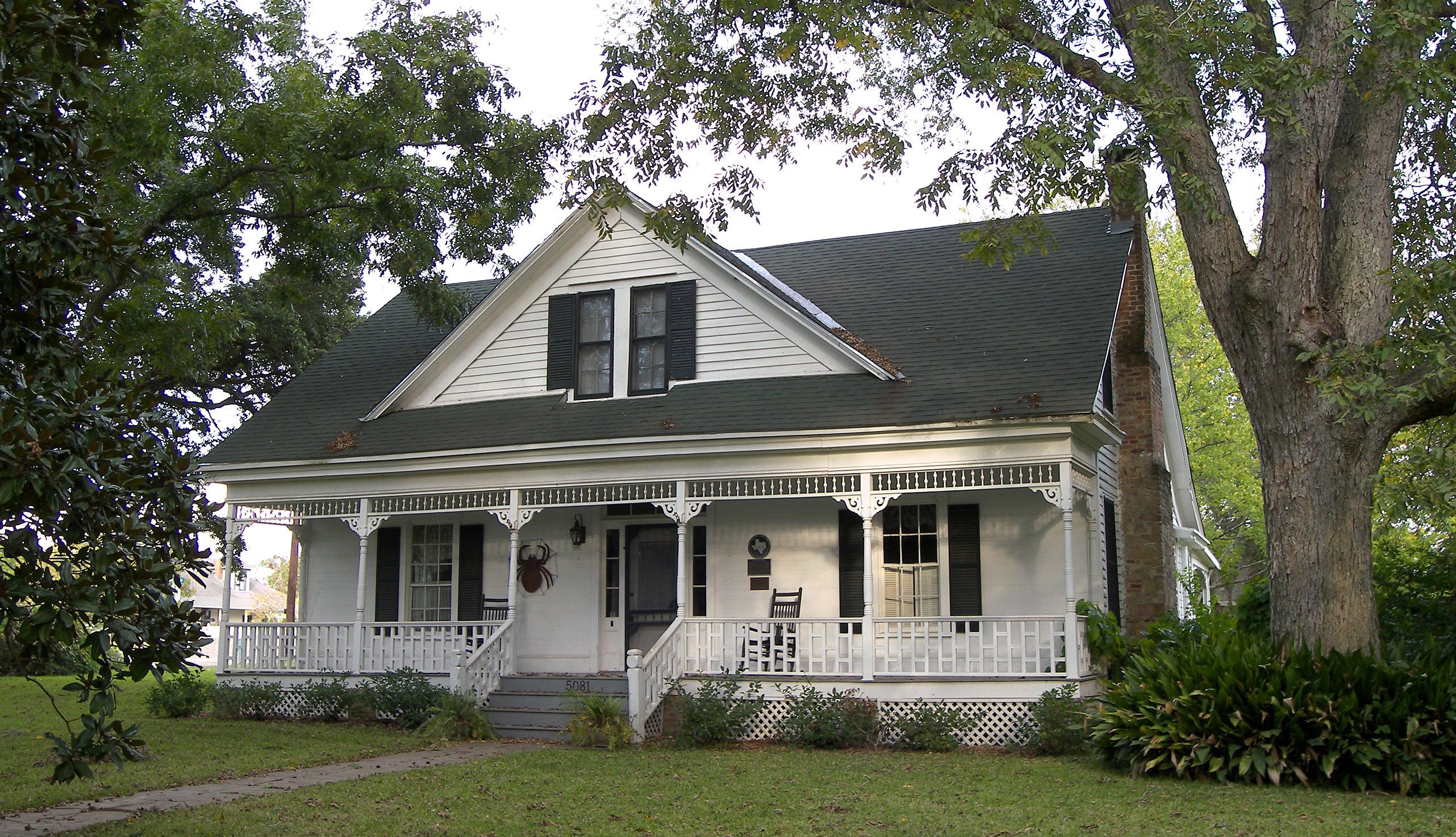
- Applewhite House in 2008

- Location within Texas Location within the United States
- Location: Church St., Chappell Hill, Texas
- Coordinates: 30°8′36″N 96°15′8″W
- Area: 1.5 acres (0.61 ha)
- Built: 1852
- MPS: Chappell Hill MRA
- NRHP reference No.: 85000342
- RTHL No.: 8289

Significant dates
- Added to NRHP: February 20, 1985
- Designated RTHL: 1968

Isaac Applewhite House is a historic house on Church Street in Chappell Hill, Texas.

It was built in 1852 and added to the National Register of Historic Places in 1985.

== See also ==
- National Register of Historic Places listings in Washington County, Texas
- Recorded Texas Historic Landmarks in Washington County
