= Giddings–Stone Mansion =

Historic house in Texas, United States

- U.S. National Register of Historic Places
- Recorded Texas Historic Landmark
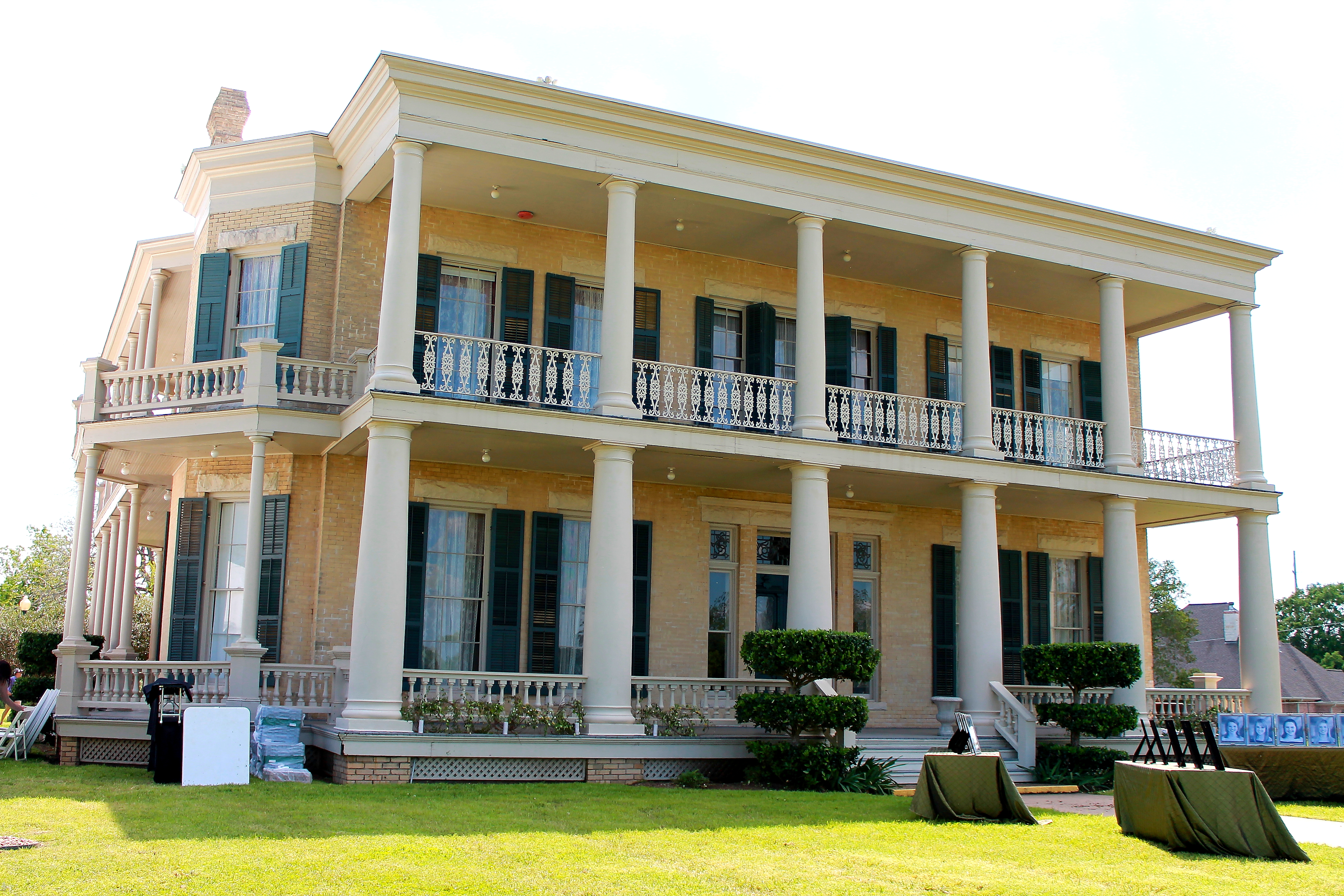
- Giddings–Stone Mansion in 2012

- Location within Texas Location within the United States
- Location: 204 E. Stone St., Brenham, Texas
- Coordinates: 30°09′56″N 96°24′54″W
- Area: 1 acre (0.40 ha)
- Built: 1870
- Architectural style: Greek Revival, Transitional
- NRHP reference No.: 76002080
- RTHL No.: 8339

Significant dates
- Added to NRHP: June 24, 1976
- Designated RTHL: 1991

The Giddings–Stone Mansion is a historic mansion located at 2203 Century Circle., Brenham, Texas. It was designed in the Greek Revival architectural style. It has been listed on the National Register of Historic Places since June 24, 1976.

The house was acquired by the Heritage Society of Washington County in 1975.

== See also ==
- National Register of Historic Places listings in Washington County, Texas
- Recorded Texas Historic Landmarks in Washington County
