= F. W. Schuerenberg House =

Historic house in Texas, United States

- U.S. National Register of Historic Places
- Recorded Texas Historic Landmark
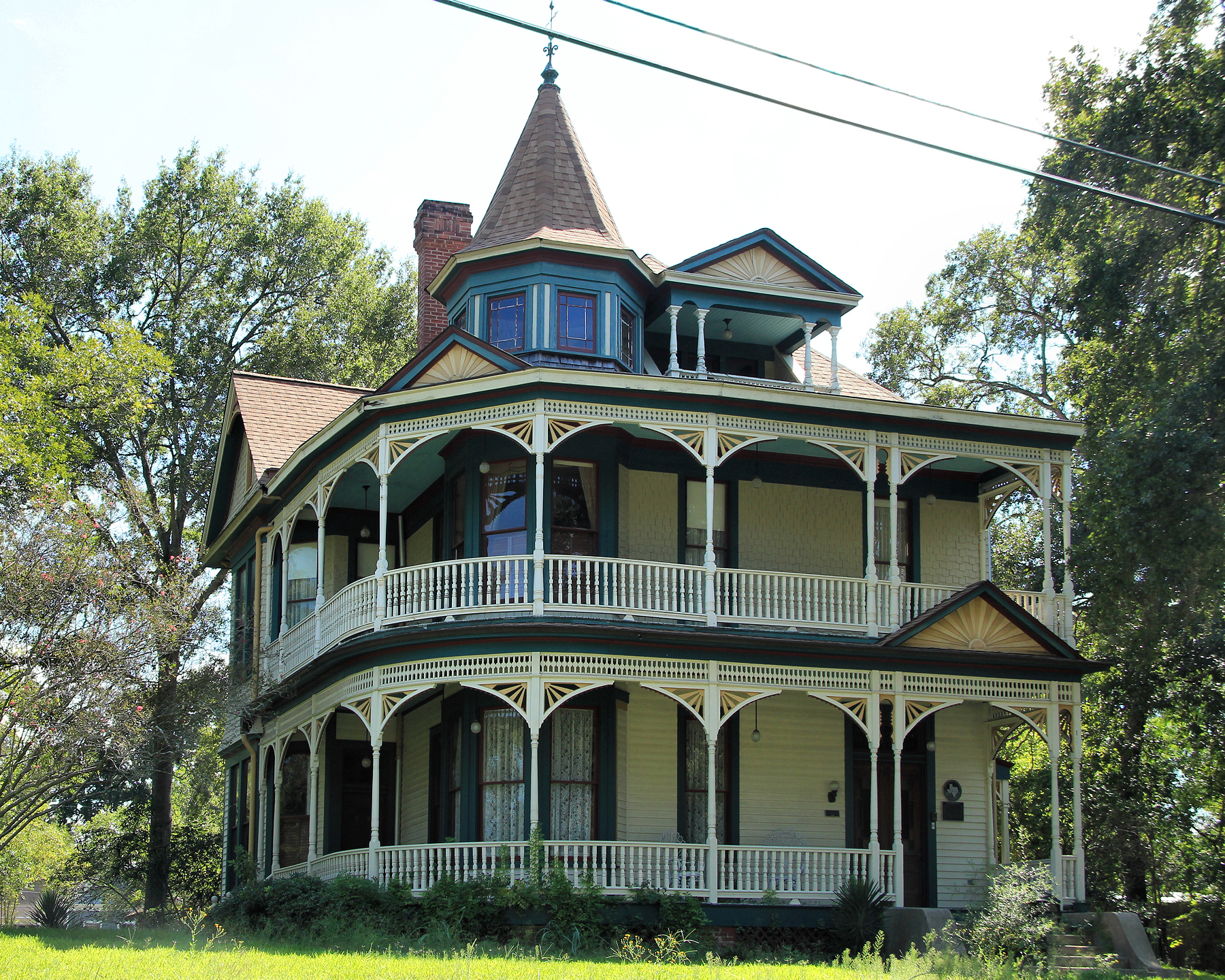
- F. W. Schuerenberg House in 2013

- Location within Texas Location within the United States
- Location: 503 W. Alamo, Brenham, Texas
- Coordinates: 30°9′55″N 96°24′10″W
- Area: less than one acre
- Built: 1895
- Architect: Alex Griffen
- Architectural style: Stick/Eastlake, Queen Anne
- MPS: Brenham MPS
- NRHP reference No.: 90000469
- RTHL No.: 8393

Significant dates
- Added to NRHP: March 29, 1990
- Designated RTHL: 1996

The F.W. Schuerenberg House is located in Brenham, Texas and was built in 1895 by Frederick William Schuerenberg. Schuerenberg, the son of an early German immigrant, was a local businessman who owned a blacksmith shop in Brenham. The mansion is located at 503 West Alamo street and is considered a classic example of Victorian architecture. The Mansion was listed on the National Register of Historic Places in 1990. It sat vacant from 2005 to early 2016, when it was then purchased by a married couple from Houston who plan to restore it. It is said to be haunted by the spirit of a small girl who occasionally peers out the first floor bay window. it is also rumored that someone committed suicide by hanging themselves in the nursery located on the second floor. The old carriage house is located at the back of the lot on Peabody street. Its architectural style closely resembles that of the Wood-Hughes House which is also located in Brenham, Texas.

== See also ==
- National Register of Historic Places listings in Washington County, Texas
- Recorded Texas Historic Landmarks in Washington County
