= Chappell Hill Public School and Chappell Hill Female College Bell =

- U.S. National Register of Historic Places
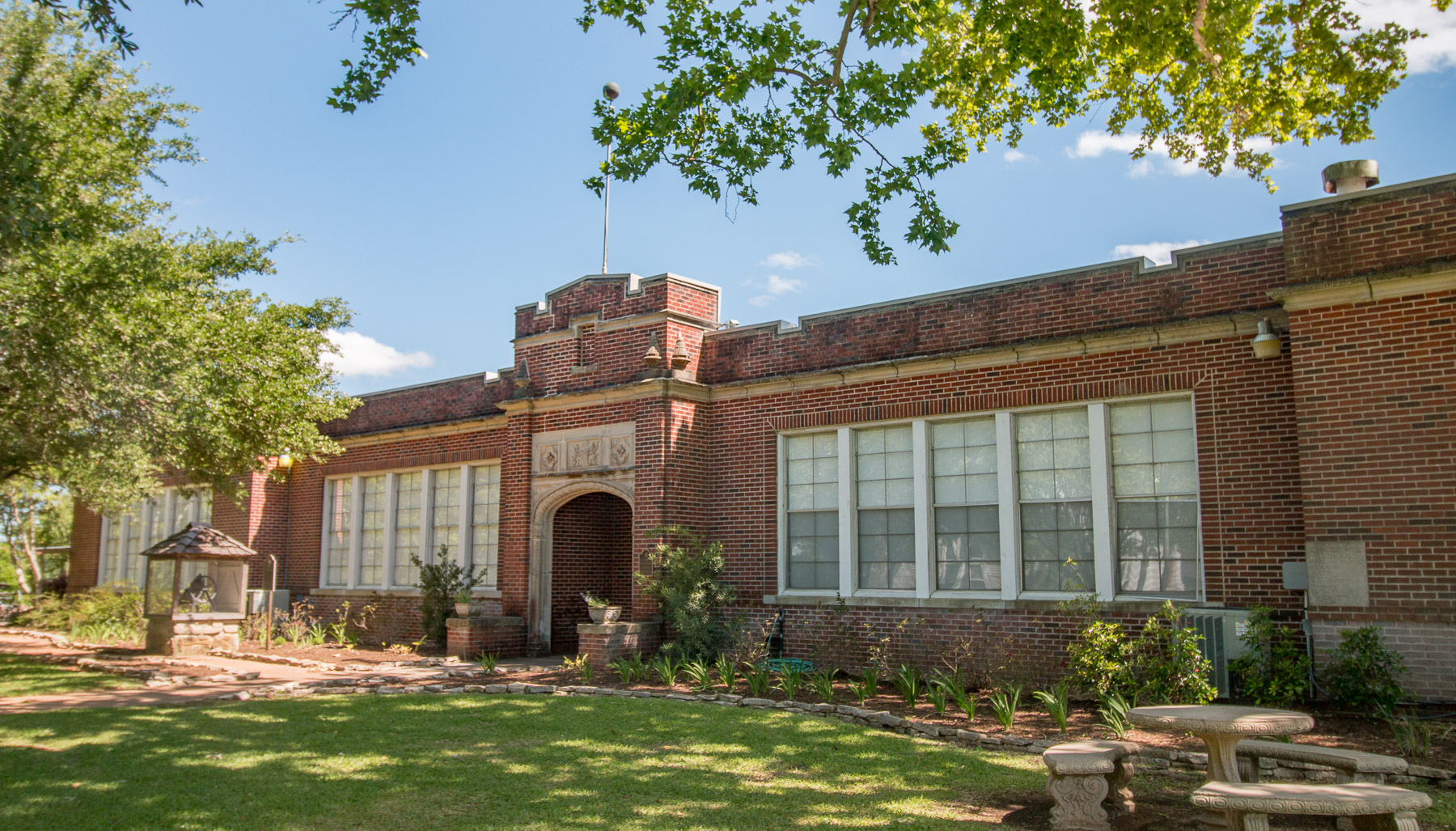
- Chappell Hill Public School in 2018

- Location within Texas Location within the United States
- Location: Poplar St., Chappell Hill, Texas
- Coordinates: 30°8′27″N 96°15′47″W
- Area: 2 acres (0.81 ha)
- Built: 1927
- Built by: Frank Barron
- Architect: Page Brothers
- MPS: Chappell Hill MRA
- NRHP reference No.: 85000345
- Added to NRHP: February 20, 1985

Chappell Hill Public School is a historic school on Poplar Street in Chappell Hill, Texas. The old bell from Chappell Hill Female College, which was at this location until 1912, is preserved on the property.

The public school was built in 1927, replacing the college building, which was used as a school until 1926. It was added to the National Register of Historic Places in 1985. Today it serves as the Chappell Hill Historical Society's museum.

== See also ==
- National Register of Historic Places listings in Washington County, Texas
