= James Walker Log House =

Historic house in Texas, United States

- U.S. National Register of Historic Places
- Recorded Texas Historic Landmark
- Location within Texas Location within the United States
- Nearest city: Brenham, Texas
- Coordinates: 30°10′24″N 96°20′3″W
- Area: less than one acre
- Built: 1824
- NRHP reference No.: 89001143
- RTHL No.: 16819

Significant dates
- Added to NRHP: August 21, 1989
- Designated RTHL: 2011

James Walker Log House is a historic log house in Washington County, Texas near Brenham.

It was built in 1824 and added to the National Register of Historic Places in 1989.

== See also ==
- National Register of Historic Places listings in Washington County, Texas
- Recorded Texas Historic Landmarks in Washington County
