= Burton, Texas =

- City
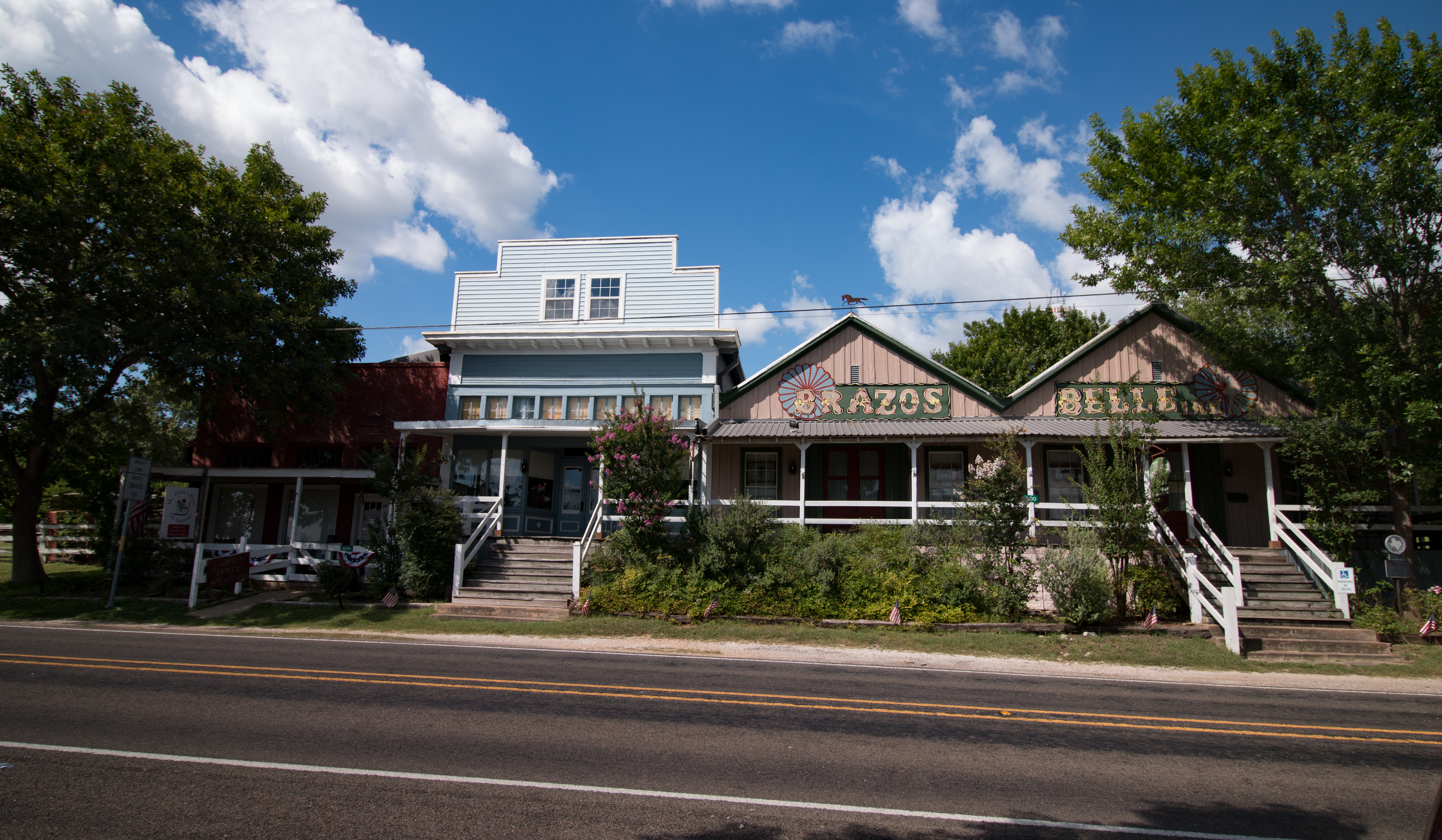
- Downtown Burton
- Interactive map of Burton, Texas
- Coordinates: 30°10′53″N 96°36′00″W
- Country: United States
- State: Texas
- County: Washington

Area
  - Total: 1.20 sq mi (3.10 km^{2})
  - Land: 1.19 sq mi (3.07 km^{2})
  - Water: 0.012 sq mi (0.03 km^{2})
- Elevation: 410 ft (120 m)

Population (2020)
  - Total: 297
  - Estimate (2022): 280
  - Density: 246.62/sq mi (95.22/km^{2})
- Time zone: UTC-6 (Central (CST))
  - Summer (DST): UTC-5 (CDT)
- Zip Code: 77835
- FIPS code: 48-11536
- GNIS feature ID: 2411748
- Website: cityofburton-tx.gov

Burton is a city in Washington County, Texas, United States. Prior to the 2010 census, Burton changed its status from a town to a city. Its population was 294 at the 2020 census.

== History ==
Burton was established in 1870 by John M. Burton, a native of Greensboro, Georgia. In June 1869, Burton sold land to trustees of the Houston and Texas Central Railroad and then sold to citizens. The arrival of the railroad after the Civil War benefited the community. The town received its first postmaster on September 23, 1870. By 1910, its population was 600. The community was incorporated on October 25, 1972.

== Geography ==
According to the United States Census Bureau, the town has a total area of 1.2 square miles (3.1 km^{2}), all land.

Burton lies on Highway 290 between Austin and Houston.

== Demographics ==
Historical population
Census	Pop.	Note	%±
1880	125		—
1890	384		207.2%
1980	325		—
1990	311		−4.3%
2000	359		15.4%
2010	300		−16.4%
2020	297		−1.0%
2022 (est.)	280		−5.7%
U.S. Decennial Census

=== 2020 census ===
As of the 2020 census, Burton had a population of 297. The median age was 50.3 years, with 19.9% of residents under the age of 18 and 31.3% aged 65 or older. For every 100 females there were 102.0 males, and for every 100 females age 18 and over there were 93.5 males age 18 and over.

0% of residents lived in urban areas, while 100.0% lived in rural areas.

There were 130 households in Burton, of which 33.8% had children under the age of 18 living in them. Of all households, 53.8% were married-couple households, 16.9% were households with a male householder and no spouse or partner present, and 25.4% were households with a female householder and no spouse or partner present. About 22.3% of all households were made up of individuals and 7.7% had someone living alone who was 65 years of age or older.

There were 176 housing units, of which 26.1% were vacant. Among occupied housing units, 71.5% were owner-occupied and 28.5% were renter-occupied. The homeowner vacancy rate was 3.1% and the rental vacancy rate was 11.6%.

Racial composition as of the 2020 census
Race	Percent
White	74.4%
Black or African American	13.5%
American Indian and Alaska Native	0.7%
Asian	1.3%
Native Hawaiian and Other Pacific Islander	0%
Some other race	1.7%
Two or more races	8.4%
Hispanic or Latino (of any race)	4.4%

=== 2000 census ===
At the 2000 census, 359 people, 153 households, and 93 families were in the town. The population density was 301.7 inhabitants per square mile (116.5/km^{2}). The 194 housing units had an average density of 163.1 per square mile (63.0/km^{2}). The racial makeup of the town was 67.13% White, 25.35% African American, 0.56% Native American, 1.95% Asian, 3.34% from other races, and 1.67% from two or more races. Hispanics or Latinos of any race were 3.34% of the population.

Of the 153 households, 20.9% had children under 18 living with them, 54.2% were married couples living together, 5.9% had a female householder with no husband present, and 38.6% were not families. About 35.9% of households were one person and 19.0% were one person 65 or older. The average household size was 2.35 and the average family size was 3.11.

The age distribution was 23.7% under 18, 9.7% from 18 to 24, 24.0% from 25 to 44, 18.4% from 45 to 64, and 24.2% 65 or older. The median age was 40 years. For every 100 females, there were 105.1 males. For every 100 females 18 and over, there were 94.3 males.

The median household income was $38,875 and the median family income was $47,321. Males had a median income of $26,406 versus $16,500 for females. The per capita income for the town was $16,496. Around 7.8% of the population and 3.0% of families were below the poverty line. Of the total people living in poverty, 9.7% were under 18 and 12.3% were 65 or older.

== Education ==
Burton is served by the Burton Independent School District.

== Texas Cotton Gin Museum and Festival ==
Burton is home to the Texas Cotton Gin Museum, which is located at the Burton Farmers Gin. The gin was built in 1914 and is considered to be the oldest working cotton gin in the country. Every year in the spring, the Texas Cotton Gin Museum hosts the Burton Cotton Gin Festival. During the annual festival, the cotton gin runs, powered by a 16-ton, 125-horsepower 1925 Bessemer engine called "Lady B."

== Dance hall ==
La Bahia Turn Verein hall is located about 5 miles southwest of the town of Burton. This hall hosts a regular antique fair, as well as traditional dances.
