= Ruter (disambiguation) =

Ruter may refer to:

In companies

- Ruter, Norwegian public transport authority

In people

- Amanda Ruter Dufour (1822 – 1899), American poet; niece of Martin Ruter, sister of Rebecca Ruter Springer
- Gaston Ruter (1898 – 1979), French entomologist
- Martin Ruter (1785 - 1838), American minister, missionary and educator
- Rebecca Ruter Springer (1832 – 1904), American author; niece of Martin Ruter, sister of Amanda Ruter Dufour

Other uses

- Ruter Hall, historic building on the campus of Allegheny College at Meadville, Pennsylvania, U.S.
