= Chappell Hill Circulating Library =

- U.S. National Register of Historic Places
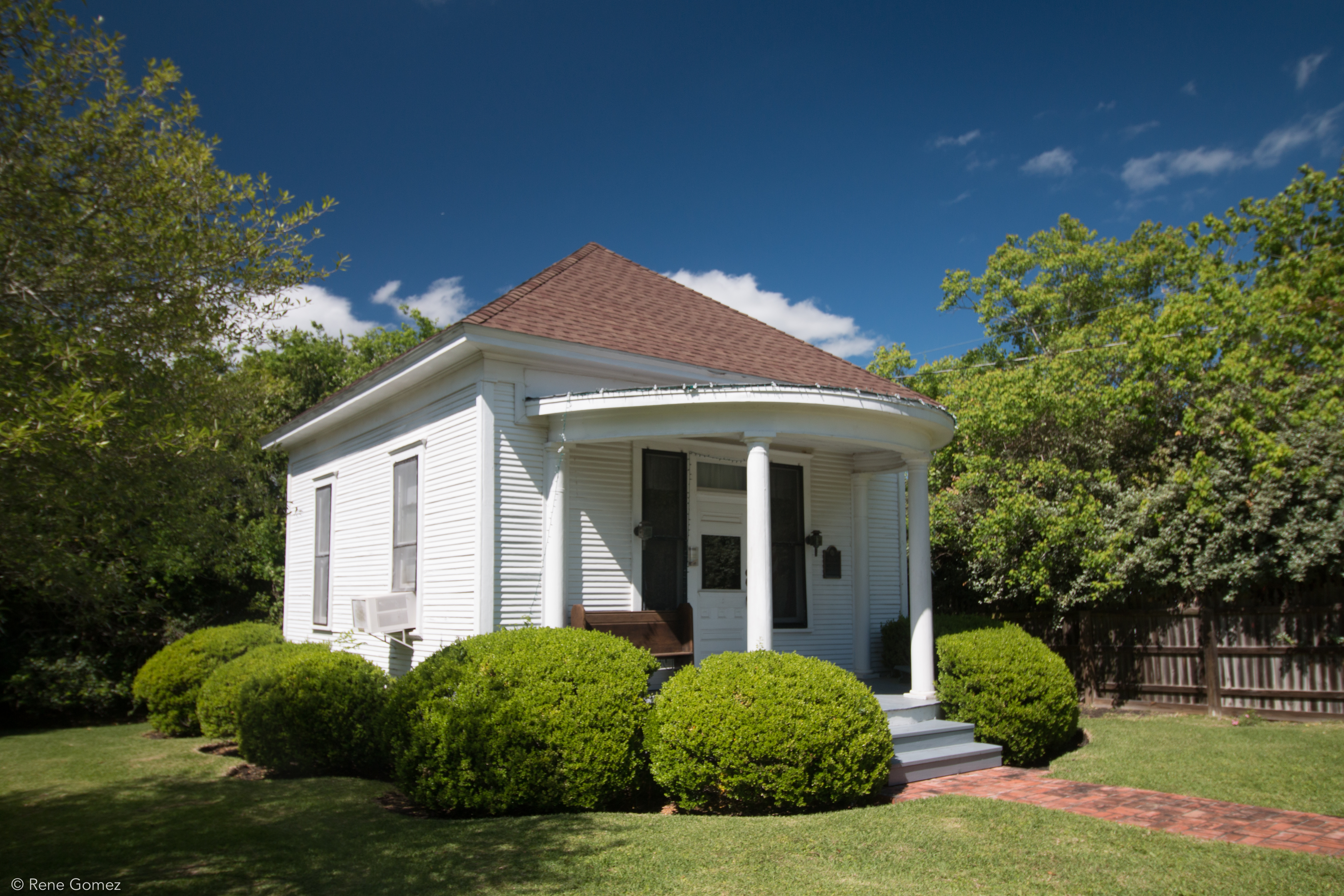
- Chappell Hill Circulating Library in 2018

- Location within Texas Location within the United States
- Location: Cedar St., Chappell Hill, Texas
- Coordinates: 30°8′32″N 96°15′55″W
- Area: less than one acre
- Built: 1912
- Architect: J.W. Heartfield
- Architectural style: Colonial Revival
- MPS: Chappell Hill MRA
- NRHP reference No.: 85000343
- Added to NRHP: February 20, 1985

Chappell Hill Circulating Library is a historic library on Cedar Street in Chappell Hill, Texas.

The library was founded by the Chappell Hill Circulating Library Association in 1893, due to the generosity of W.G. Foote Jr, who donated the library owned by his late father, Dr. W. G. Foote Sr. Dr. Foote was a Methodist minister and a professor at Chappell Hill's Soule University during the mid-nineteenth century.

The collection was stored in various places for the first several years, until the newly formed Civic Club founded by local ladies decided to build a new library on Cedar Street (once called College St.) The three directors of the Circulating Library Association were Mrs. Fannie A. Campbell, Mrs. Joe E. Routt, and Miss Nannie Adams.

It was built in 1912 in a Colonial Revival style by J.W. Heartfield. The plan is nearly square, 20' x 24', with clapboard siding and corner beads. There is a hipped roof that is now asphalt, but was once shingled in cedar. The front elevation exhibits a semi-circular portico supported by two Doric columns capped with oversized capitals and two pilasters.

The interior is simple, with a single room adorned with beaded board wainscoting along the perimeter. Inside is a wrought iron fence from the balcony of the Hiram Thompson home.

When the Chappell Hill Female College closed down in 1912, they donated many of their books to the new public library. Some of them bear the name of the "Philomathean Society," one of two literary societies on the college campus.

Over the years, the building wore down and was damaged. By 1964, its columns were collapsing. Descendants of the original members of the Circulating Library Association decided that it should be saved and formed the Chappell Hill Historical Society. They ran a number of fundraisers, the largest of which was the Antique Show, held during the overlap between National Library Week and one of the Bluebonnet Trail Weekends, and thus the Bluebonnet Festival was born.

That year they were able to restore the library, and to their delight, discovered that the collection was intact! The Historical Society continues to work to preserve the library, and it was added to the National Register of Historic Places on February 20, 1985.

== Photo gallery ==
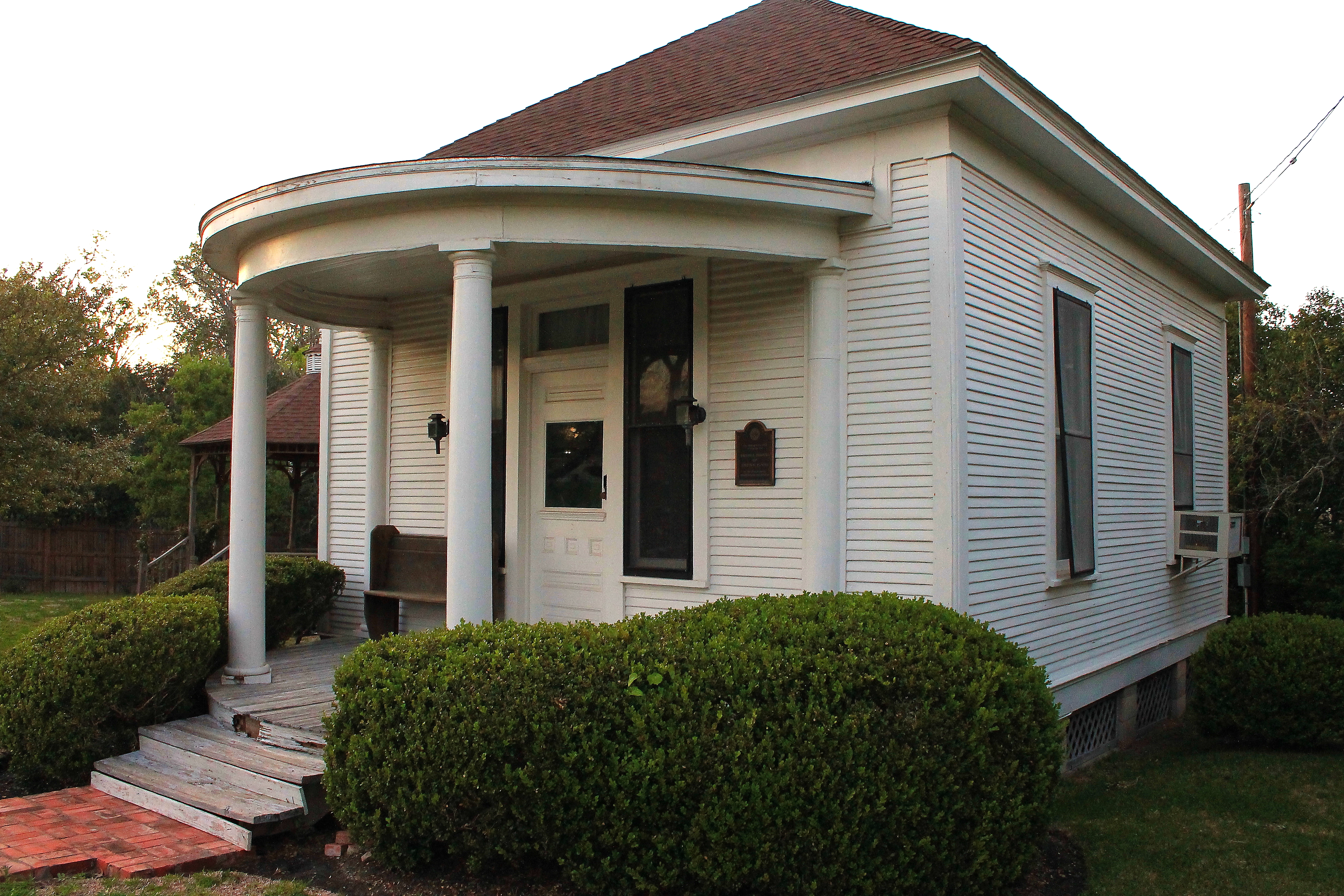

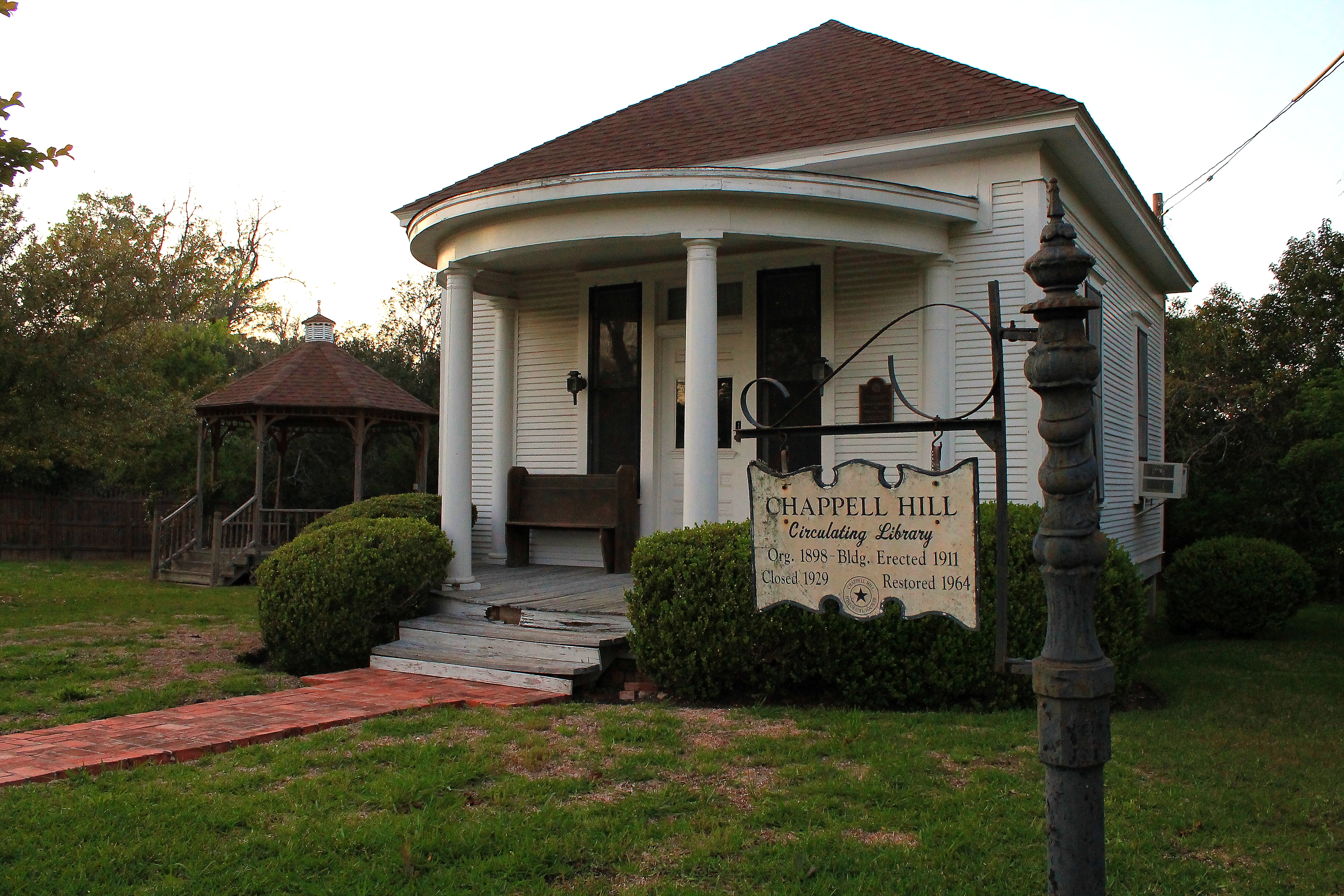

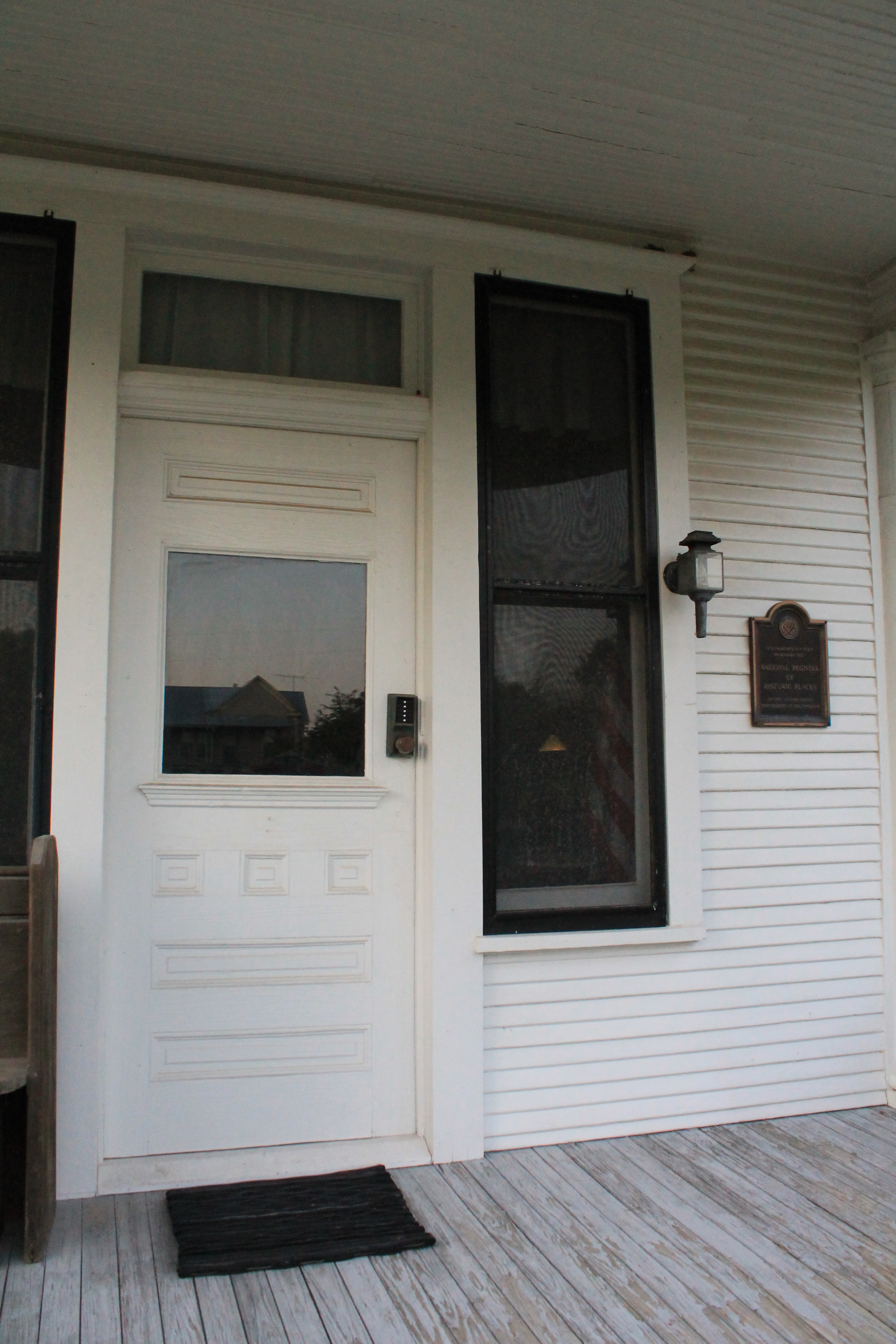

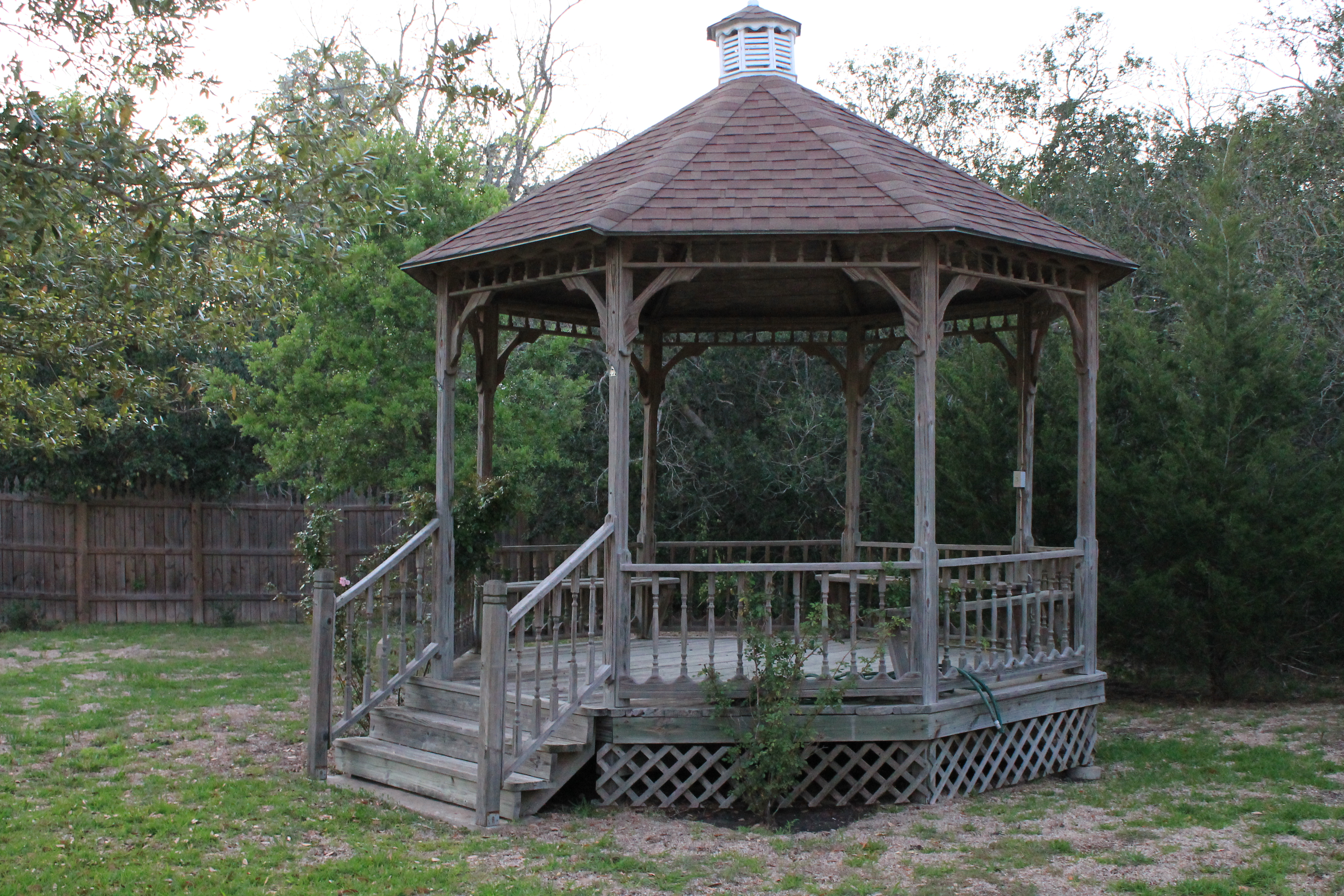

== See also ==
- National Register of Historic Places listings in Washington County, Texas
