= Amanda Ruter Dufour =

American poet (1822–1899)

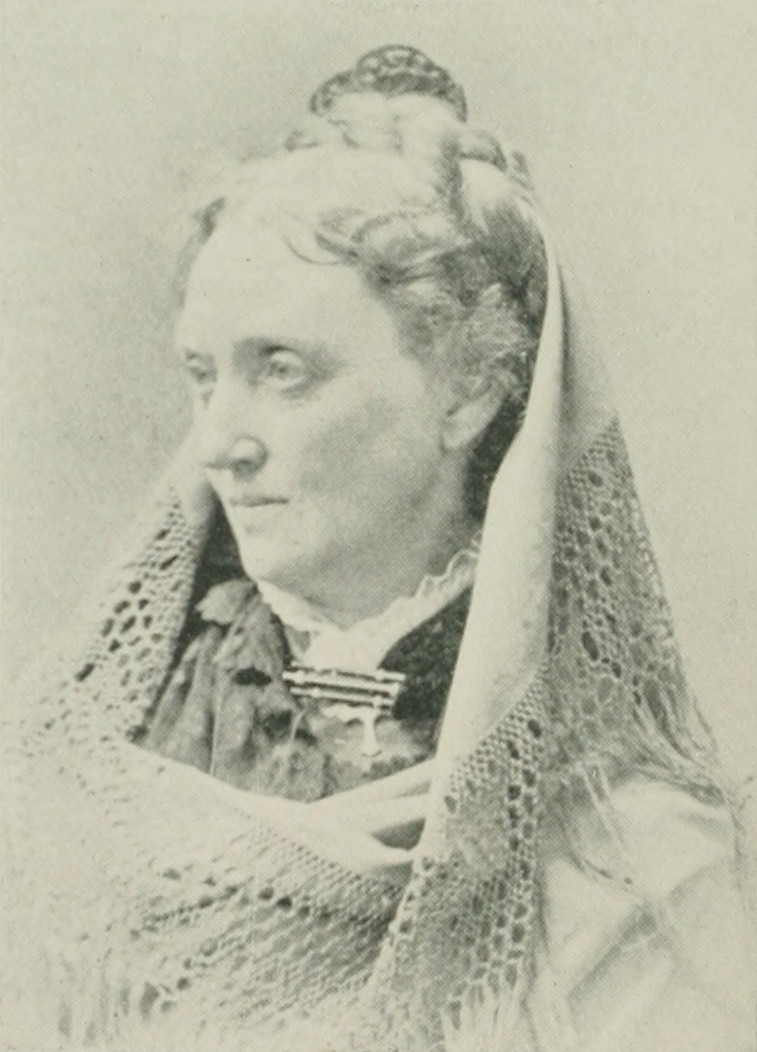
- "A Woman of the Century"
- Born: Amanda Louise Ruter; February 26, 1822; Jeffersonville, Indiana, U.S.
- Died: May 29, 1899 (aged 77); Washington, D.C.
- Resting place: Rock Creek Cemetery, Washington, D.C.
- Occupation: poet
- Spouse: Oliver Dufour (m. 1842)
- Relatives: Rebecca Ruter Springer; Martin Ruter
- Writing career
- Language: English

Amanda Ruter Dufour (née Ruter; February 26, 1822 – May 29, 1899) was a 19th-century American poet. Many of her productions were devotional in nature, and included piety and charity, these being traits she probably inherited from her father. Many of her fugitive pieces were published by the Louisville Journal, the Odd Fellows' Ark, at Columbus, Ohio, and other periodicals. She died in 1899.

== Early life and education ==
Amanda Louise Ruter was born in Jeffersonville, Indiana, on February 26, 1822. She was the oldest daughter of Reverend Calvin Washington Ruter, one of the pioneers of Methodism in Indiana. With his brother, the Reverend Doctor Martin Ruter, the two men were among the most highly educated and eminent ministers of the Methodist Church, who brought the church's early foundations to the valley of the Mississippi River. Her mother was Harriet De Haas Ruter. The father was of Vermont and Puritan ancestry, and the mother was of Virginia and Huguenot ancestry. Writer Rebecca Ruter Springer was one of her siblings.

The years of her earliest childhood were spent on a farm near Lexington, Indiana. Ruter enjoyed spending time by herself in a rustic bower constructed in a woodland pasture adjacent to her home. There, rhymes came to her even before she could read. When she was eight years of age, the family moved to New Albany, Indiana, where she spent her youth.

Conflicting circumstances influenced her character. On the one hand, her father, a man of melancholy temperament and studious habits, required absolute quiet in his household; this gave her many hours for lonely reflection and for the study of books. She began to commit her own thoughts to paper, and these usually assumed a poetical form. Using basic Latin books from her father's library, she tried to teach herself the language. But with her mother's health failing and many of the domestic duties falling on her, she was forced to stay away from books and writing materials, lest the household chores be neglected.

After Dufour was sent to school, her health declined. She persevered, however, until she had learned all she could from her teachers and had reached the qualifications to become a teacher herself. As her father's parishioners were poor, and his financial means were limited, she subsequently assisted by teaching school at Rising Sun, Indiana, to help her parents and to be able to purchase the books she craved.

== Career ==
Dufour had an early and earnest desire to travel: to witness the scenes and wonders which she had read about, and to gather the knowledge and experience which at home, except through reading, was beyond her reach. However, she reached adulthood without having once left her native state.

In 1842, she married Oliver Dufour, then of New Albany, Indiana, but formerly of Vevay, Indiana. Her husband was the son of John Francis Dufour, from Montreux near Vevey, Switzerland. He had come to the West in 1801 when it was all wilderness. In 1809, he settled on the spot where Vevay, Indiana, now stands, then a dense, unbroken forest; he laid out the town in 1813, naming it after his native home on Lake Geneva. He was the first settler west of the mountains to make wine and sent a sample of the first vintage to Thomas Jefferson, then president. It so happened that about the same time, someone had sent the president a bottle of water from the Mississippi River. The water and wine, both from the Western wilderness, were united, and were drank together.

Oliver Dufour was elected to the Indiana Legislature in 1853. He was a prominent member of the Independent Order of Odd Fellows, having been Grand Master of the State of Indiana, Grand Representative of the state and also of the District of Columbia for eight consecutive years. He died in November 1891.

In 1854, he received from President Franklin Pierce an appointment to the United States General Land Office, in Washington, D.C., where he moved with his family. Until the move to Washington, Amanda Dufour had remained a resident of Indiana. She was, therefore, a woman of the West, by birth, by education, by marriage, and by residence, and her poetical talents were exclusively of Western culture. Still, under discouragement, she wrote, "Out of the fullness of the heart the mouth speaketh."

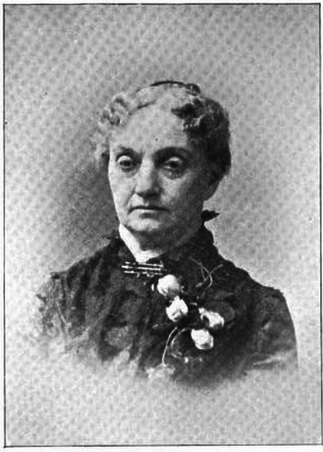
Amanda Louise Ruter Dufour

Dufour composed verses from a young age. Her peculiarly sensitive temperament long kept her talents from being appreciated. Having no confidence in her own abilities, she shrank from criticism. She was fond of writing for children, and published many poems adapted to their comprehension. In 1848, Hon. Joseph A. Wright, then governor of Indiana, sent a block of marble for the Washington monument, on which was inscribed the motto: "No North, No South, Nothing but the Union." This incident suggested to Dufour her poem entitled "The Ark of the Union." It was first published in the Washington Union, and was afterward, without her knowledge, set to music. Some months before the death of the scientist Baron Von Humboldt, Dufour wrote a poem on his distinction as "King of Science." She contributed to the Ladies' Repository, the Masonic Review, the School Day Visitor, the Republican, of Springfield, Ohio, the Louisville Journal, whose editor was the author and poet, George D. Prentice, and the Louisville Democrat. Contemporaries in time and similar in style and sentiment expressed were Julia Louisa Dumont and Mary Louisa Chitwood.

In later years, primarily due to ill health, she was less conspicuous in the literary world. Dufour died in Washington, D.C., May 29, 1899, and was buried there in Rock Creek Cemetery.

== Style and themes ==
Many of her productions were of a devotional character, mingled with piety and charity, which she may have inherited from her father. Her lines on "Thought," fraught with genuine feeling and characterized by graceful imagery, were from an elaborate unpublished poem. A tone of sadness runs through many of her pieces; though it is unknown whether it came from her father, like her piety, or whether it was born of sad experiences. Her sadness, however, was not sickly sentimentality, but rather came from a heart strengthened by hope and courage.

Dufour's "Confession" might alone establish her title to the inborn poetic temperament. There was no true poet who, in moments of inspiration, had not embodied and addressed the ideal. And there was no better test of the depth and purity of the poetic vein than the tone and manner of such an address. Its impassioned lines disclosed the noblest and warmest aspects in the heart of the writer; and in them; therefore, the reader sought, with best chance of obtaining a clue to the just appreciation of the character, and just estimate of the genius which thus conceived and pictured, not what is, but what might be; not what could be found in this world, but still, what could be imagine, and may hope, perhaps, to meet with in another.
