= Soule University =

Methodist university in Chappell Hill, Texas

- The main building of Soule University
- Type: Private
- Active: 1856–1887
- Affiliations: Methodist
- Location: Chappell Hill, Texas, United States
- Campus: Rural

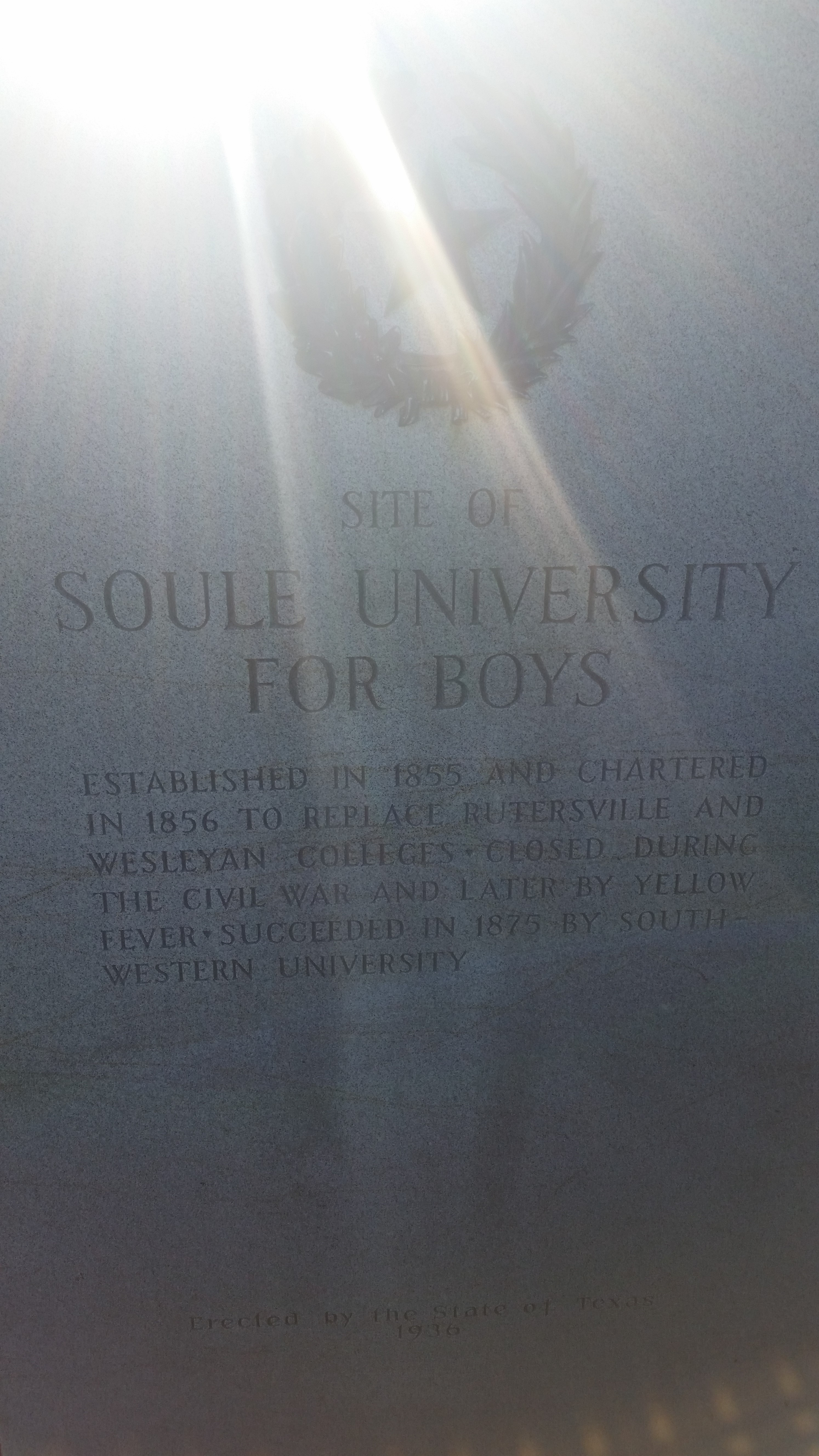
Soule University historical marker in Chappell Hill, Texas

Soule University was a private Methodist university in Chappell Hill, a rural community in Washington County, Texas, United States. Chartered in 1856 and named after Bishop Joshua Soule, the school replaced the male department of Chappell Hill Male and Female Institute and was intended to succeed the struggling Rutersville College. Soule was beset by financial challenges after the American Civil War and two epidemics of yellow fever, leading the Methodist Church and Soule's president to form Southwestern University as a replacement in 1873. Despite the Texas Legislature transferring Soule's charter to Southwestern in 1875, local supporters kept Soule open until 1887 under the name Soule College.

The female department became an independent institution, Chappell Hill Female College, eventually outliving Soule and acquiring its campus.

== History ==
Soule University began as 'Chappell Hill Institute', a private preparatory school informally established during or before 1850. The school was chartered by the Texas Legislature in 1852 as a non-denominational preparatory school under the name Chappell Hill Male and Female Institute. That same year, Philander S. Ruter, son of Methodist missionary Martin Ruter, was elected president of the school. In 1854, Chappell Hill's charter was amended to affiliate the school with the Methodist Church.

The Methodists had been seeking a replacement for the financially unstable and scandal-ridden Rutersville College and identified Chappell Hill as the site for a new institution of higher education. The Methodist Church took great pains to ensure the new school was under the authority of the Methodist Church, attributing some of Rutersville College's failures to the school's independent legal status.

In 1856, Soule University was chartered as a Methodist-affiliated university and all students in the male department of Chappell Hill Male and Female Institute were transferred into Soule's preparatory department. Classes began in September 1856 with seven academic departments. Originally located in the former buildings of Chappell Hill Male and Female Institute, the university built a new building on donated land in 1858 to separate itself from Chappell Hill Female College.

Soule closed in 1861 at the start of the American Civil War with most students joining the Confederate States Army. During the war, the Confederacy used Soule's campus as a hospital. When the university reopened in 1865, the classrooms and library had been badly damaged and most of the school equipment had been lost. The economy of the Chappell Hill area was devastated after the war, limiting the university's sources of funding. When an outbreak of yellow fever in Chappell Hill grew into two epidemics, Soule's student population dropped precipitously and never recovered.

In an effort to broaden the university's reach, Soule opened Texas' first medical school in 1865. The school, located in Galveston, was self-sustaining and eventually severed connections with Soule to become the Texas Medical College and Hospital, now the University of Texas Medical Branch.

The epidemics combined with financial troubles led Soule University president Francis Asbury Mood to petition the Methodist Church to found a new “central university for Methodism” with the full backing of all five Methodist conferences in Texas. The resulting school, originally named Texas University but chartered as Southwestern University, assumed the role for which the Methodist Church had founded Soule. The Church declared Southwestern to be Soule's successor in 1873 and the Texas Legislature transferred Soule's charter to Southwestern in 1875.

Local supporters in Chappell Hill kept Soule open for over a decade after the school's charter was transferred to Southwestern. By 1873, Soule had paid off all debts and was seeking to start a law school in another city, despite recently releasing its neglected medical school in Galveston. The university was renamed Soule College in 1878, but enrollment continued to decrease until only 29 students remained in 1887. In that year, Soule approached Southwestern with a proposal that Soule become a correlated school of Southwestern. The proposal was rejected. Soule University closed in 1887.

Soule's campus was used by Chappell Hill Female College until it closed in 1912.

== Student life ==
The university was home to at least two literary societies, the Alpha Society and the Adelphi Society. A chapter of the Phi Gamma Delta fraternity was chartered in 1861 before the university closed at the start of the Civil War. The chapter disbanded in 1866 when returning members of the fraternity transferred to Washington and Lee University. Soule's newspaper, The University Stylus, was established in 1871.
