= Main Street Historic District (Chappell Hill, Texas) =

Historic district in Texas, United States

- U.S. National Register of Historic Places
- U.S. Historic district
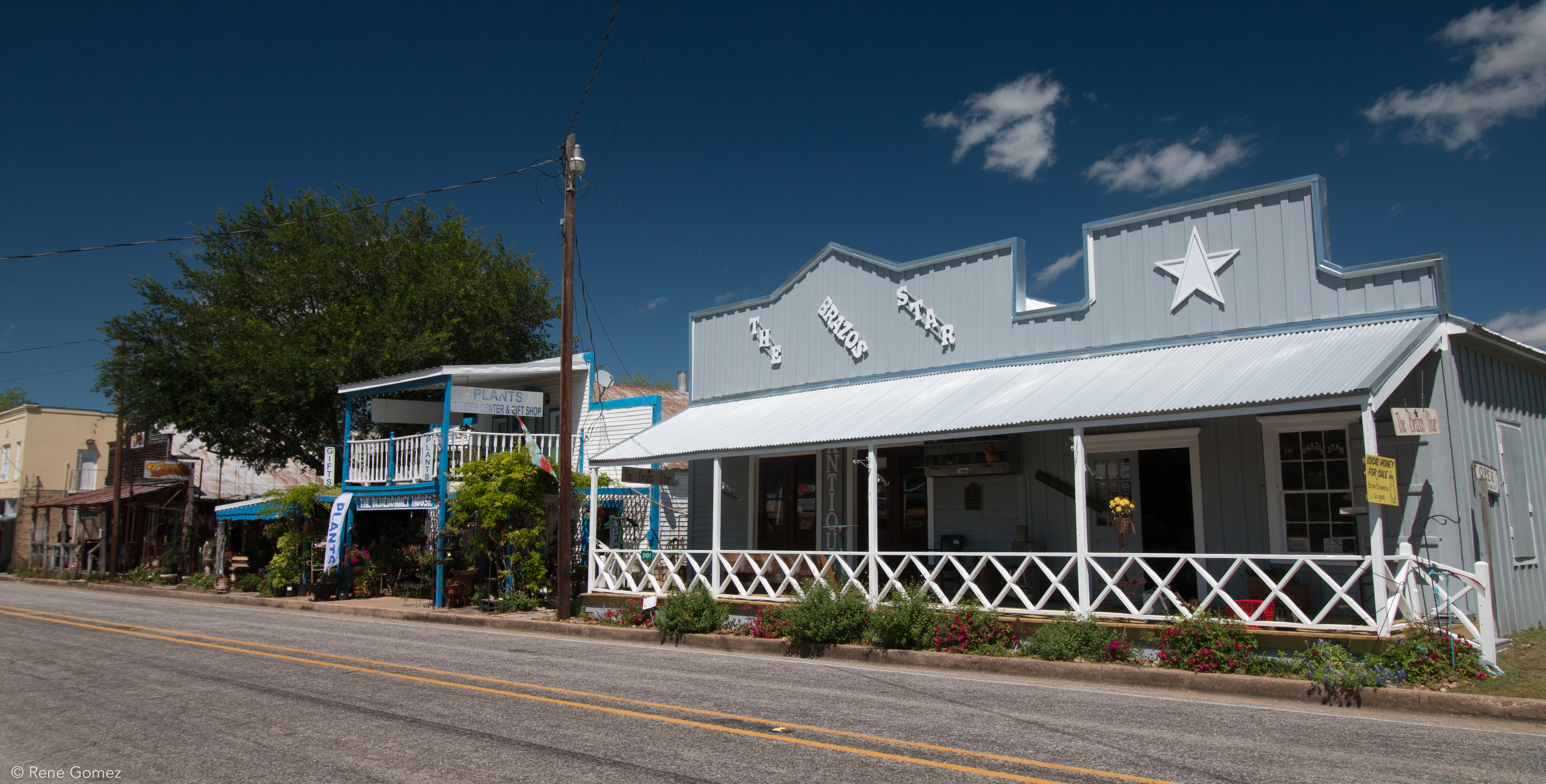
- Farmers State Bank and Reinstein Store in 2012

- Location within Texas Location within the United States
- Location: Chappell Hill, Texas
- Coordinates: 30°8′35″N 96°15′25″W
- Area: 41 acres (17 ha)
- Built: 1850
- Architect: Multiple
- MPS: Chappell Hill MRA
- NRHP reference No.: 85001175
- Added to NRHP: May 15, 1985

Main Street Historic District is located in Chappell Hill, Washington County, Texas, U.S.A.

The district was added to the United States, National Register of Historic Places on May 15, 1985, under National Register Information System ID: 85001175. The Texas Historical Commission also has a registration of this site, under atlas number 2085001175.

== Photo gallery ==
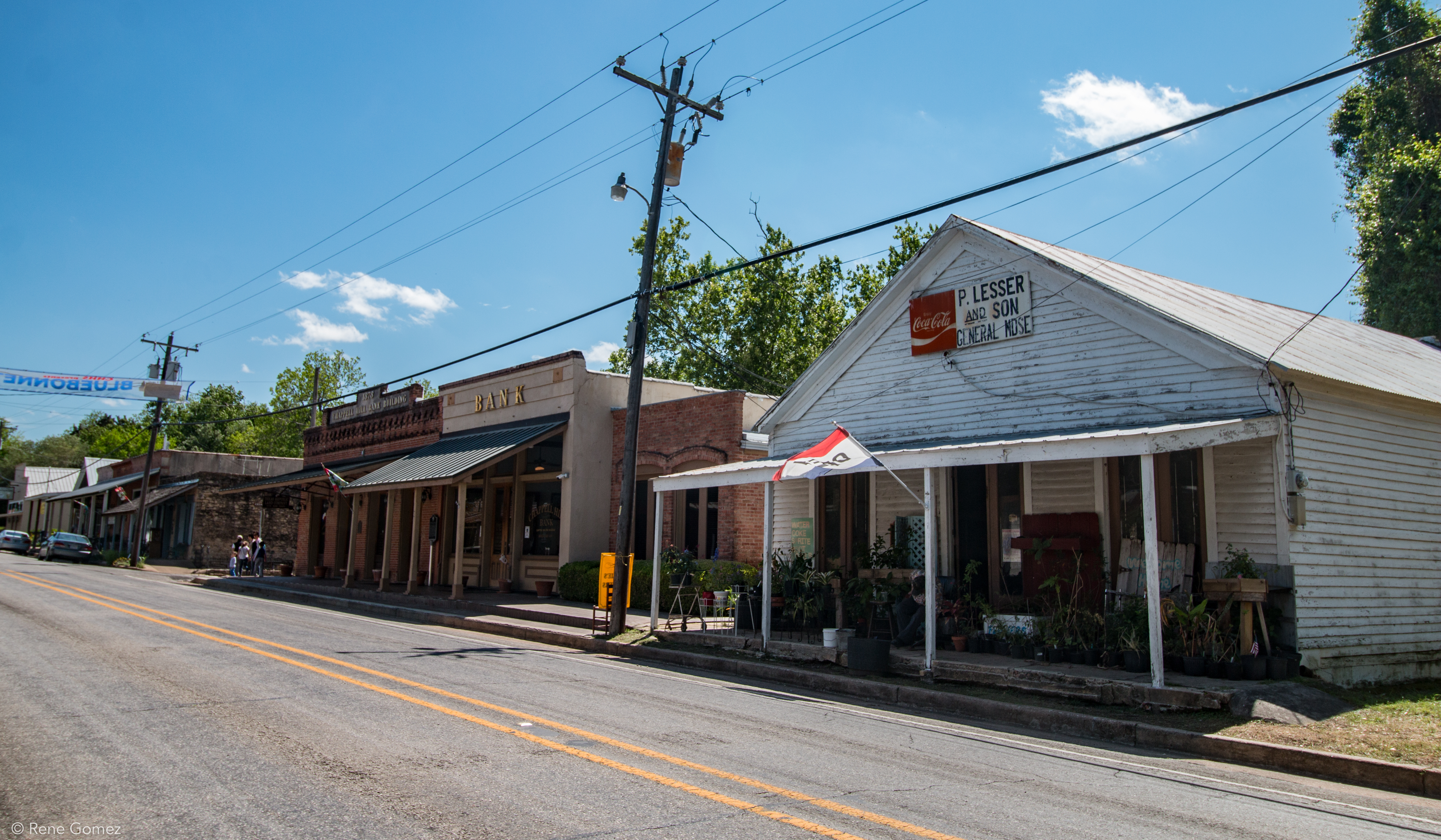

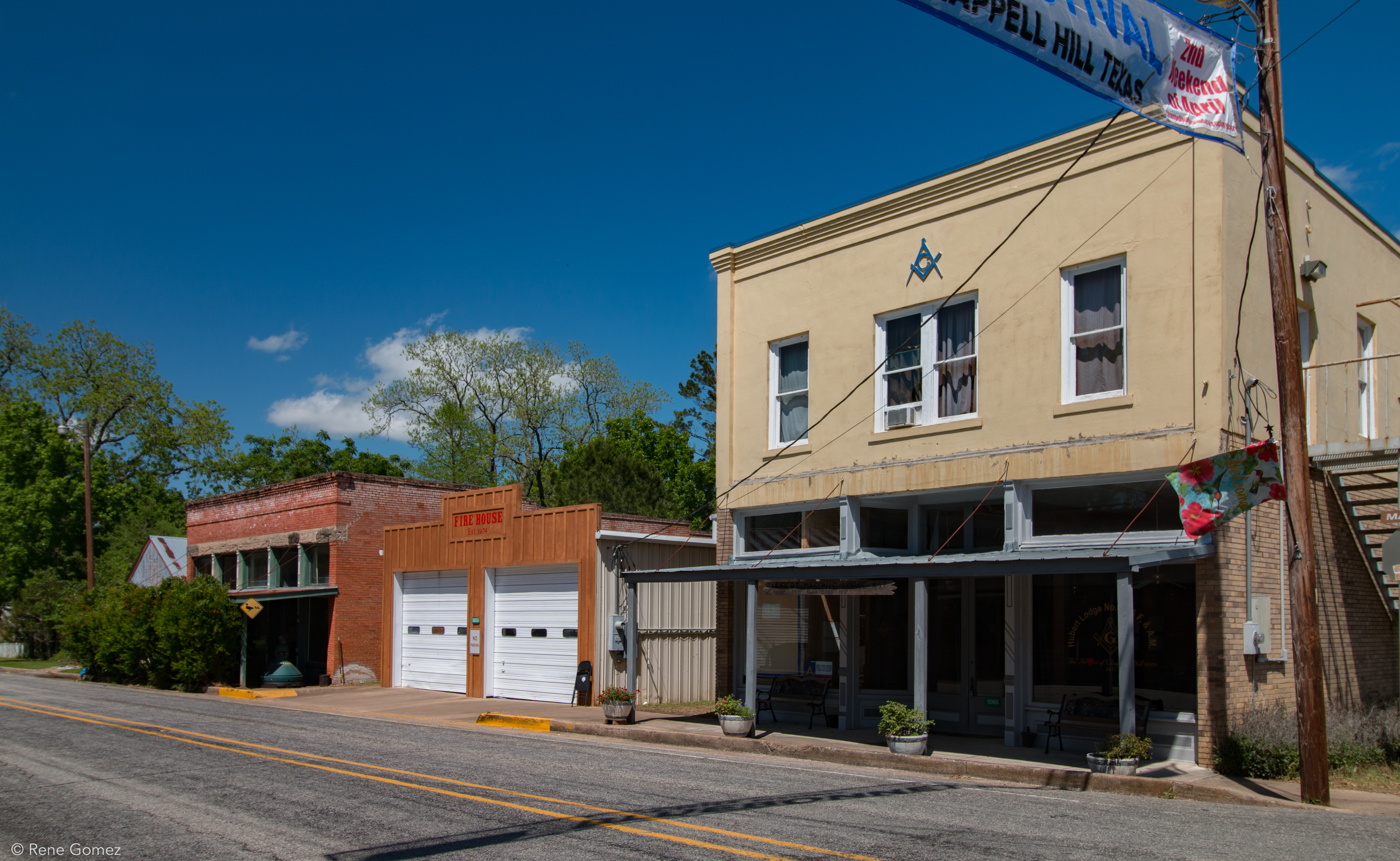

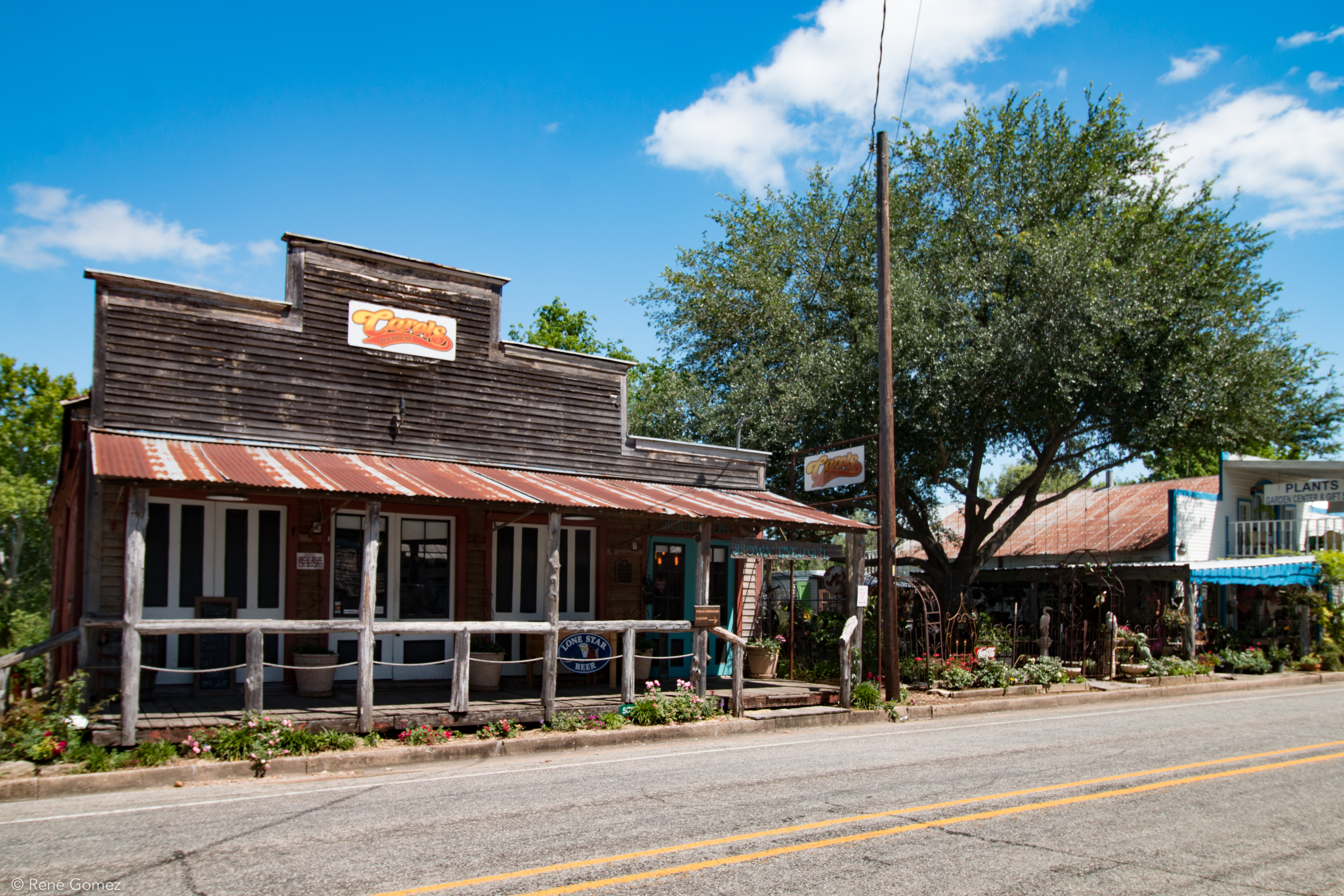

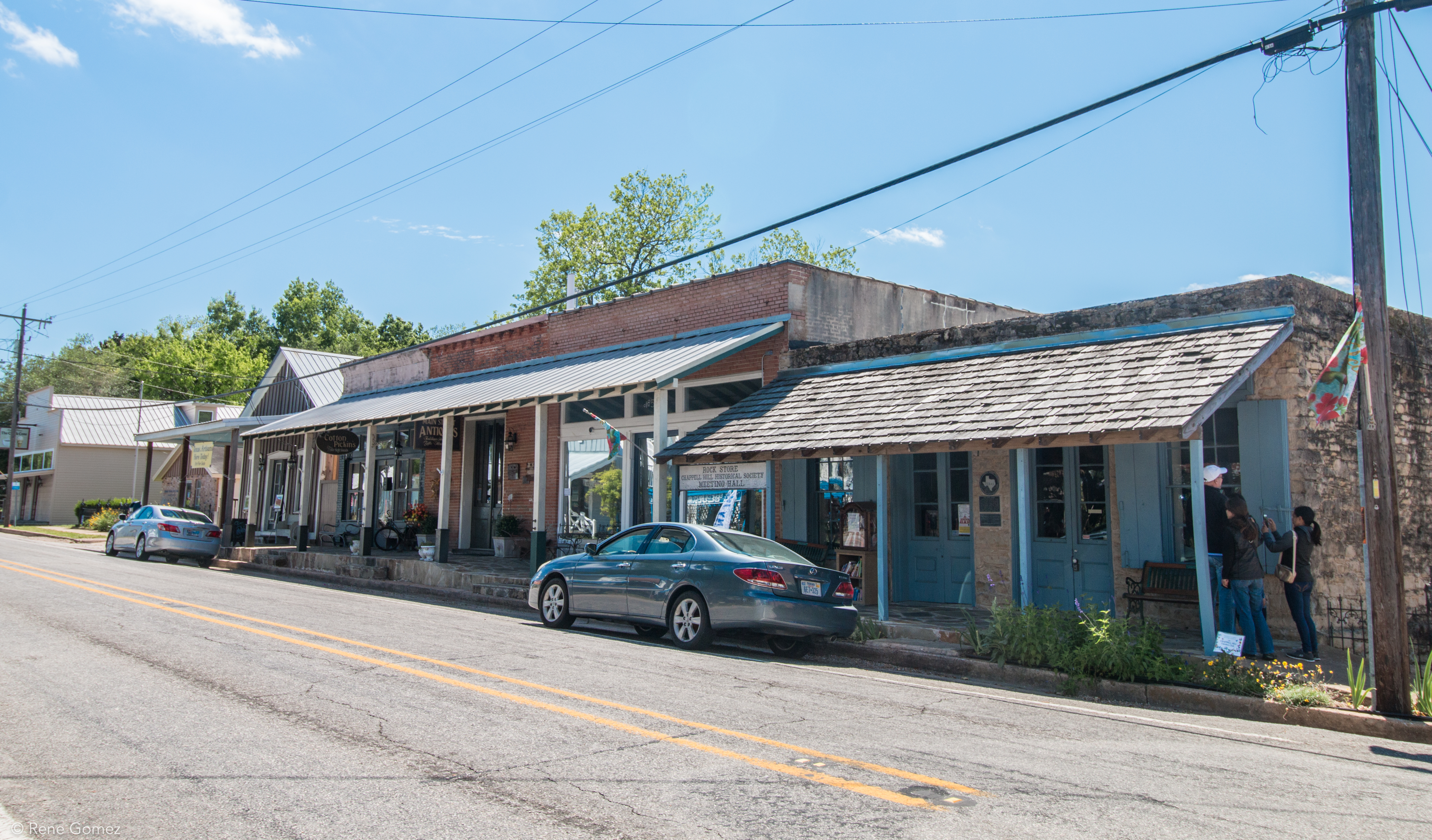

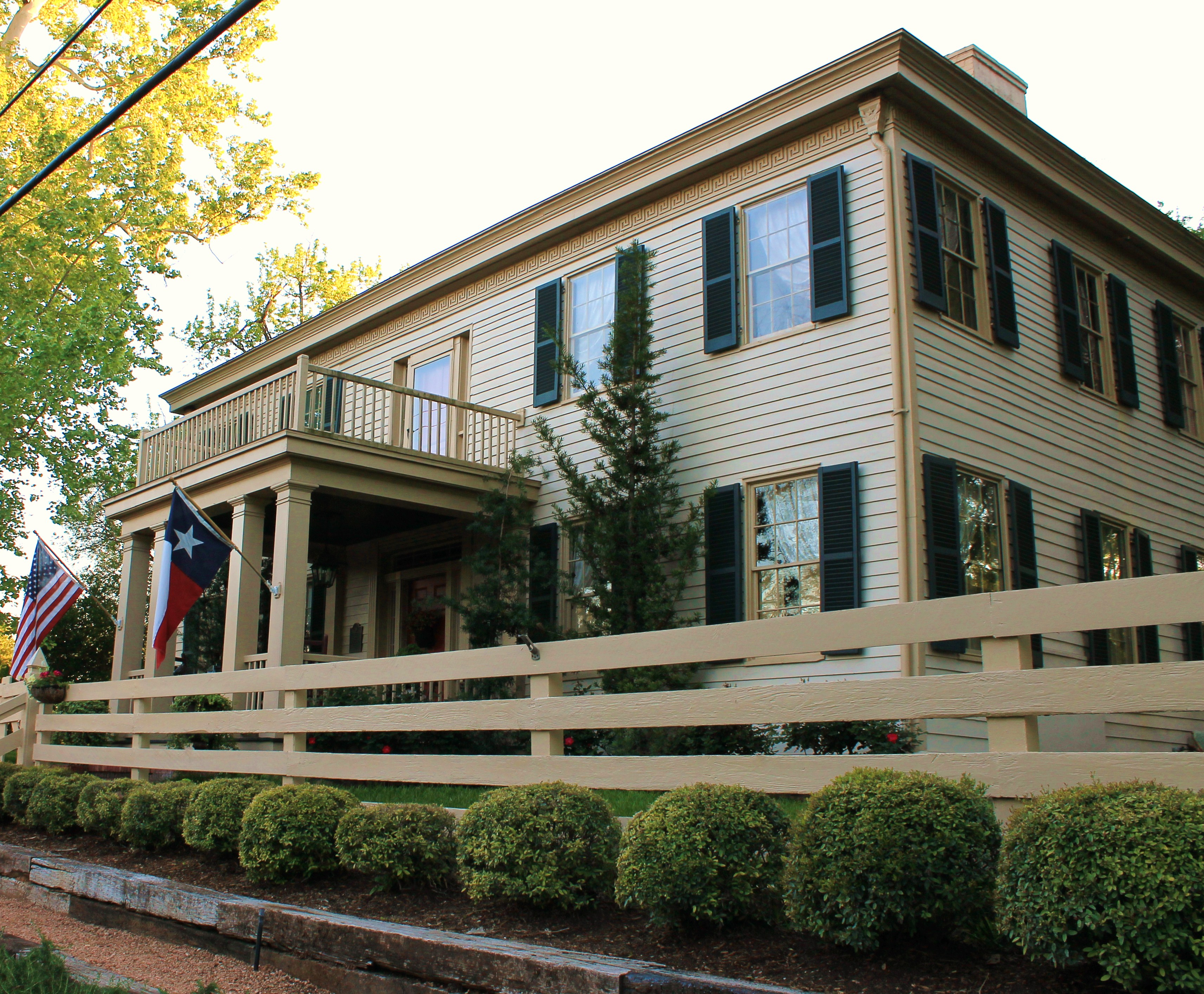

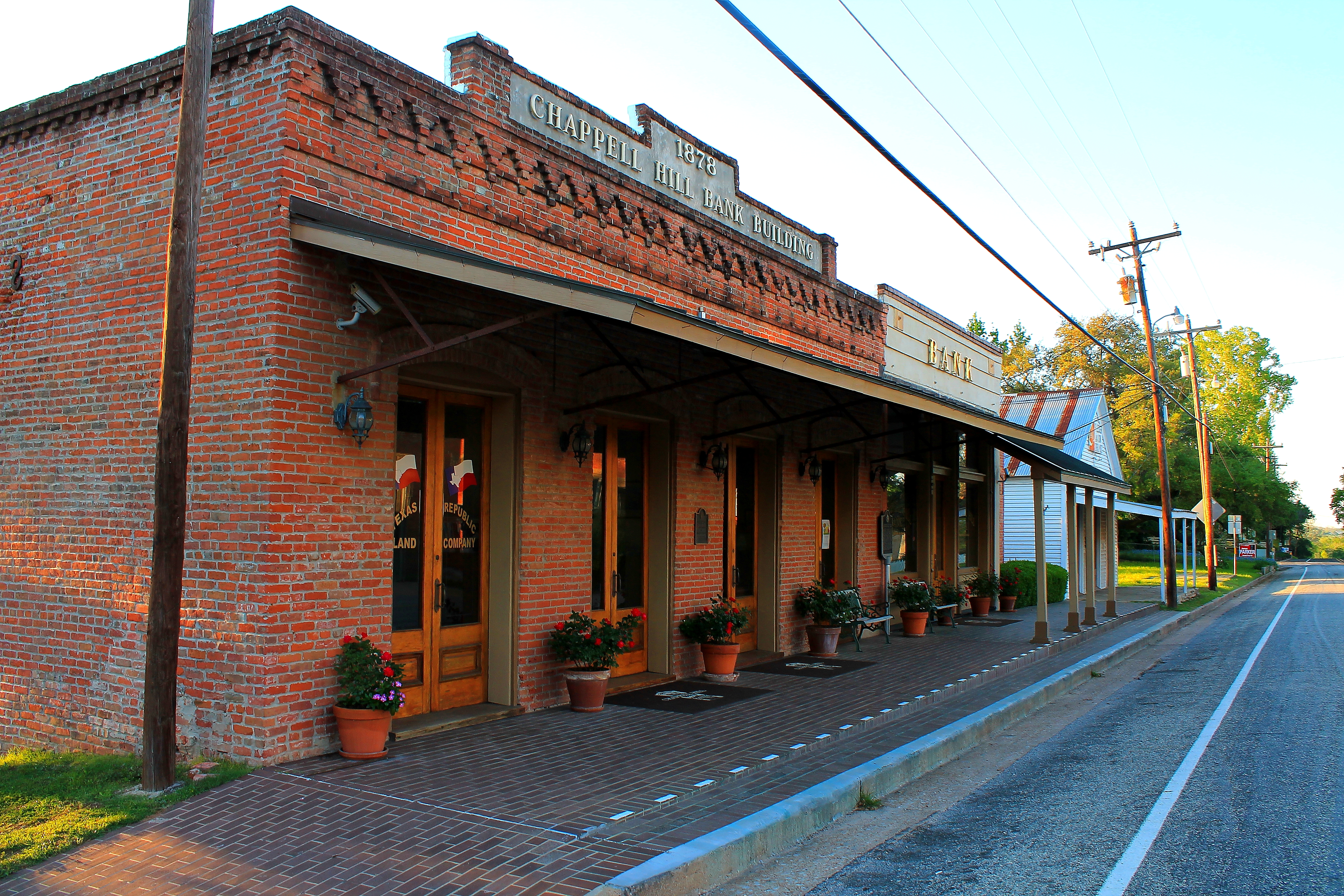

== See also ==
- Stagecoach Inn of Chappell Hill
- National Register of Historic Places listings in Washington County, Texas
