= Rebecca Ruter Springer =

American author (1832–1904)

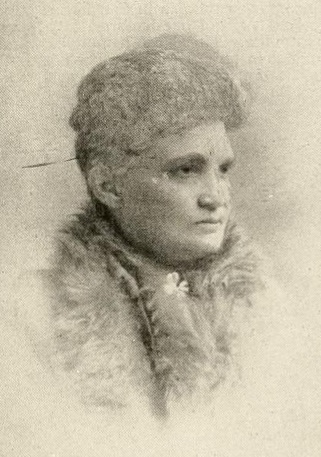
- "A woman of the century"
- Born: Rebecca Ruter; November 8, 1832; Indianapolis, Indiana, U.S.
- Died: September 7, 1904 (aged 71); Jacksonville, Illinois, U.S.
- Resting place: Oak Ridge Cemetery, Springfield, Illinois, U.S.
- Occupation: writer
- Spouse: William McKendree Springer (m. 1859; died 1903)
- Children: Ruter William Springer
- Relatives: Amanda Ruter Dufour, Martin Ruter
- Writing career
- Language: English
- Notable works: Intra Muros, better known today as My Dream of Heaven

Rebecca Ruter Springer (November 8, 1832 – September 7, 1904) was an American author. She began to publish verses shortly after finishing school, and thereafter contributed to leading periodicals. Among her works is the Christian book Intra Muros, better known today as My Dream of Heaven. As the modern name implies, Springer claimed to have a vision of a Christian heaven, and she recounts this vision in her book as well as some personal insights.

== Early years and education ==
Rebecca Ruter was born in Indianapolis, Indiana on November 8, 1832, the daughter of Calvin Washington Ruter, a Methodist clergyman in Indiana. Her father, the Rev. Calvin Ruter, and his brother, the Rev. Dr. Martin Ruter, were among the most highly educated and eminent ministers of the Methodist Church, who, at an early day, brought the foundations of that religion to the valley of the Mississippi River. Her sister, Amanda Ruter Dufour, was a poet.

Her earliest years were divided between New Albany, Indiana and Indianapolis, and her later academic studies were carried on at the Wesleyan Female College in Cincinnati. Like Alexander Pope, she "lisped in numbers", and her earliest writings were dedicated to the Muses. However, her love of verse, which grew with her years, was nourished as a secret passion. No one ever saw or heard a line of her metrical composition until she had nearly reached womanhood and was about to be graduated by her alma mater. By accident one of her teachers discovered her gift of song, and she was induced to read one of her poems at a school exhibition. It was received with enthusiasm. She graduated at the age of 18.

== Career ==
She married William McKendree Springer on December 15, 1859, later a lawyer and member of the Illinois General Assembly. William Ruter Springer, the couple's only child, was born a few years later and went on to graduate from a private military academy in Virginia in 1880. She wrote several books of verse and two novels, entitled Beechwood and Self, and a volume of poems under the title Songs of the Sea, a quarto volume of 170 pages, with numerous toned engravings.

Springer passed much of her life in Washington D.C., and no woman was more beloved nor more conspicuous through her abilities and charm of manner. She and her husband left for a two-year European tour in 1868 to improve her health, which at the time had been described as "feeble"; a condition which persisted until her death, September 7, 1904. Admirers of her work included George D. Prentice, John Greenleaf Whittier, Henry Wadsworth Longfellow, and others.
