= Alonzo Sledge =

American politician (1854–1918)

Alonzo Sledge (August 15, 1854 – October 14, 1918) was a preacher and state representative in Texas. He served in the Texas House from 1879 to 1881.

He was a Republican. He lived in Chappell Hill. He was a Baptist. He married and had daughters.

He and other African American legislators who served during or after Reconstruction are listed on a monument that was unveiled in 2010.

== See also ==
- Sixteenth Texas Legislature
- African American officeholders from the end of the Civil War until before 1900
