= Chappell Hill Methodist Episcopal Church =

Historic church in Texas, United States

- U.S. National Register of Historic Places
- Recorded Texas Historic Landmark
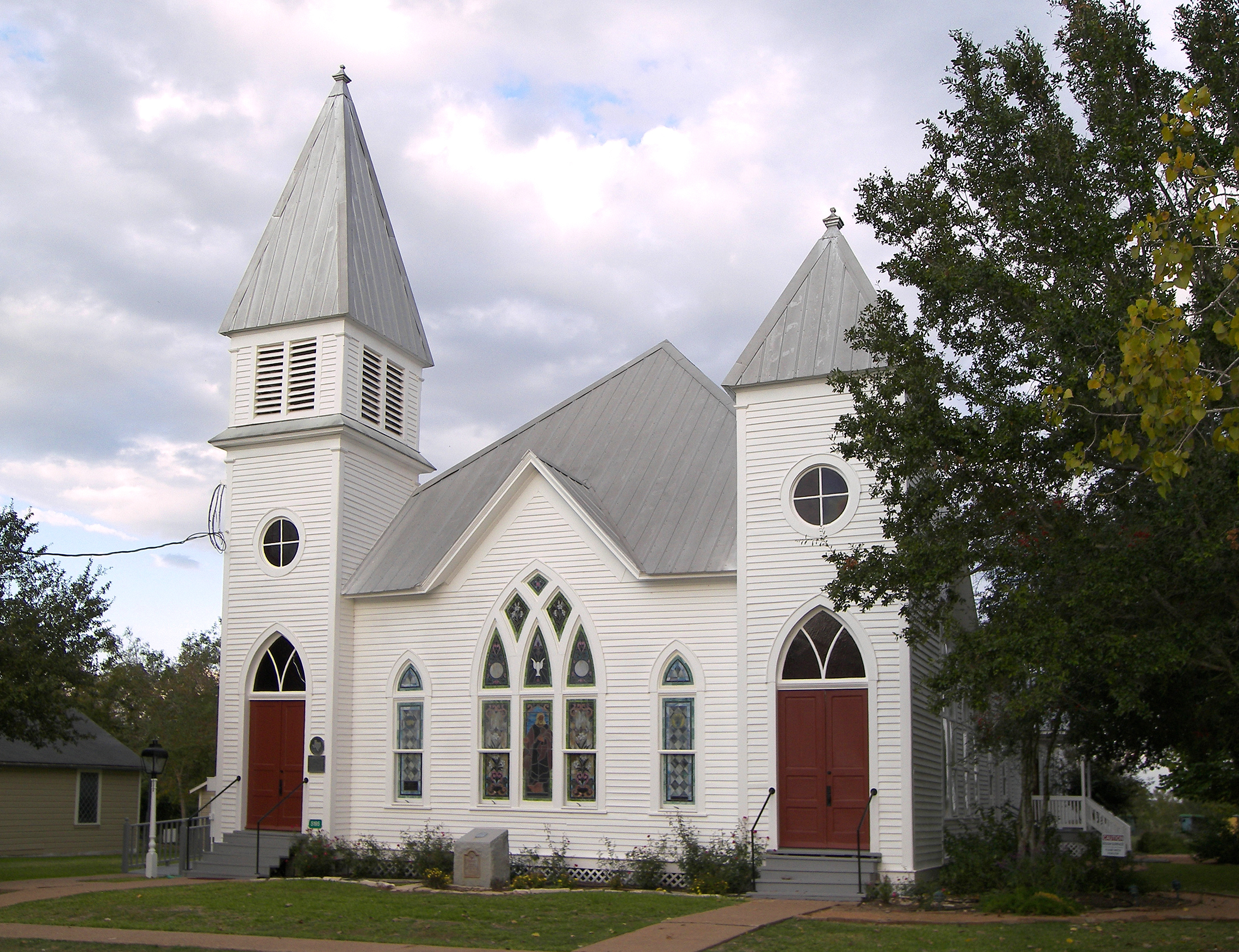
- Chappell Hill Methodist Church in 2008

- Location within Texas Location within the United States
- Location: Church St., Chappell Hill, Texas
- Coordinates: 30°8′36″N 96°15′8″W
- Area: 1 acre (0.40 ha)
- Built: 1901
- Architect: Heinrich C. Brandt
- Architectural style: Carpenter Gothic
- MPS: Chappell Hill MRA
- NRHP reference No.: 85000344
- RTHL No.: 8370

Significant dates
- Added to NRHP: February 20, 1985
- Designated RTHL: 1967

Chappell Hill Methodist Church is a historic church on Church Street in Chappell Hill, Texas.

== History ==
The current Carpenter Gothic church building was constructed in 1901 Heinrich C. Brandt, but the church congregation and its Wesleyan tradition date back to 1849.

In 1849, Chappell Hill's founders, Jacob Haller and Mary Hargrove Haller, dedicated an acre, adjacent to the Chappell Hill Academy, for a church site. Five years earlier the national Methodist Episcopal Church had split into a Northern and Southern conference after being united since the founding of Methodism in America in 1789.

The first church building was erected in 1853 and continually served as a house of worship until September 9, 1900, when it was destroyed by the Great Storm of 1900. The present building was constructed in 1901.

The two General Conferences, Methodist Episcopal Church (or northern section) and Methodist Episcopal Church, South, remained separate until the 1939 merger of these two denominations plus a third, the Methodist Protestant Church, the resulting church being known as the Methodist Church.

On April 23, 1968, the United Methodist Church was created when the Evangelical United Brethren Church and the Methodist Church joined hands at the constituting General Conference in Dallas, Texas. The church continues as an active and growing congregation in the twenty-first century, with a full-time ordained pastor, weekly worship services and faith-based activities almost every day of the week.

The church building was added to the National Register of Historic Places in 1985.

== See also ==
- National Register of Historic Places listings in Washington County, Texas
- Recorded Texas Historic Landmarks in Washington County
