= Chappell Hill Female College =

Private college in Texas, U.S.

Coordinates: 30.140852°N 96.253014°W

- Type: Private
- Active: 1850–1912
- Affiliations: Methodist
- Location: Chappell Hill, Texas, United States
- Campus: Rural

Chappell Hill Female College was a private college in Chappell Hill, a rural community in Washington County, Texas, United States. It was founded in 1850 as part of the coeducational school Chappell Hill Male and Female Institute. First chartered by the Texas Legislature in 1852 as a non-denominational preparatory school, the charter was amended to affiliate the school with the Methodist Church in 1854, and was rechartered as a women's college after the male department was spun off as Soule University in 1856. It was closed in 1912 and the building became a public school until a replacement was built in 1927 that preserves the college's bell. The site was added to the National Register of Historic Places in 1985.

== History ==
The college was founded in 1850 with five teachers and 100 students as Chappell Hill Institute, a boarding school; the land was donated by Jacob and Mary Haller. It was chartered by the Texas Legislature on February 9, 1852 as Chappell Hill Male and Female Institute. A second building was added that year to separate the sexes. In fall 1852 it became Chappell Hill College and P. S. Ruter, who had taught at Transylvania University, became president. His sister Charlotte was head of the music department, and Elizabeth Knox headed the female division. Tuition for a session of five months was advertised as ranging from $8 for "reading and spelling" to $20 for "Natural Philosophy, Chemistry, Astronomy, Physiology, Algebra, Geometry, Latin, Greek, or the higher branches of Mathematics" and $25 for music or piano "with use of instrument".

In 1854 the college had 100 students, and was acquired by the Methodist Church as a replacement for Rutersville College. The male division became Soule University, and the female division was rechartered on August 29, 1856, as Chappell Hill Female College. Fires required replacing the building at least once, and the college was badly affected by the Civil War and by yellow fever epidemics, but it had paid off its debts by 1873. In 1878 the president was Epaminondas Dunn Pitts. In 1880–1881 the president was I. M. Onins, a Civil War veteran. A dormitory and a music hall were added in the 1880s, and the college played a prominent role in the culture of the area, particularly after Soule University closed in 1887; the college's monthly literary magazine, the Philomathean, was active in raising money in the mid-1880s to establish a home for Confederate veterans.

Enrollment had risen to 112 by 1885, but fell by half in the following ten years: the college took in 70 public school students, 50 of them boys, to raise money. The Methodist Texas Conference provided support, and the college was given the Soule University property to reduce its debt, but public schools in Texas were improving, women's colleges were less popular, and yellow fever continued to be a problem in the area. The curriculum was revised in 1900 to conform to the Methodist Church General Board of Education; a study published in January 1912 assessed the college as offering primarily secondary-school level courses. It was closed in 1912, at which time enrollment was 112. The building was used as a public school until 1926, when it was replaced by the building that now houses the museum of the Chappell Hill Historical Society. The college bell has been preserved there.

== Notable people ==
- Lizzie Johnson Williams, cattlewoman: graduated 1859

== See also ==
- Soule University
- Rutersville College
