= Rutersville College =

Former college in Texas, United States

- The main building of Rutersville College
- Active: 1840–1856
- Founder: Martin Ruter
- Affiliations: Independent (Methodist)
- Location: Rutersville, Texas, United States
- Campus: Rural

Rutersville College (occasionally misspelled Ruterville College), was a college located in the unincorporated community of Rutersville in Fayette County, Texas, United States. Chartered under the Republic of Texas in 1840, Rutersville College was Texas's first institution of higher education. It was named for Methodist missionary and educator Martin Ruter, who wrote the school's charter and raised funds to establish the institution, which he originally intended to be named Bastrop College. The Congress of Texas initially rejected the school's charter because it affiliated the school with the Methodist Church. Ruter died two years before the school finally opened under a revised charter excluding a religious affiliation.

== History ==
The school opened on February 1, 1840, with three instructors teaching courses divided among nine departments, including classical, professional, and preparatory subjects. Rutersville added additional faculty as the student body grew from 63 students in 1840 to a peak of 194 students in 1844.

For the remainder of the school's existence, Rutersville was impacted by administrative turmoil, financial instability, and several external factors. From 1846 to 1848, male students were drawn away from the college to fight in the Mexican–American War. Increased competition from newly-founded Baylor University (1845) and Chappell Hill Male and Female Institute (1850) decreased enrollment at Rutersville. Land given to the college by donors to be sold for financial support depreciated in value, leaving the college with insufficient funds.

The school received negative publicity related to the influence of the Methodist Church while local ministers were disappointed that Rutersville was not officially recognized as a Methodist institution. To satisfy religious supporters, the college amended its charter in 1849 to give the Methodist Conference authority to fill vacancies on the board of trustees. However, a sex scandal in 1850 drove the Methodist Conference to abandon Rutersville in favor of establishing ties to Chappell Hill Male and Female Institute.

As Rutersville's debts mounted and the student population dwindled, the college ceased offering classes and the board of trustees leased Rutersville's campus to the Texas Monumental and Military Institute of Galveston in 1856. That same year, the Methodist Church broke up Chappell Hill Male and Female Institute to establish Soule University as a replacement for Rutersville, with the final president of Rutersville, William Halsey, serving as the first president at Soule.

When the Methodist Church sought to create a successor to Soule in 1873, Southwestern University was formed as a continuation of both the Rutersville and Soule charters. The Rutersville campus was purchased by the Southern German Conference of the Methodist Church in 1883, abandoned in 1894, and razed sometime later. Only the bell from Rutersville's main building survives, currently located on the campus of Southwestern University.

== See also ==
- Soule University
- Chappell Hill Female College
