= Brenham Banner-Press =

Daily newspaper based in Brenham, Texas, U.S.

- Type: Daily newspaper
- Format: Broadsheet
- Owner(s): South Texas News, Inc.
- Founded: 1866
- Headquarters: 2430 Stringer, Brenham, Texas, 77833, United States
- Circulation: 1,500 (as of 2024)
- OCLC number: 14351524
- Website: brenhambanner.com

The Brenham Banner-Press is a newspaper based in Brenham, Texas which publishes two issues per week (Thursday and Saturday), covering the Washington County area in southeast Texas. It is published on Tuesday through Friday in the afternoon, and on Sunday mornings. Owned by South Texas News, Inc., the Brenham Banner-Press offers a mix of local, state, and national news, as well as information about community events and sports.

== History ==
=== Southern Banner/Brenham Banner ===
The Brenham Banner-Press was originally named the Southern Banner when it was first published in 1866 by John Gilbert Rankin, a former Confederate soldier in the American Civil War and a founder of the Texas Press Association. The Southern Banner reflected Rankin's opposition to Reconstruction Era policies by containing a distinct Democratic bias. In 1871, the paper was renamed the Brenham Banner and was published in semiweekly and weekly editions. In 1876, a daily version of the paper, known as the Brenham Daily Banner, was published by Rankin and a man named Levin. From 1877–1907, a weekly version, known as the Brenham Weekly Banner, was still published by Rankin and a man named McCrimmon. In the later years of the Brenham Weekly Banner, the focus of the paper shifted from Democratic political agendas to local and statewide reporting, covering news in nearby towns such as Burton, Chappell Hill, and Bellville. Rankin suspended the Brenham Weekly Banner in 1907.

=== Merger with Brenham Daily Press ===
The Brenham Daily Press was founded by George Tucker in 1893. In 1913, it merged with the Brenham Daily Banner to form the Brenham Daily Banner Press, which was published as a daily and weekly newspaper from 1913–1926. The paper became the first daily in Texas to hire a female editor, in 1917. Brenham Daily Banner Press publisher George A.T. Neu was president of the Texas Press Association in 1927.

=== Brenham Banner Press ===
The paper was renamed The Brenham Banner-Press in 1926 and stopped publishing weekly editions. In 1959, publisher Tom Whitehead Sr. was president of the Texas Press Association. The Brenham Banner Press moved to its current location in 1984 after a period of steady growth; they had occupied their previous location since 1900. Hartman Newspapers, a partnership led by Fred Hartman, sold the paper in 2025 to South Texas News, Inc., a company owned by Albert Reynolds.

== Content ==
The Brenham Banner-Press covers "the latest breaking news, sports, social and community events" in both print and online editions. They also publish letters to the editor, local obituaries, the advice column "Dear Abby," and local classifieds. The front page most often contains local news headlines accompanied by pictures; the national news headlines are often located a few pages into the paper. Every year, the paper hosts the Reader's Choice Awards, asking readers to choose their favorite local business in categories ranging from Favorite Restaurant, to Favorite Auto Shop. In September 2016, the paper discontinued their Monday edition; they currently publish three days a week, on Tuesday, Thursday and on Sunday.
