= Stagecoach Inn of Chappell Hill =

- Stage Coach Inn
- U.S. National Register of Historic Places
- U.S. Historic district – Contributing property
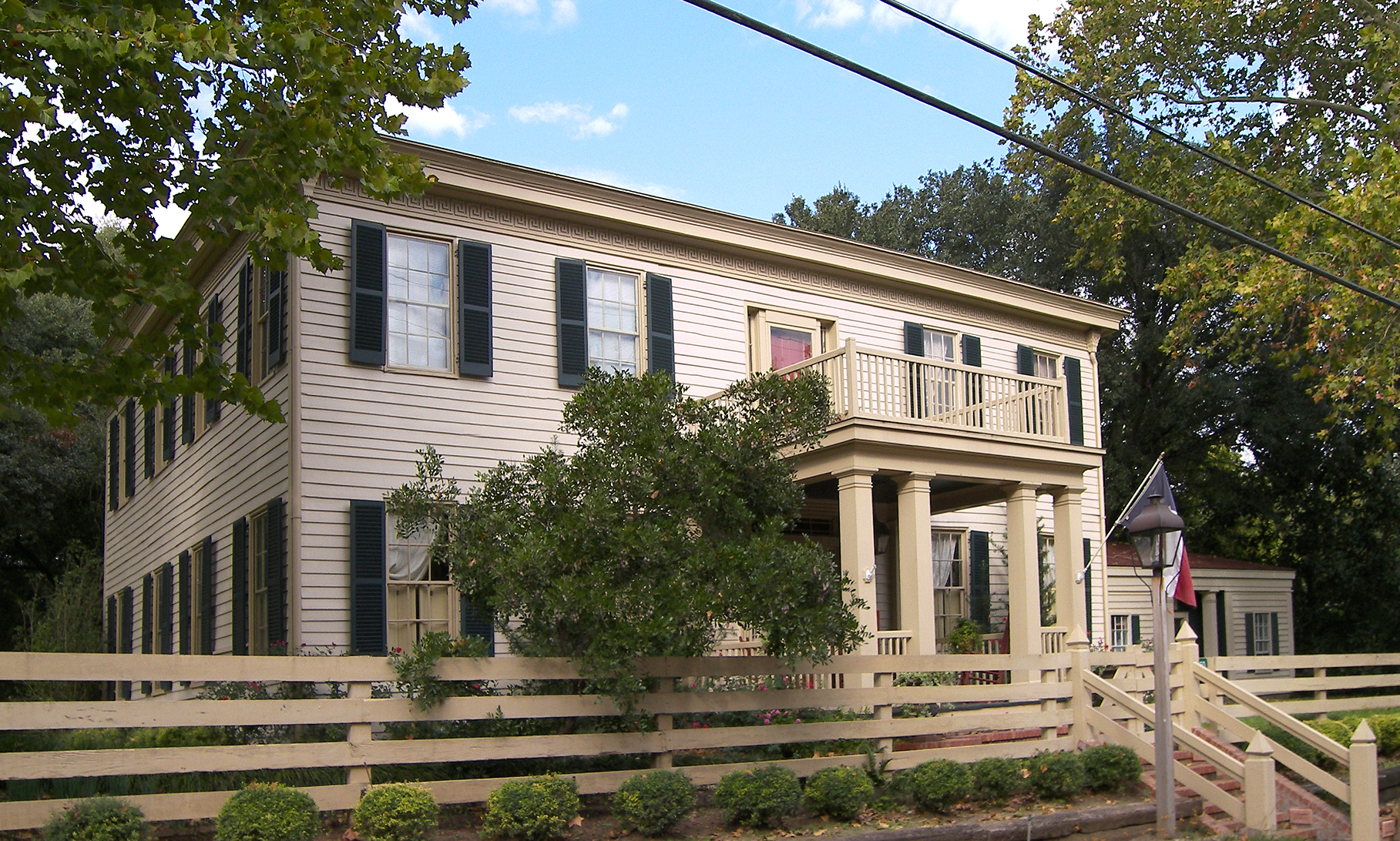
- Stage Coach Inn in 2008

- Location within Texas Location within the United States
- Location: Main & Chestnut Sts., Chappell Hill, Texas
- Coordinates: 30°8′36″N 96°15′26″W
- Area: 1 acre (0.40 ha)
- Built: 1851
- Architectural style: Greek Revival
- Part of: Main Street Historic District (ID85001175)
- MPS: Chappell Hill MRA
- NRHP reference No.: 76002082

Significant dates
- Added to NRHP: December 12, 1976
- Designated CP: May 15, 1985

The Stagecoach Inn of Chappell Hill (also known as the Stage Coach Inn) is a historic stagecoach inn at Main and Chestnut Streets in Chappell Hill, Texas, United States.

It was built in 1850 by Mary Elizabeth Haller (née Hargrove), the founder of Chappell Hill. Mary and her husband Jacob Haller (d. 1853), the town's first postmaster, built the stately 14-room Greek Revival inn along the road from Houston to Austin, where some of Texas' first stagecoach lines, the Smith and Jones, and later the F. P. Sawyers, would stop for the night. Prior to the building's use as a stagecoach stop, it served as a boarding house for students attending college in Chappell Hill. At that time it was called Hargrove House or Hargrove House Hotel.

Charlotte Hargrove, Mary Haller's mother, operated the Inn until 1859; when it was bought by Judge Benjamin Thomas, who operated the Inn until about 1870. John A. Hargrove, Mary's brother, wrote of traveling to "the Cedar breaks" to cut wood for building the inn. Throughout this period, the town of Chappell Hill (which was named after Mary Haller's maternal grandfather) was a part of a booming cotton-farming economy.

As the cotton economy faded after the turn of the 20th century and highways were built bypassing the town, the Inn fell into disrepair, until it was purchased in 1976 by noted Houston architect Harvin C. Moore and his wife Elizabeth. Moore had often seen the Inn while traveling in the 1920s, to and from Austin as a student and member of the Rice University band, and had dreamed of one day bringing it back to life. At the completion of the Moores' restoration, it was listed on the National Register of Historic Places.

The Inn continued to be operated as a bed and breakfast for many years. However, the property was put up for sale in 2014, and the Inn's website is no longer available (late in 2015).

== See also ==
- Fanthorp Inn State Historic Site in Grimes County
- Stagecoach Inn in Bell County
- National Register of Historic Places listings in Washington County, Texas
