= Joshua Soule =

American bishop

- Methodist Episcopal bishop
- Born: August 1, 1781; Bristol (now Bremen), Maine
- Died: March 6, 1867; Nashville, Tennessee

Joshua Soule (August 1, 1781 – March 6, 1867) was an American bishop of the Methodist Episcopal Church (elected in 1824), and then of the Methodist Episcopal Church, South.

== Birth and rebirth ==
Born to Joshua and Mary (Cushman) Soule at Broad Cove in Bristol (now Bremen), Maine, Soule was the seventh child in a Norman-English family. He was the great-great-great-grandson of George Soule, who in 1620 arrived at Plymouth, Massachusetts as a Mayflower Pilgrim, eventually becoming a prominent Duxbury landowner. In the autumn of 1781, not long after this Joshua Soule's birth, the Soules moved to Avon where his father, a former sea captain from Duxbury, was an original settler along the Sandy River. Joshua, the son of Joshua, married Sarah Allen in 1803.

Although his parents were strict Presbyterians, the adolescent Joshua Soule converted to the Methodist Episcopal faith in 1797, joining the New England Annual Conference in 1799.

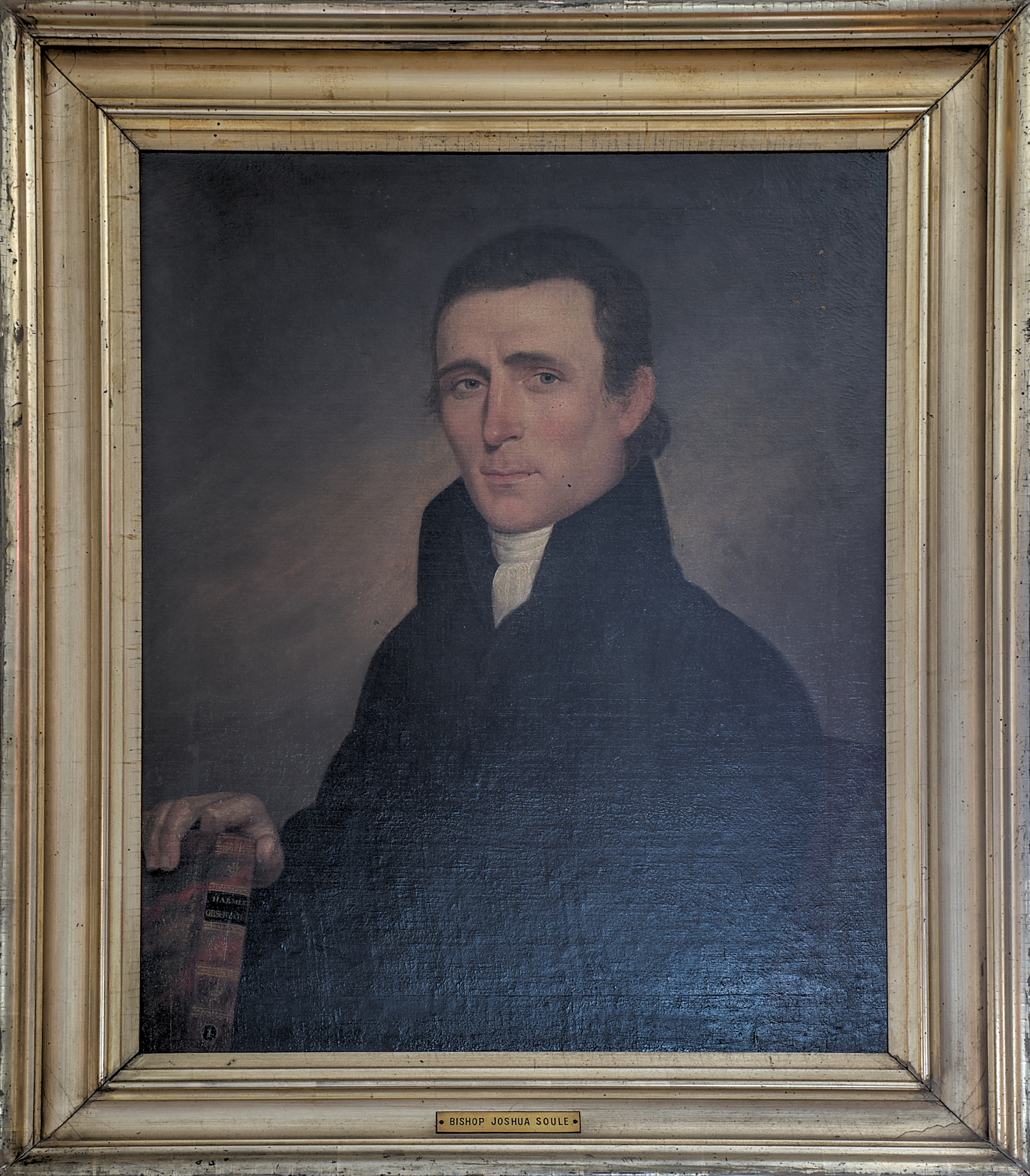
Painting of Soule on display at the World Methodist Museum, Lake Junaluska, NC

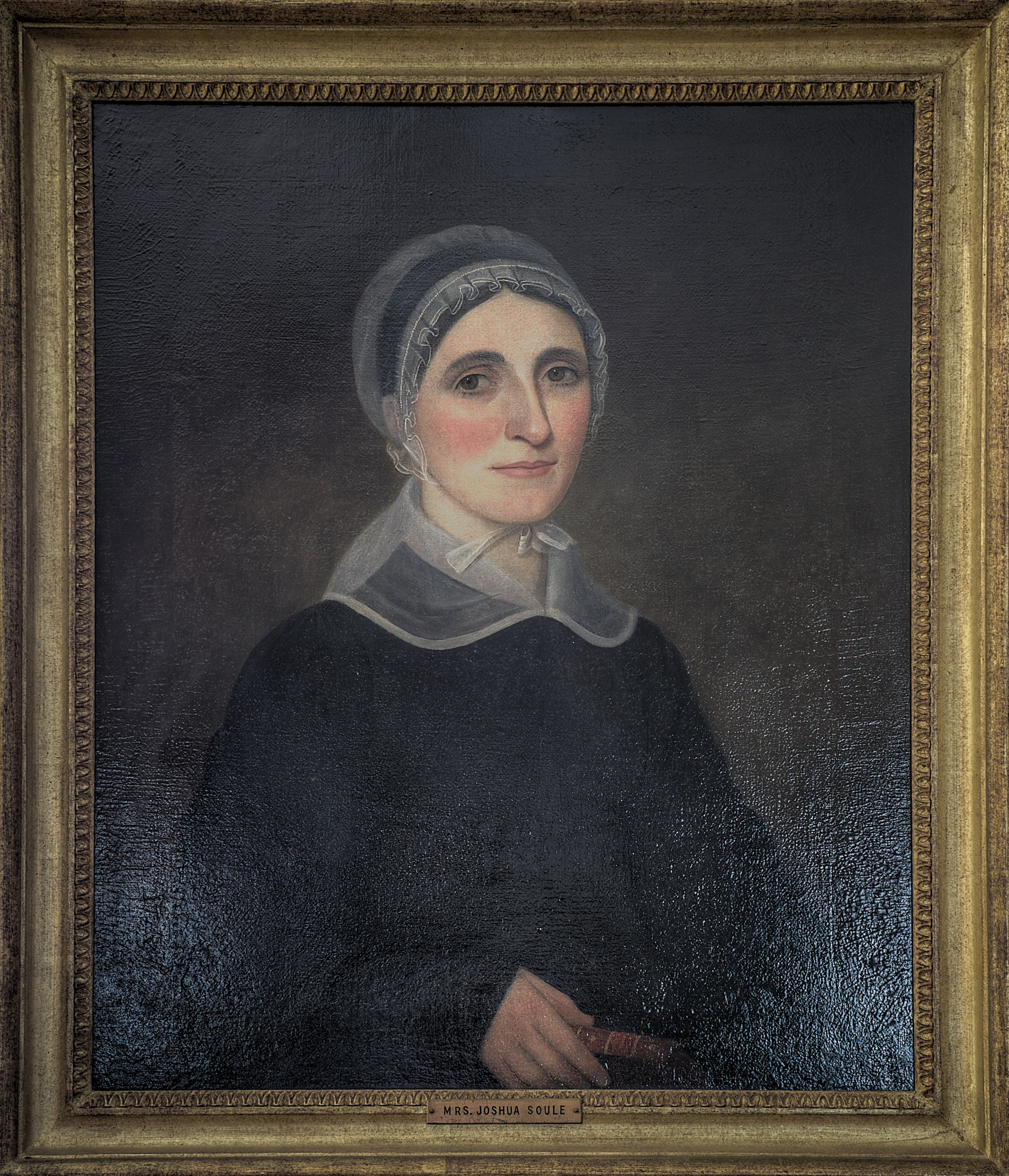
Painting of Sarah Allen Soule (1782 - 1857)

== Ministry ==
He became known as a "Boy Preacher," and an opponent of Calvinism, Unitarianism and Universalism. Tall, dignified and able, Soule was ordained, both deacon and elder, by Bishop Richard Whatcoat. He was appointed a presiding elder at the age of 23, placed in charge of the state of Maine. He also served as a book agent for the M.E. Church. In 1820, he was elected bishop, but declined consecration because the General Conference had adopted a policy he could not approve. He did accept episcopal consecration upon being elected again in 1824.

In the 1844 split of the M. E. Church, he sided with the Methodist Episcopal Church, South. Soule University in Texas was named in his honor in 1856. At that time there was another Methodist institution of higher learning named for Joshua Soule, Soule College in Murfreesboro, Tennessee.

At the age of 85 he was worn out with labor and travel. He died in Nashville in 1867; his body was buried at the old Nashville City Cemetery. In 1876 it was reinterred on the campus of Vanderbilt University.

== Selected writings ==
- is said by Bishop DuBose (Life of Bishop Joshua Soule) to have been "the man who at the age of 27 wrote the Constitution of Methodism."
- is said by Bishop Simpson (Cyclopedia of Methodism) to have been the "author of the plan for a delegated General Conference."
- Sketch of William Beauchamp in Beauchamp's Letters on Itinerancy, published after his death.
- Sermon on Death of McKendree, delivered at General Conference, brochure, 30 pp., 1836.
- Christ the Author of Salvation, Akers, T.P., Sermons for the College, 1851.
- Sermon: Infant Baptism, The Southern Methodist Pulpit, Vol. II, C.F. Deems, Editor, 1849-52.
- Object and Nature of Religious Worship. Discourse at Dedication of John St. Church, N.Y.C., 4 January 1818, published 1857.
- Sermon: "The Perfect Law of Liberty," Methodist Pulpit, South, W.T.Smithson, Editor, 1859.
- Sermon in Sermons for the Home Circle, T.P. Akers, Editor, 1859.
- Religious Experience and Happy Death of Miss Eliza Higgins, 40 pp., n.d.

== Biographies ==
- Stevens, A., Memorials of Methodism, 1848.
- Sketch by L.M.L. in Deems, C.F., Southern Methodist Pulpit, 1849-52.
- Wightman, W.M., Address in Appreciation of Bishop Soule, written manuscript, 1867, in the Methodist Bishops' Collection.
- Sketch by Tefft, B.F., in Flood and Hamilton, Lives of Methodist Bishops, 1882.
- Memorial Sermon, funeral of Joshua Soule, 1867, in McTyeire, H.N., Passing Through the Gates and Other Sermons, 1889.
- Denny, Collins, Joshua Soule, Sketch of Life, in Armstrong, J.E., Old Baltimore Conference, 1907.
- Dubose, H.M., Life of Joshua Soule, 1911.
- Garber, P.N., Young Man from Maine, Epworth Highroad, May 1940.

== See also ==
- List of bishops of the United Methodist Church
- Soule University
