= Fanthorp Inn State Historic Site =

State historic site of Texas, United States

- Fanthorp Inn
- U.S. Historic district – Contributing property
- Texas State Historic Site
- Texas State Antiquities Landmark
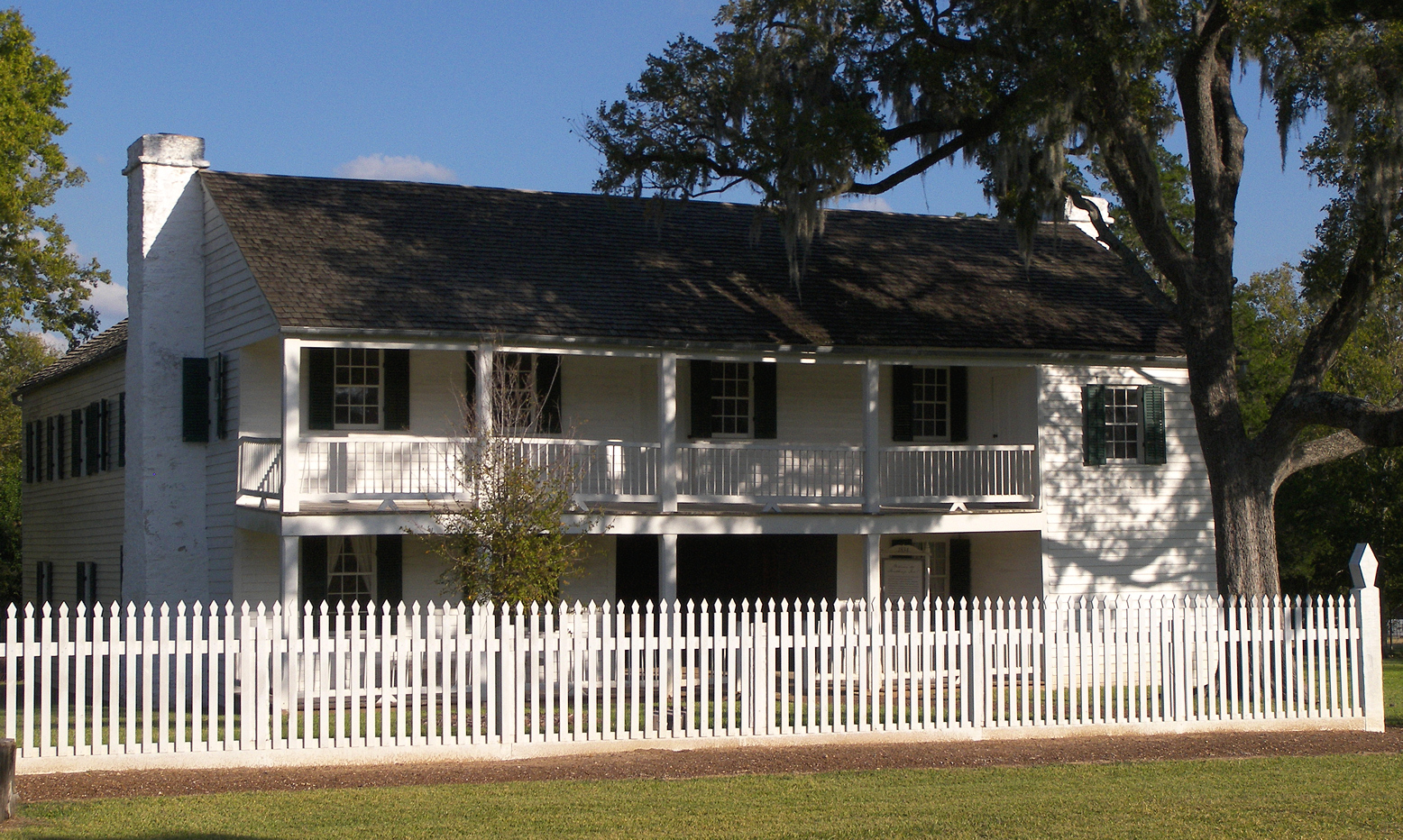
- Fanthorp Inn in 2008
- Location: 579 S. Main St., Anderson, Texas
- Coordinates: 30°28′59″N 95°59′2″W
- Area: 6 acres (2.4 ha)
- Built: 1834
- Built by: Henry Fanthorp
- Architectural style: Log house, Dogtrot house
- Website: Fanthorp Inn State Historic Site
- Part of: Anderson Historic District (ID74002072)
- TSAL No.: 8200000297

Significant dates
- Designated CP: March 15, 1974
- Designated TSHS: October 4, 1987
- Designated TSAL: January 1, 1983

Fanthorp Inn State Historic Site is a historic hotel in Anderson, Texas. The Texas Parks and Wildlife Department acquired the 6-acre (2.4 ha) site by purchase in 1977 from a Fanthorp descendant. Ten years were spent researching and restoring the Inn to its 1850 look. The site was opened to the public on October 4, 1987.

The clapboard-covered log house was built in 1834 by an English immigrant, Henry Fanthorp, as a home for his third wife, Rachel Kennard. He bought 1,100 acres (450 ha) and built his house in 1834 along the road that crossed his land. The building was enlarged in about 1850 to accommodate its usage as a hotel and store.

Henry Fanthorp was appointed postmaster by the Provisional Texas Government in 1835. The building was the first post office in the region. Fanthorp Inn became a well-known stopping place for stagecoaches, travelers, and the community.

On July 3, 1845, Kenneth Lewis Anderson, vice-president of the Republic of Texas died from illness at the Inn while en route home from Washington-on-the-Brazos.

On September 1, 2019, Fanthorp Inn State Historic Site was transferred from the Texas Parks and Wildlife Department to the Texas Historical Commission.

== See also ==
- Log house
- National Register of Historic Places listings in Grimes County, Texas
- Stagecoach Inn in Bell County, Texas
- Stagecoach Inn in Washington County, Texas
