= Mount Carmel, Indiana =

- Town
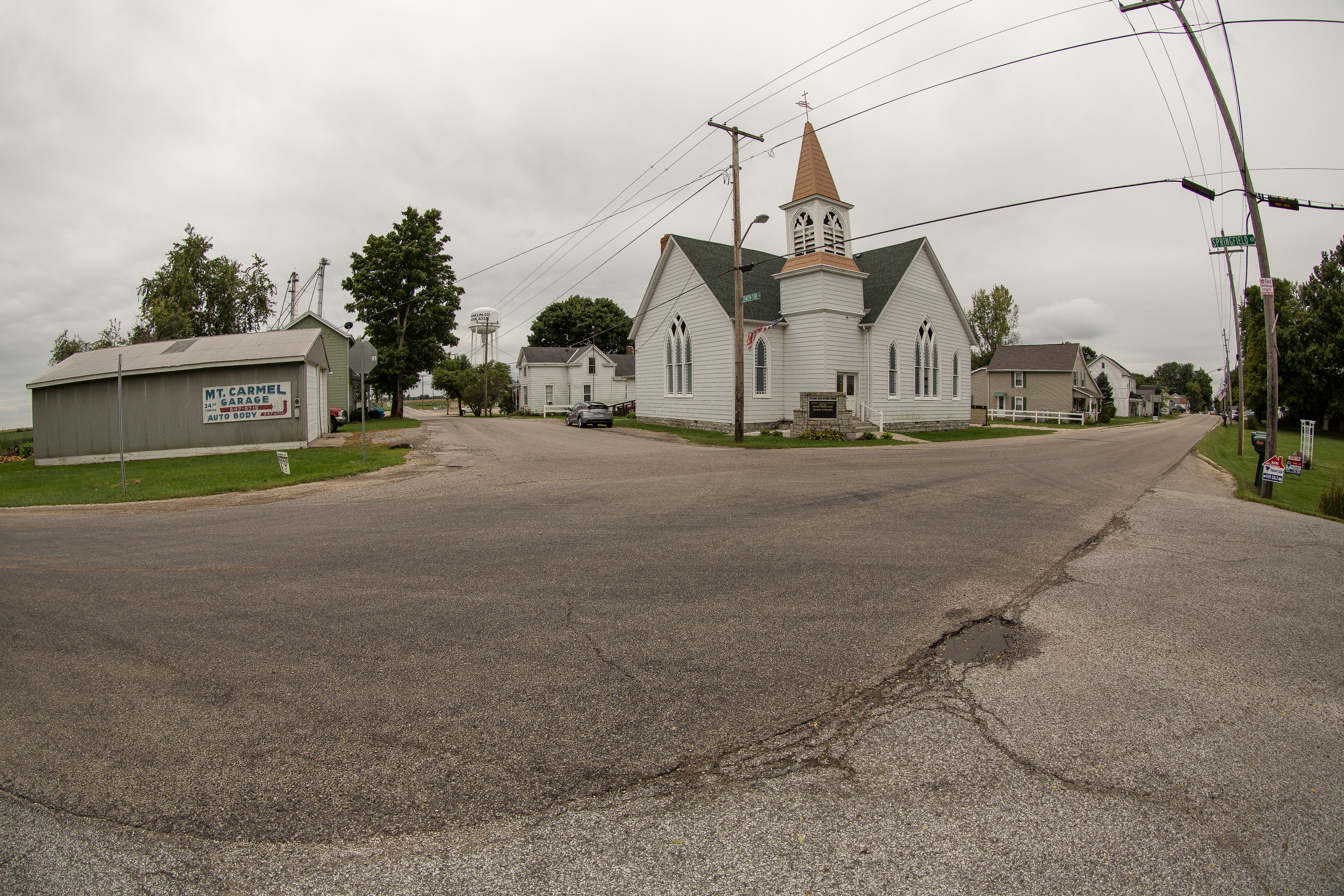

- Location of Mount Carmel in Franklin County, Indiana.
- Coordinates: 39°24′27″N 84°52′29″W
- Country: United States
- State: Indiana
- County: Franklin
- Township: Springfield

Area
  - Total: 0.042 sq mi (0.11 km^{2})
  - Land: 0.042 sq mi (0.11 km^{2})
  - Water: 0 sq mi (0.00 km^{2})
- Elevation: 1,017 ft (310 m)

Population (2020)
  - Total: 76
  - Density: 1,736.7/sq mi (670.56/km^{2})
- Time zone: UTC-5 (Eastern (EST))
  - Summer (DST): UTC-4 (EDT)
- FIPS code: 18-51354
- GNIS feature ID: 2396788

Mount Carmel is a town in Springfield Township, Franklin County, Indiana, United States. As of the 2020 census, Mount Carmel had a population of 76.

== History ==
Mount Carmel was founded in 1837. The town took its name from the Mt. Carmel Presbyterian Church.

A post office was established at Mount Carmel in 1840, and remained in operation until it was discontinued in 1906.

== Geography ==
According to the 2010 census, Mount Carmel has a total area of 0.05 square miles (0.13 km^{2}), all land.

== Demographics ==
Historical population
Census	Pop.	Note	%±
1880	182		—
1890	142		−22.0%
1900	153		7.7%
1910	142		−7.2%
1920	127		−10.6%
1930	150		18.1%
1940	120		−20.0%
1950	134		11.7%
1960	142		6.0%
1970	128		−9.9%
1980	151		18.0%
1990	108		−28.5%
2000	106		−1.9%
2010	86		−18.9%
2020	76		−11.6%
U.S. Decennial Census

=== 2010 census ===
As of the census of 2010, there were 86 people, 31 households, and 25 families living in the town. The population density was 1,720.0 inhabitants per square mile (664.1/km^{2}). There were 32 housing units at an average density of 640.0 per square mile (247.1/km^{2}). The racial makeup of the town was 97.7% White and 2.3% from two or more races.

There were 31 households, of which 45.2% had children under the age of 18 living with them, 54.8% were married couples living together, 22.6% had a female householder with no husband present, 3.2% had a male householder with no wife present, and 19.4% were non-families. 16.1% of all households were made up of individuals, and 6.4% had someone living alone who was 65 years of age or older. The average household size was 2.77 and the average family size was 2.96.

The median age in the town was 35 years. 31.4% of residents were under the age of 18; 11.7% were between the ages of 18 and 24; 23.3% were from 25 to 44; 22.1% were from 45 to 64; and 11.6% were 65 years of age or older. The gender makeup of the town was 45.3% male and 54.7% female.

=== 2000 census ===
As of the census of 2000, there were 106 people, 39 households, and 23 families living in the town. The population density was 2,526.0 inhabitants per square mile (975.3/km^{2}). There were 41 housing units at an average density of 977.0 per square mile (377.2/km^{2}). The racial makeup of the town was 99.06% White and 0.94% African American.

There were 39 households, out of which 33.3% had children under the age of 18 living with them, 48.7% were married couples living together, 10.3% had a female householder with no husband present, and 38.5% were non-families. 30.8% of all households were made up of individuals, and 15.4% had someone living alone who was 65 years of age or older. The average household size was 2.72 and the average family size was 3.42.

In the town, the population was spread out, with 28.3% under the age of 18, 18.9% from 18 to 24, 22.6% from 25 to 44, 17.9% from 45 to 64, and 12.3% who were 65 years of age or older. The median age was 28 years. For every 100 females, there were 82.8 males. For every 100 females age 18 and over, there were 90.0 males.

The median income for a household in the town was $25,000, and the median income for a family was $31,250. Males had a median income of $23,125 versus $17,250 for females. The per capita income for the town was $9,586. There were 28.1% of families and 27.0% of the population living below the poverty line, including 25.0% of under eighteens and 21.4% of those over 64.

== Notable people ==
- Mary Louisa Chitwood (1832–1855), writer
