= Hosea Garrett =

American clergyman, philanthropist and university administrator

- Born: November 26, 1800; Gray Court, Laurens County, South Carolina
- Died: September 4, 1888 (aged 87); Brenham, Washington County, Texas
- Spouse: Mary "Polly" Garrett
- Children: 5
- Parents: John Garrett; Sarah Mauldin

Ecclesiastical career
- Religion: Southern Baptist Convention
- Ordained: April 26, 1835
- Offices held: Member of the Board of Trustees of Baylor University; President of the Board of Trustees of Baylor University
- Title: President (Pro Tem) of Baylor University; President of the Baptist State Convention of Texas; Vice President of the Southern Baptist Convention

Hosea Garrett (November 26, 1800 – September 4, 1888) was an American clergyman, philanthropist, and university administrator. He is primarily known as one of the founders of Baylor University, where he was elected the first president pro tem of the university. He served as a member of the board of trustees for 42 years and president of the board of trustees for 35 years, as well as president of the Baptist State Convention of Texas, and vice president of the Southern Baptist Convention.

== Early life ==
Hosea Garrett was born on November 26, 1800, in Gray Court, Laurens County, South Carolina. He was the son of John and Sarah (née Mauldin) Garrett. He was married three times. He married his first wife, Mary "Polly" Garrett on November 14, 1819, at the Warrior Creek Baptist Church in Gray Court. They had five children, including three daughters and two sons. She died on November 14, 1861, in Chappell Hill, Texas, from breast cancer. On September 9, 1862, he married Nancy Banks, widow of General Thomas D. Wooldridge. She died on October 17, 1879, in Chappell Hill. On May 20, 1880, Garrett married Mary Herzog. This marriage lasted until his death on September 4, 1888, following injuries incurred when he was thrown by a horse. He is buried in Prairie Lea Cemetery in Brenham, Washington County, Texas.

== Ministry background ==
Garrett was raised in a religious home practicing the Baptist faith. While he was not formally educated, he taught himself to read. He was ordained as a Baptist preacher in 1834 at Warrior Creek Baptist Church in Gray Court and became pastor of the local church two years later.

Baptist State Convention

In 1842, he moved with his family to Texas, where he lived in the Austin area alongside the Colorado River. He worked as both a farmer and Baptist preacher in Chappell Hill for 46 years. During this time, he pastored the Providence Baptist Church and established several Baptist congregations throughout Texas and became prominent in the leadership of the denominational activities. In 1857, he was appointed as the vice president of the Baptist State Convention of Texas. Three years later, he was named as the president of the organization.

Baylor University

On May 15, 1845, Hosea Garrett was elected as the initial President Pro Tempore of Baylor University at the board's first organizational meeting in Independence, Texas. On May 1, 1847, after Henry Lee Graves was officially installed as the university's first president, Garrett was named as a member of the board of trustees. A year later, in June 1848, he was selected as president of the board of trustees, after the death of the previous president, William Tryon, who had died due to yellow fever. He served in this capacity until February 1868, when he left due to health problems. After returning to the university in June 1870, he was again installed as president of the board, holding this role until 1886, when Baylor University moved to Waco.

As of 2013, Hosea Garrett has held the title of chairman of the board of trustees longer than anyone in the history of the school. Baylor cofounder Rufus Burleson called him "a monument of what uneducated, strong common sense, incorrigible honesty and humble piety can attain", while the United States Department of Education has stated of Garrett that "no man ever contributed more of his time, his money, and his wisdom to the success of Baylor University."
