= Mary Louisa Chitwood =

American poet

- Born: 29 October 1832
- Died: 19 December 1855 (aged 23)
- Occupation: Writer

Mary Louisa Chitwood (October 29, 1832 – December 19, 1855) was an American writer of poetry and prose. She wrote for the Louisville Journal, The Ladies' Repository, The Genius of the West, Arthur's Home Gazette, the Odd-Fellow's Ark, and other papers and magazines. A contemporary of Sarah T. Bolton, Chitwood was befriended by George D. Prentice, who was her literary counselor.

== Early life and education ==
Mary Louisa Chitwood was born on October 29, 1832, on a farm near the village of Mount Carmel, Franklin County, Indiana. Although she died before she was 23 years of age, she left more than 1,000 poems. Her earliest education was at the Center School House. Here, she came under the influence of the teacher, George A. Chase, who had recently relocated from the East Coast. Early recognizing her unusual gifts and ability, he encouraged her writing. For a short time, she was his assistant teacher.

The mother, Mary A. Tucker, wrote some verses that were published in the country newspapers. Aside from this companionship, Chitwood's communication with other writers was through the correspondence associated with the publication of her poems.

== Career ==
Her first published poem appeared in the Brookville American when she was 12 years of age, and received complimentary remarks from the editor. At least one-third of her poems were never published, and those that were published were selected and edited by Prentice, the editor of the Louisville Courier. Prentice issued this volume two years after her death and since that time, other editions were printed. In addition to her poetry, Chitwood wrote prose that many felt was equal or superior to her poetry. Both her prose and poetry carry a strain of sadness that conveys the idea that there was something she longed for but never received.

Chitwood was a regular contributor to The Ladies' Repository. She was also the assistant editor of The Ladies’ Temperance Wreath, published at Connersville, which she co-founded with Lavinia Brownlee. She had a horror of drunkenness and some of her strongest poems were on that subject. She had strong convictions on slavery and it has been said that the poem written just before her death in 1855, “Ode to the New Year,” found its way into every abolition paper in England and America. Her poems were reprinted widely throughout the US in the papers, some appeared in various school readers, some were set to music, and hundreds were recited from the platform and pulpit.

== Personal life ==
Chitwood lived her entire life in Mount Carmel. She died there 19 December 1855 and is buried in South Park cemetery in Greensburg.
