= George D. Prentice =

American newspaper editor

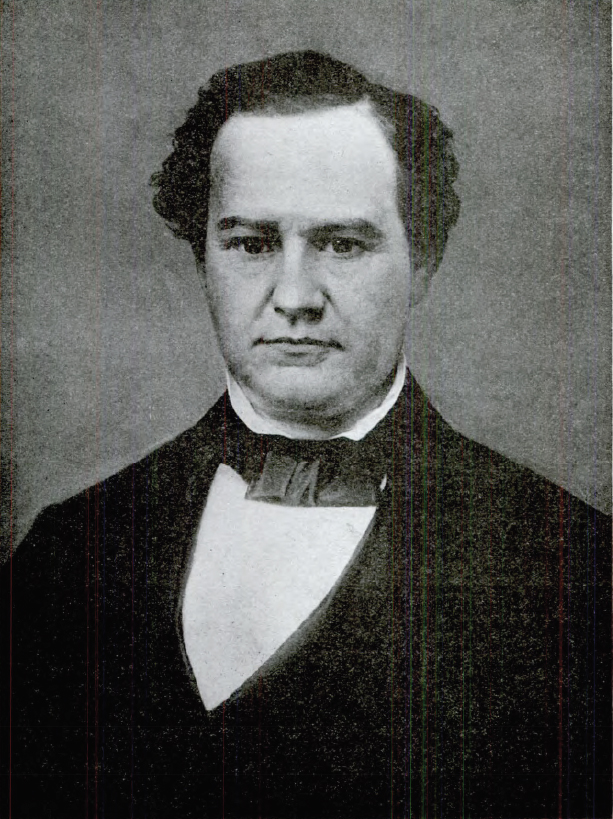
- Born: George Dennison Prentice; December 18, 1802; Preston, Connecticut, U.S.
- Died: January 22, 1870 (aged 67); Jefferson County, Kentucky, U.S.
- Resting place: Cave Hill Cemetery; Louisville, Kentucky, U.S.
- Occupation: Newspaper editor
- Political party: Whig; Know-Nothing Party; Constitutional Union Party
- Spouse: Harriet Benham (m. 1835)

George Dennison Prentice (December 18, 1802 – January 22, 1870) was an American newspaper editor, writer and poet who built the Louisville Journal into a major newspaper in Louisville, Kentucky, and the Ohio River Valley, in part by the virulence and satire in its editorials, which some blamed for a bloody election day riot in 1855. A slaveholder, Prentice initially supported Unionist candidate John Bell in the 1860 U.S. presidential election, and after the American Civil War, he urged Kentucky to remain neutral. Both of his sons joined the Confederate States Army, one dying in 1862, and Prentice's editorials lampooned Kentucky's military governor, Union General Stephen G. Burbridge. Prentice later opposed Congressional Reconstruction. He wrote a biography of Henry Clay published in 1831, an 1836 poem published in the McGuffey Readers, and a collection of his humorous essays was published in 1859 and revised after his death.

== Early and family life ==
Prentice was born in New London County, Connecticut, (Note: Appleton's Cyclopedia names the town as Preston, Connecticut) in 1802 to farmer Rufus Prentice and his wife, the former Sarah Stanton. George was a child prodigy, learning to read before he was four, and mastering Latin and Greek by the time he was fourteen. He was the principal of a public school at age 15.

He left that job and moved to Rhode Island to attend Brown University, graduating at the head of his class in 1823. He returned to his home state to read law in Canterbury, Windham County, Connecticut. Although he joined the Connecticut bar in 1827, his legal practice did not thrive.

On August 18, 1835, Prentice married Harriet Benham (1820–1868), daughter of Louisville, Kentucky, attorney Joseph Benham and a graduate of Nazareth College in Bardstown, Kentucky. She was an accomplished musician and for 20 years choir director for Christ Church in Louisville. Although their children Mary Louise and George Benham died young, William Courtland Prentice (1837–1862) and Clarence Joseph Prentice (1839–1873) reached adulthood. In the 1840 census, their 12-person household included seven slaves (some infants). Prentice owned 5 slaves, all adults, in 1850, and four slaves (including an eight-year-old boy) in 1860.

== Career ==
Prentice moved to Hartford and became acting editor of the Connecticut Mirror in 1827. He became editor of The New-England Weekly Review in 1828.

Invited to come to Kentucky to write a campaign biography of Henry Clay, Prentice ended up staying in Louisville. Although the biography sold 20,000 copies (and Clay remained one of Kentucky's U.S. Senators), Prentice received no money for the book because the Hartford publisher went bankrupt. Henry Clay also never became President of the United States as he had dreamed, losing in 1832 as he had in 1824 and would again in 1844. Meanwhile, Prentice accepted an offer to co-found the Louisville Journal newspaper in 1830, with the twin goals of further promoting Henry Clay, and rivaling the then-dominant Louisville Public Advertiser. Prentice soon found himself in an editorial feud with Advertiser publisher Shadrack Penn, which continued until Penn left the city in 1841.

Prentice's biting editorials and the savage wit of his replies to detractors helped make the Journal the most widely circulated newspaper in western America in the next four decades. Prentice was also a poet, whose best-known poem, "The Closing Year" (written on New Year's Eve 1836) would be included in one of McGuffey's Readers. He also befriended and was a mentor to poet Mary Louisa Chitwood (1832–1855).

Prentice became known for militant editorials before elections, which varied little over the next 25 years despite his changing party affiliation. He initially promoted the Whig Party. He became a party leader, attended various national conventions and also visited Washington D.C. In mid-1855, as the party disintegrated, Prentice editorialized in support of the Know-Nothing party and the pro-slavery, anti-Catholic and anti-foreigner movement that reached a hysterical level in the 1850s in many parts of the nation. In Louisville, this culminated in the Bloody Monday riot of August 6, 1855, in which 22 people were killed as mobs tried to prevent Irish and German citizens from voting on election day. Days before, Prentice had editorialized against the "most pestilent influence of the foreign swarms" loyal to a pope he called "an inflated Italian despot who keeps people kissing his toes all day." According to Archbishop John Lancaster Spalding, Prentice later publicly expressed regret over his role in the riots.

On July 21, 1857, Prentice engaged in a pistol duel with Reuben T. Durrett over statements made between their two rival newspapers. Prentice also contributed columns to the New York Ledger for several years, and in 1859, a New York firm published Prenticeana: or wit and humor, which would be republished shortly after his death.

== Civil War and aftermath ==
Prentice supported the Union in the 1850s and the Constitutional Union Party in 1860, but disagreed with many of President Lincoln's policies during the Civil War, especially the decision to emancipate slaves. In 1861 Prentice joined a group that urged Kentucky not to secede from the Union but instead establish itself as a neutral party in the war. Nonetheless, Louisville was occupied by Union troops for almost the entire war, and resentment seethed. Both Prentice's sons joined the Confederate army, and the elder, William, died September 21, 1862 (shortly after the Battle of Antietam and as Union troops massed in Louisville to attack General Braxton Bragg's forces). His son Clarence rose to the rank of Major in Dortch's 2nd battalion, Kentucky Cavalry. In 1864 Prentice created the famous "Sue Mundy" guerrilla character to mock Union General Stephen G. Burbridge, military commander of Kentucky.

After the war Prentice opposed many of the policies of Reconstruction, as did the city's other major editor, Walter N. Haldeman of the Louisville Courier, which Union forces had seized and shut in September 1861 because of Haldeman's Confederate sympathies (he moved to Nashville, Tennessee, and then Madison, Georgia, and returned to Louisville a hero after the war's end). Prentice's paper was one of the few that criticized federal rebuilding policies of the time. Prentice remained as editor of the paper during and after the 1868 merger of the Louisville Courier, Louisville Journal and Louisville Democrat that created The Courier-Journal, although he soon died and Haldeman's protege and dedicated Confederate veteran Henry Watterson became editor and would write and speak widely about his Southern viewpoint (although born in Washington DC as the son of a Tennessee Congressman).

== Death and legacy ==
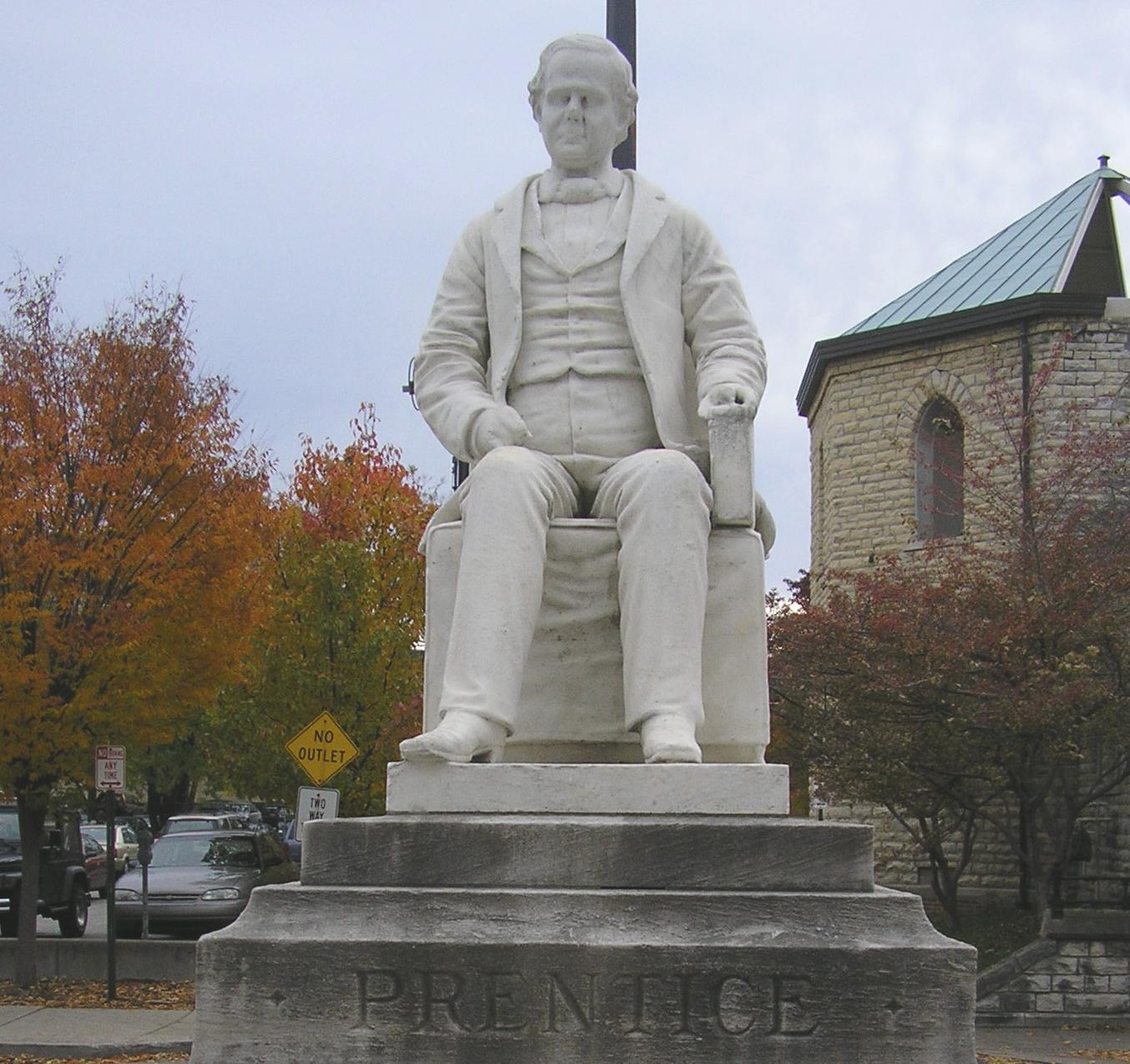
1912 Statue of Prentice in Louisville

He died of influenza on January 22, 1870, less than two years after his wife, and was buried in Cave Hill Cemetery.

His successor editor at the Louisville Courier-Journal delivered and printed a eulogy, and a Philadelphia publisher republished the 1859 essay collection in 1870 with a new preface. Although the newspaper survives to this day, Prentice's legacy became generally unfavorable over time, with a 2005 article recalling the Bloody Monday riot, in which Keith Runyon, the paper's Forum editor and editor of a 1993 retrospective of the paper's 125-year history, referred to Prentice's "raw bigotry".

A statue of Prentice by Alex Bouly was completed in 1875. It was originally displayed at the Courier-Journal building in Louisville, Kentucky, but was moved in 1914 to the front of the Louisville Free Public Library's main branch.

It has been a source of occasional controversy, due to Prentice's famous anti-Catholic and anti-immigrant rhetoric. A compromise reached at one point involved the city placing a new plaque for the statue, describing Prentice's "tarnished legacy." The statue was removed and placed into storage in 2018.

A Liberty ship, the SS George D. Prentice, was launched in 1943 and remained in service until 1969.

== See also ==
- Mary Louisa Chitwood
- Louisville in the American Civil War
