= Martin Ruter =

American Methodist minister (1785–1838)

Martin Henry Ruter
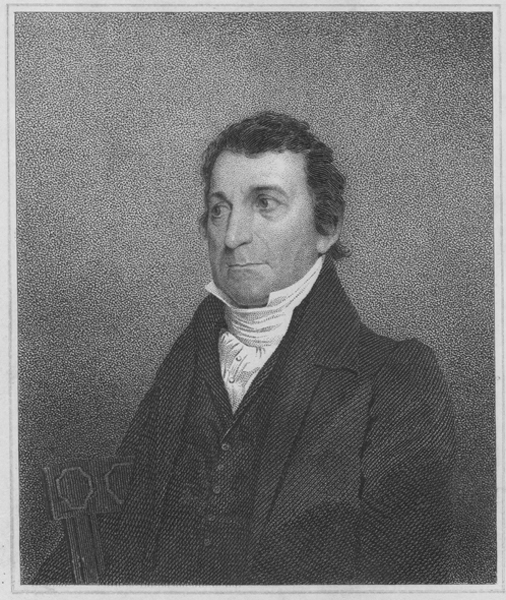
- Born: April 3, 1785; Charlton, Massachusetts, United States
- Died: May 16, 1838; Washington-on-the-Brazos, Republic of Texas
- Occupations: Minister, missionary, educator
- Relatives: Rebecca Ruter Springer, Amanda Ruter Dufour (nieces)

Martin Ruter (April 3, 1785 - May 16, 1838) was a Methodist minister, missionary and educator.

The son of a blacksmith, Ruter was born in Massachusetts but moved with his family to Vermont at an early age. Largely self-educated, he read English literature and taught himself Hebrew, Greek, Latin, and French. After being called into the ministry, he joined the New York Conference of the Methodist Episcopal Church in 1801 and received his elder's orders from Bishop Francis Asbury in 1805.

== Ministry ==
The early years of Ruter's ministerial career were spent in New Hampshire. There were few Methodists in New England at that time, forcing ministers like Ruter to ride a large circuit. In 1811 he was sent to Portland, Maine, and then on to North Yarmouth. In 1815 he was stationed in Salisbury, Massachusetts, for a time and then sent to Montreal, Canada. There he learned French while also becoming a pupil of a rabbi and studying Hebrew. By 1817, Ruter was back in the United States and preaching in Philadelphia. The following year, Asbury College in Baltimore granted him a Master of Arts degree.

== Career in education ==
In his thirties, Ruter was hired as the first principal of Newmarket Academy in New Hampshire, and in 1821 was offered a professorship of Oriental Literature at Cincinnati College. The following year, he helped found Augusta College in Kentucky and was its first president. In recognition of his contributions to education, Transylvania College, Lexington, Kentucky, awarded Ruter a Doctor of Divinity degree in 1822.

In 1820 the General Conference chose Ruter to establish a new branch of the Methodist Book Concern in Cincinnati. During his eight years as book agent, he edited or wrote more than a dozen books, the most influential of which, History of the Christian Church (1832), was required reading for Methodist preachers for several decades. At his death, he left unfinished a "Plea for Africa as a Field for Missionary Labor" and a "Life of Bishop Asbury."

In 1833, Ruter moved back east to Meadville, Pennsylvania, to take over as president of Allegheny College. He remained in that position until 1837.

== Texas ==
In May 1836 Ruter volunteered for missionary service in the new Republic of Texas. Within a year the Methodist Missionary Society established the Texas Mission, and the bishops appointed Ruter superintendent. He resigned the presidency of Allegheny College and moved with his family to New Albany, Indiana, where two of his brothers resided, in the summer of 1837. Taking a large supply of bibles, hymnals, and Sunday school books, he headed for Texas in early November with David Ayres as his companion and guide. On November 23, 1837, they crossed the Sabine River at Gaines Ferry, and entered Texas. In the following weeks, Ruter preached at various locations including Nacogdoches and Washington-on-the-Brazos. By mid-December he was in Houston, where he preached in Congress Hall. He also met with President Sam Houston, Vice President Mirabeau Lamar and other leaders and gained their support for creating an institution of higher learning. Ruter received pledges from several men willing to donate land and he drew up articles of a charter to be presented to the next session of the Texas Congress. The site apparently most favored for a school was at Bastrop or near Chappell Hill.

In the meantime, Ruter traveled constantly. In April, when Ruter attempted a journey to the East to raise money for the mission and to bring his family to Texas, he became ill and was forced to return to Washington-on-the-Brazos. He died there on May 16, 1838, apparently of typhoid fever complicated by pneumonia. His vision was realized in 1840 with the founding of Rutersville College and the formation of the Texas Conference of the Methodist Episcopal Church.

In 1901, local Methodist leaders, with the support of Bishop Willard Francis Mallalieu, relocated Martin Ruter's remains to Navasota, Texas and erected a granite monument.

Ruter Hall, a dormitory at Southwestern University in Georgetown, Texas, was named in his honor.

== Personal life ==
In 1805, Ruter married Sybil Robertson of Chesterfield, New Hampshire. She died just three years after marrying and neither of the couple's two offspring survived childhood. In 1810, Ruter married Ruth Young of Concord, New Hampshire. They had eight children, one of whom, Augustus Ruter, followed in his father's footsteps and was a professor of languages at both Allegheny College and Transylvania University. Two other sons, Philander and Marcellus, also became Methodist ministers.

Martin Ruter's youngest brother, Calvin W. Ruter, was a Methodist minister in Indiana and considered a founding father of DePauw University.
