= Chappell Hill, Texas =

- unincorporated community
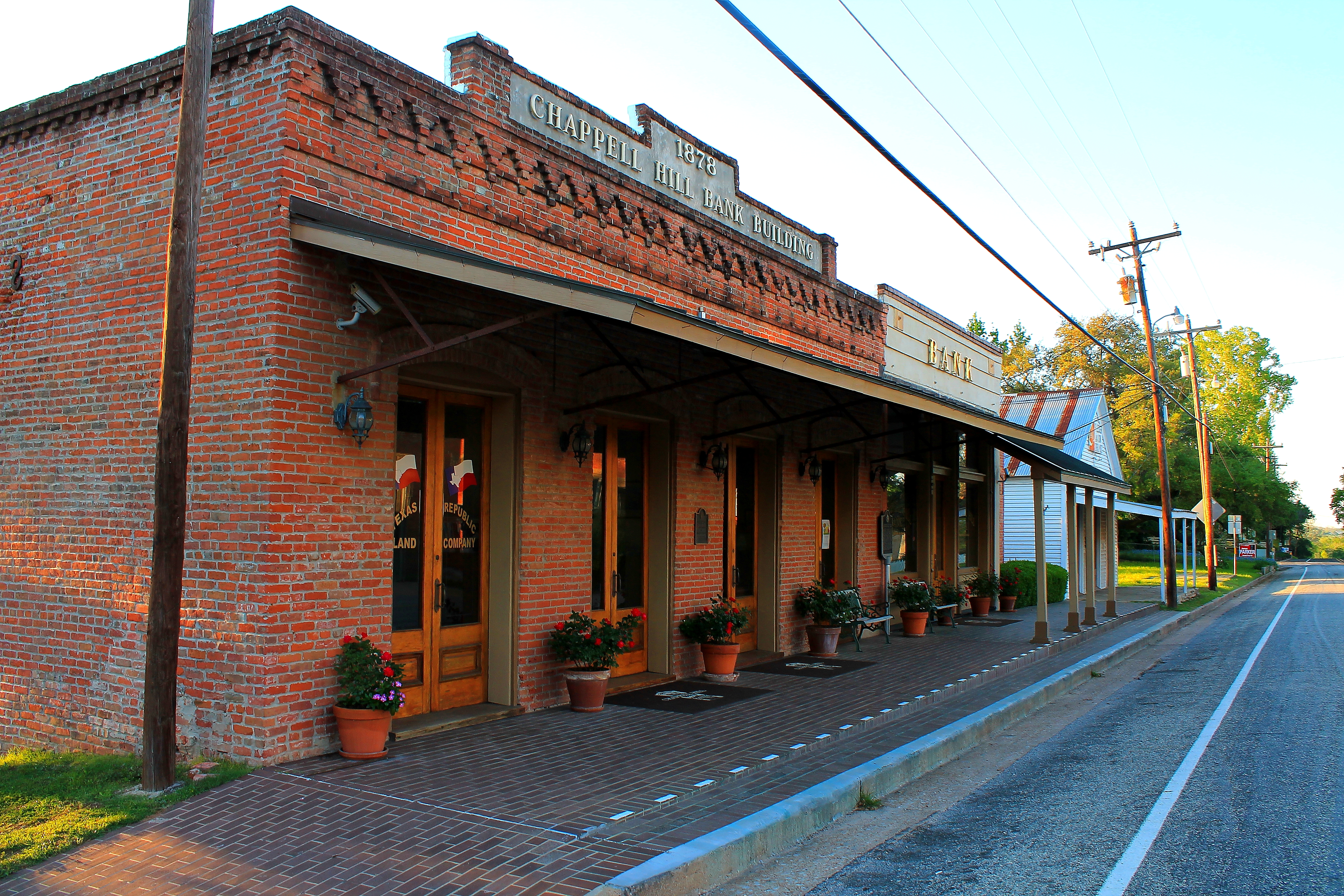

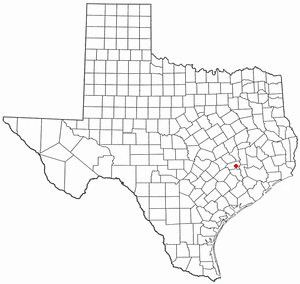
- Location of Chappell Hill, Texas
- Coordinates: 30°08′34″N 96°15′25″W
- Country: United States
- State: Texas
- County: Washington

Area
  - Water: 0 sq mi (0.0 km^{2})
- Elevation: 299 ft (91 m)

Population (2000)
  - Total: 600
- Time zone: UTC-6 (Central (CST))
  - Summer (DST): UTC-5 (CDT)
- ZIP code: 77426
- Area code: 979
- GNIS feature ID: 1332674

Chappell Hill is an unincorporated community in the eastern portion of Washington County, Texas, United States. It is located inside Stephen F. Austin's original colony, and the land is some of the oldest Anglo-settled in the state. According to the Handbook of Texas, the community had a population of 600 in 2000. It is located within the Greater Houston metropolitan area. It is home to numerous Texas historic sites and is 17 miles Southwest from the Washington on the Brazos State Historic Site.

== Geography ==
Chappell Hill is located at the junction of US Route 290 and Farm to Market Roads 1155 and 2447. Chappell Hill is located within the Brazos River watershed. The area is part of the Gulf Coastal Plain, and the terrain is rolling hills. The community is located 10 mi (16 km) east of Brenham, 98 mi (158 km) east of Austin, 12 mi (19 km) west of Hempstead, and 63 mi (101 km) northwest of Houston.

== History ==
=== 19th century ===
The town was established in 1849 by Mary Elizabeth Haller, who founded the town on 100 acres (0.40 km^{2}) of land she bought and having opened a post office two years earlier. She then named the town after her maternal grandfather Robert Wooding Chappell. The area around the town was settled by planters from the Deep South and, thanks to the fertile soil of the Brazos River valley, cotton became the area's main crop.

Jacob Haller and Mary built in 1850 a large home that served as a boarding house and then became the Stage Coach Inn, which Mary or her mother Charlotte Hargrove operated until 1859, continuing under new ownership until 1871. Because the inn was about halfway between Houston and Austin, it was a convenient stopover for travelers along the two major stagecoach lines.

Before the Civil War, the population reached a maximum of about 3,000 people; at that time, San Antonio and Galveston were the largest towns at around 8,000 people. A sawmill, a railroad line, five churches, and a Masonic Lodge were built in the area.

The town was incorporated in 1856.

The men of Chappell Hill formed part of the First Texas Lancers cavalry regiment during the Civil War and fought in Missouri, Louisiana, and Arkansas. Men from Chappell Hill served in numerous renowned Confederate units, including the Texas Brigade and Terry's Texas Rangers, and saw action in most of the major engagements of the Civil War. In addition, the Soule University building was used as a field hospital.

In 1867, a yellow fever epidemic decimated the town and other southeast Texas towns. Many men who survived combat lost their lives just two years after the war's end. The town never recovered and faded into obscurity. Polish immigrants, mostly from the German partition, began to appear in the 1870s, and the area was re-settled, though it did not reach the status[?] of before. In 1889, Father Grabinger from Brenham's St. Mary's established St. Stanislaus Roman Catholic Church. Denizens of Polish ancestry can still be found in the area surrounding the church and throughout Washington and Austin counties.

=== 20th and 21st centuries ===
In 1933, the Farmers Bank of Chappell Hill refused to close its doors when President Franklin D. Roosevelt ordered a March 6 to March 10 banking freeze. The owner of the bank took out an ad in a Boston newspaper protesting the order.

Chappell Hill today has a tourist economy, attracting visitors with its restored homes, the Bluebonnet Festival, its own sausage company, its Independence Day parade, a Scarecrow Festival, and a museum. The Main Street Historic District is listed on the National Register of Historic Places. Chappell Hill remains one of the best historically preserved towns in Texas. In 1997, the Texas Legislature designated the Chappell Hill Bluebonnet Festival as the official "Bluebonnet Festival of Texas".

On May 10, 2008, an election was held to incorporate Chappell Hill into its own town government. 201 ballots were cast out of a possible 297 eligible voters. Incorporation was rejected by almost 3 to 1 voters: 148 votes against and just 53 for. 90 votes were cast in the mayoral poll; Julie Edwards received 55 votes and Mary Tom Middlebrooks won 35. For the two unopposed council positions, Travis Bevers received 62 votes while Larry C. Wiese received 60. The results of these contests were immediately invalidated by the anti-incorporation outcome.

The Brenham Banner-Press occasionally covers the news in Chappell Hill.

== Buildings on the National Register of Historic Places ==
- Chappell Hill Circulating Library
- Chappell Hill Methodist Episcopal Church
- Chappell Hill Public School and Chappell Hill Female College Bell
- Isaac Applewhite House
- Main Street Historic District (Chappell Hill, Texas)
- Stage Coach Inn
- Routt-Crockett House

== Demographics ==
As of the 2000 U.S. Census, approximately 600 people were living in the town of Chappell Hill itself.

1,319 people, 532 households, and 377 families live in the Chappell Hill ZIP code area (77426). Of the 1,319 people, 925 are white, 343 are black, and 34 are of another race. Most people are Roman Catholic, Methodist, or Southern Baptist in faith.

== Education ==
Chappell Hill's first school was established in 1850.Today, the community is served by the Brenham Independent School District.

== Notable people ==
- Susan Isabella Travis, daughter of William B. Travis, married a planter from Chappell Hill.
- James P. Buchanan, U.S. Representative from the 10th district of Texas.
- Martin Ruter developed land for a school in the community.
- Joe Routt, American football player and World War II soldier, was born in Chappell Hill.
- Hosea Garrett, clergyman, philanthropist, and university administrator.
- Rodney Brown, track and field specializing in the discus throw.
- Alonzo Sledge, preacher and Texas State Representative, was born here.

== See also ==
- National Register of Historic Places listings in Washington County, Texas
