= Louise Martin =

Louise Martin may refer to:

- Louise Martin (photographer) (1911–1995), American photographer
- Louise Martin (sports administrator) (born 1946), Scottish sports administrator

== See also ==
- Louisa Martin (1865–1941), Irish tennis player
