= Travis Broesche =

American architect

Travis Broesche (May 6, 1911 – August 22, 2003) was an architect who practiced in Houston and Brenham, Texas. His primary areas of work were churches, schools, hospitals, and public buildings. Buildings he designed are located throughout south, central, and east Texas. At least two of his works are listed on the National Register of Historic Places.

He was born May 6, 1911, in Ellinger, Texas and died August 22, 2003, in Brenham, Texas.

His works include:

- Burton High School, Burton, Texas, NRHP-listed
- Washington County Courthouse (Brenham, Texas), NRHP-listed
- Brenham City Hall
- City of Somerville Stone Gymnasium and Football Stadium with Seating and Fence
