= Brenham Heritage Museum =

Museum in Brenham, Texas

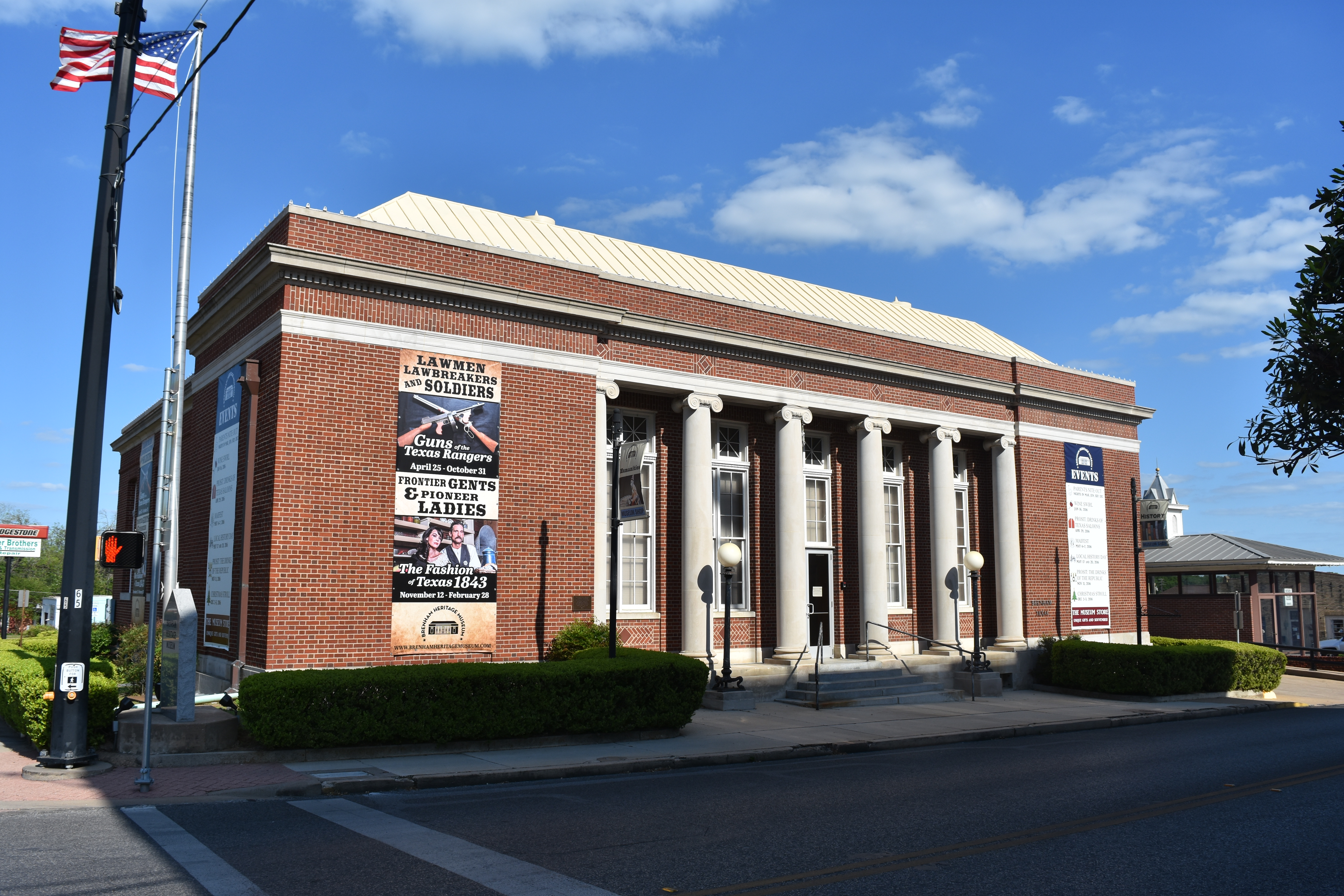
- Brenham Heritage Museum exterior
- Established: 1991
- Location: 105 South Market, Brenham, Texas 77833
- Coordinates: 30.1676°N 96.3961°W
- Type: Local history museum
- Director: David Thomas
- Website: brenhamheritagemuseum.org

- U.S. Post Office Federal Building-Brenham, TX
- U.S. National Register of Historic Places
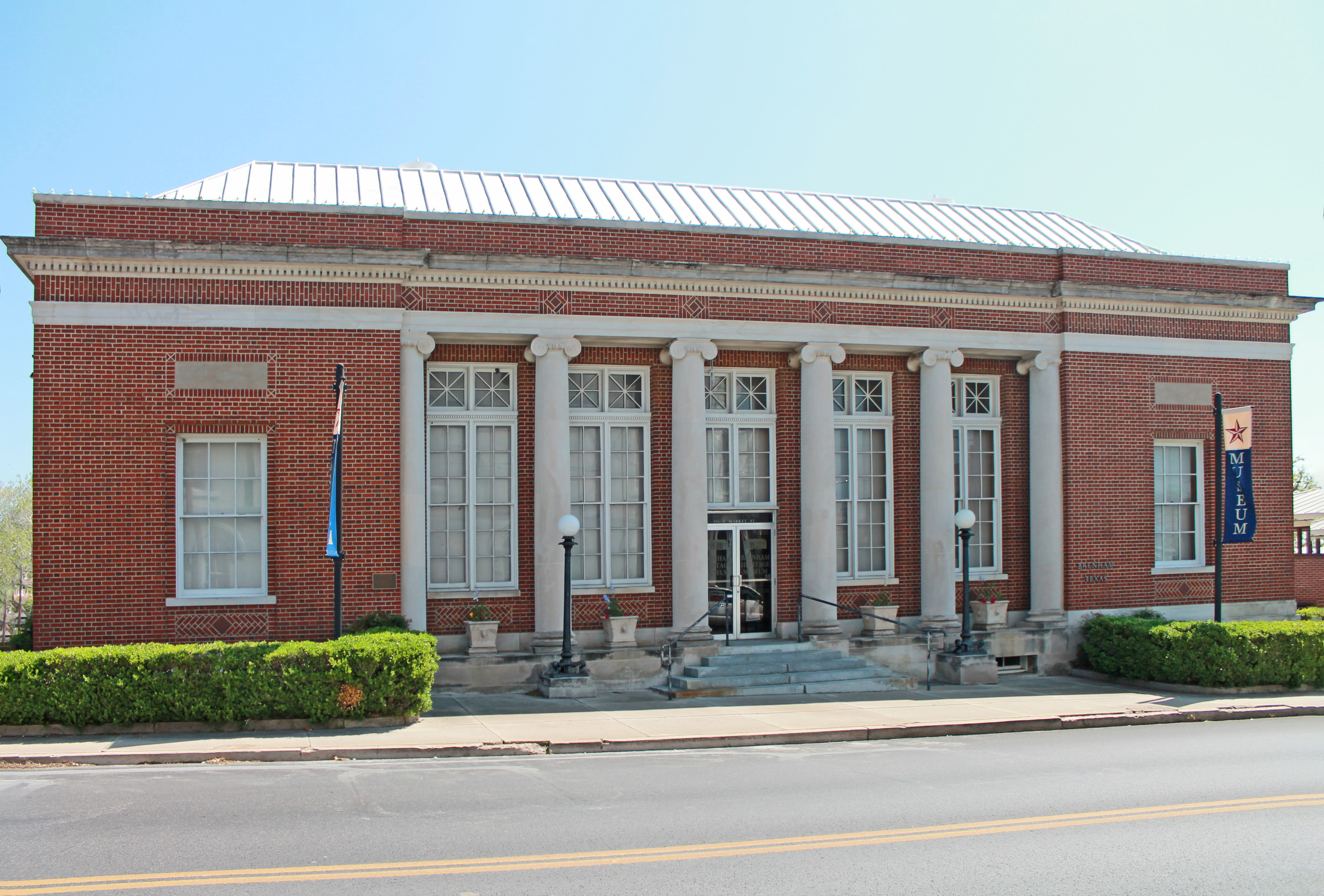

- Location within Texas Location within the United States
- Location: 105 South Market, Brenham, Texas 77833
- Area: Less than one acre
- Built: 1914-1916
- NRHP reference No.: 90000449
- Added to NRHP: March 29, 1990

The Brenham Heritage Museum is a local history museum in downtown Brenham, Texas located in the former US Post Office-Federal Building-Brenham listed on the National Register of Historic Places building. The museum is operated by the Brenham Heritage Museum Board of Directors, and staff members. The museum operates a second site, the Bus Depot Gallery, in the Art-Deco Kerrville Bus Lines Depot of Brenham.

== Origins ==
In 1991, the City of Brenham offered the former U.S. Post Office-Federal Building for use as a museum. A non-profit was established, collections were acquired, funds were raised and the museum opened soon after.

== Collections ==
The Brenham Heritage Museum has acquired the body of her collections from the citizenry of Brenham, Texas and the surrounding Washington County. A number of individuals and organizations have provided the museum with significant portions of the collection.

== Exhibits ==
The artifacts tell the story of Washington County, from German immigrant settlement to its development as an agricultural and industrial center.

== Museum building ==
The museum is located former US Post Office for the City of Brenham. The building was constructed between 1914 - 1916. and remained the post office until the mid-1960s, when a new post office was built nearby. The old post office structure then became a federal office building until is conversion to its current use as a museum.

Listed on the National Register of Historic Places in 1990, it was added due to its notable Classical Revival architecture.
