= Othello Maria Harris-Jefferson =

American educator

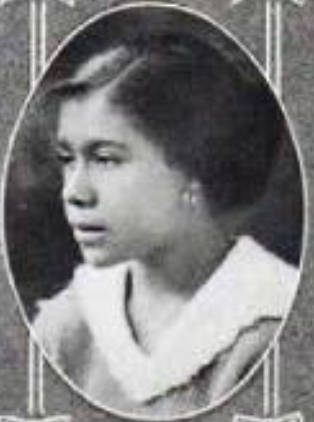
- Othello Maria Harris, from the 1922 yearbook of Howard University
- Born: Othello Maria Harris; February 23, 1905; Brenham, Texas
- Died: September 26, 1988 (aged 83)
- Occupations: Educator, college professor, civil rights activist

Othello Maria Harris-Jefferson (February 23, 1905 – September 26, 1988) was an American educator and activist from Texas. From 1929 to the 1960s, she taught at Bluefield State Teachers College in West Virginia, where the Othello Harris-Jefferson Student Center is named in her honor.

== Early life and education ==
Harris was born in Brenham, Texas, the daughter of Gertrude Smith. Her mother was a dressmaker. She graduated from Dallas Colored High School in 1918, and from Howard University in 1922. She earned a master's degree from Columbia University and began doctoral work there. She was a member of the Delta Sigma Theta sorority.

== Career ==
Harris taught education, psychology, drama, and speech classes and was supervisor of elementary education at Bluefield State Teachers College (now Bluefield State University) in West Virginia, from 1929 until the 1960s. In 1936 she helped start a graduate chapter of Delta Sigma Theta, at an event in her home. She was also a member of The Links.

Harris-Jefferson founded Bluefield State's Touchstone Guild and Aesthetic Club, both for students interested in the theatre. In time, the Aesthetic Club became more political in its interests, and it merged with the local NAACP chapter to work for civil rights causes. In 1954, she made a series of lectures in the Dallas, Texas, area. She helped to desegregate the lunch counters in Bluefield, and in 1965, she was honored by the Bluefield NAACP for her work.

== Personal life and legacy ==
Harris married fellow educator Phillip Grant Jefferson in 1932. Her husband died in 1986, and she died in 1988. At Bluefield State, the Othello Harris-Jefferson Student Center was named in her memory in 2000. In 2022, large framed portraits of Harris-Jefferson and her husband turned up at an auction house, and were donated to Bluefield State University.
