= Richard Fox Brenham =

American physician (c.1810–1843)

- Born: 1810; Woodford County, Kentucky, US
- Died: February 11, 1843 (aged 32–33)
- Occupation: physician

Richard Fox Brenham (c. 1810 – February 11, 1843) was an American medical doctor, and member of the Texan Santa Fe Expedition and the Mier expedition.

== Early life ==
Brenham was born in 1810 in Woodford County, Kentucky to Robert and Mary M. (Fox) Brenham. He was educated at Transylvania College before relocating to Texas.

== Life in Texas ==
From June 15 to September 15, 1836, he served in the Texas Army, receiving a 320-acre tract in Cooke County. He worked in medicine in Austin and was selected to serve as a civil commissioner of the Texan Santa Fe Expedition by Mirabeau B. Lamar. Due to the failure of the expedition, he was imprisoned in Mexico City, and upon release in April 1842, he returned to Austin to join the Mier expedition.

Brenham was killed in action on February 11, 1843, following a rebellion at Salado.

The city of Brenham, in Washington County was named after him, the year following his death.
