= Washington County Courthouse (Texas) =

Historic courthouse in Brenham, Texas

- U.S. National Register of Historic Places
- U.S. Historic district – Contributing property
- Recorded Texas Historic Landmark
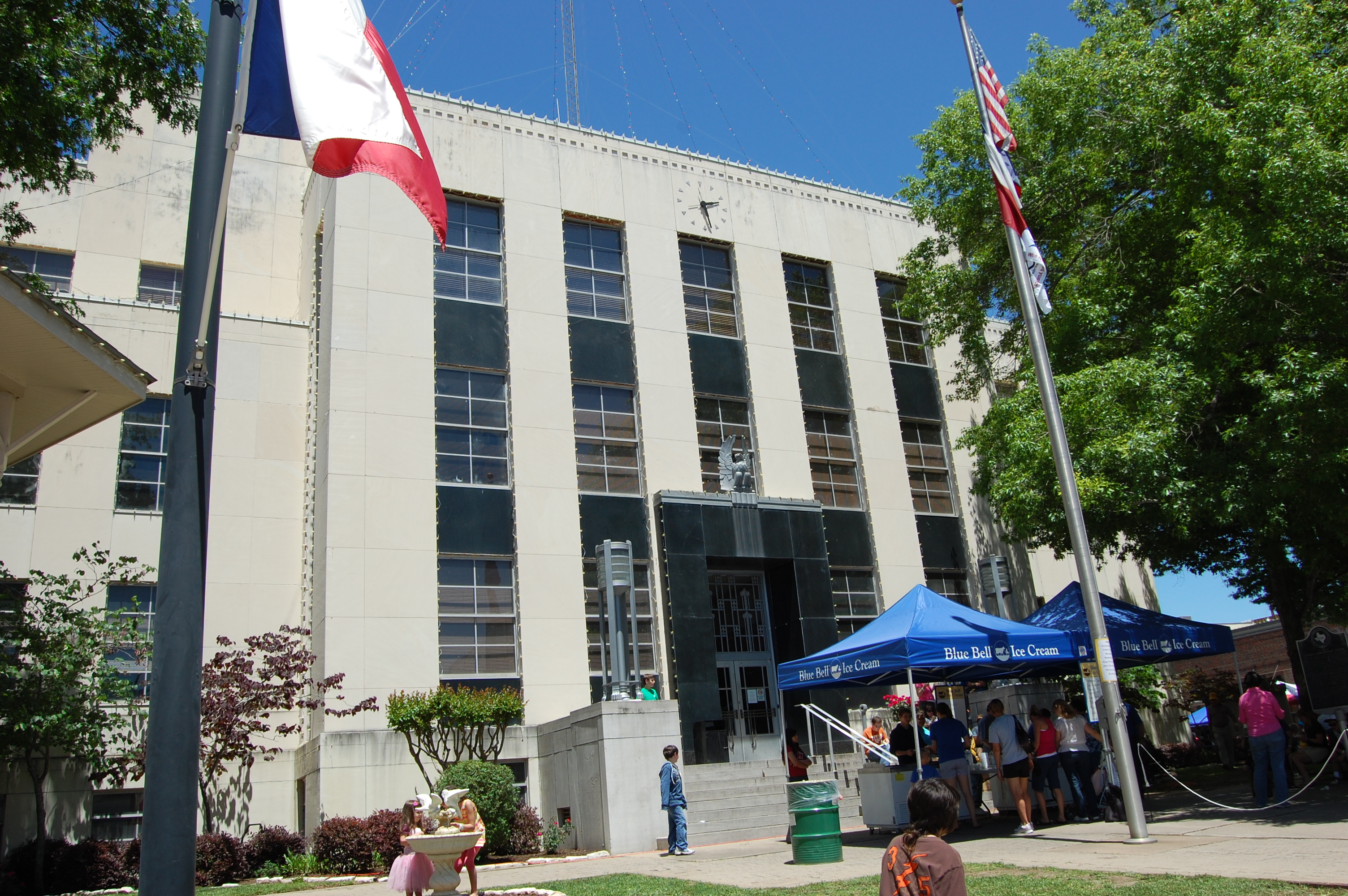
- Washington County Courthouse in 2010

- Location within Texas Location within the United States
- Interactive map showing the location of Washington County Courthouse
- Location: 110 E. Main St., Brenham, Texas
- Coordinates: 30°10′1″N 96°23′51″W
- Area: less than one acre
- Built: 1939
- Built by: C.L. Browning, Jr.
- Architect: Travis Broesche, Hendrick & Lindsley Inc.
- Architectural style: Art Deco
- Part of: Brenham Downtown Historic District (ID04000154)
- MPS: Brenham MPS
- NRHP reference No.: 90000447
- RTHL No.: 8401

Significant dates
- Added to NRHP: March 29, 1990
- Designated CP: March 10, 2004
- Designated RTHL: 1985

The Washington County Courthouse at 110 E. Main in Brenham, Texas is an Art Deco-style courthouse built in 1939. It was listed on the National Register of Historic Places in 1990 and is also part of the National Register-listed Brenham Downtown Historic District.

It is the fourth courthouse of Washington County; previous ones were built in 1844, 1852, and 1883. This was designed by architect Travis Broesche of the firm Henrick and Lindsley, Inc. It was built with Works Progress Administration assistance by contractor C.L. Browning Jr.

== See also ==
- National Register of Historic Places listings in Washington County, Texas
- Recorded Texas Historic Landmarks in Washington County
- List of county courthouses in Texas
