= Brenham State Supported Living Center =

State-operated living center in Brenham, Texas, U.S.

Coordinates: 30.126°N 96.385°W

The Brenham State Supported Living Center (formerly Brenham State School) is a state-operated living center for disabled people along Texas State Highway 36 in Brenham, Texas. It is operated by the Texas Health and Human Services.

In 1969 the 61st Texas Legislature passed the General Appropriations Act, establishing the Brenham State School. Originally it was operated by the Texas Department of Mental Health and Mental Retardation.

== Sources ==
- "Disabled Texans in three state homes have been drinking water with Flint-level amounts of lead", Dallas Morning News, May 2016
