= Blue Bell Creameries =

American ice cream company

- Type: Private
- Industry: Ice cream
- Founded: 1907; 119 years ago Brenham, Texas, U.S.
- Headquarters: Brenham, Texas, U.S.
- Key people: Jimmy Lawhorn, President
- Revenue: Over US$500 million (2018) Estimated US$680 million (2014)
- Number of employees: Over 1,000 (2018)
- Website: bluebell.com

Blue Bell Creameries is an American food company that manufactures and sells ice cream. As of 2015, Blue Bell was the #2 selling ice cream manufacturer in the United States. The company was originally founded in 1907, in the small town of Brenham, Texas. For much of its early history, the company manufactured both ice cream and butter locally. In the mid-20th century, it abandoned butter production and expanded to the entire state of Texas and soon much of the Southern United States. The company's corporate headquarters are located at the "Little Creamery" in Brenham, Texas, and since 1919, it has been in the hands of the Kruse family.

== History ==
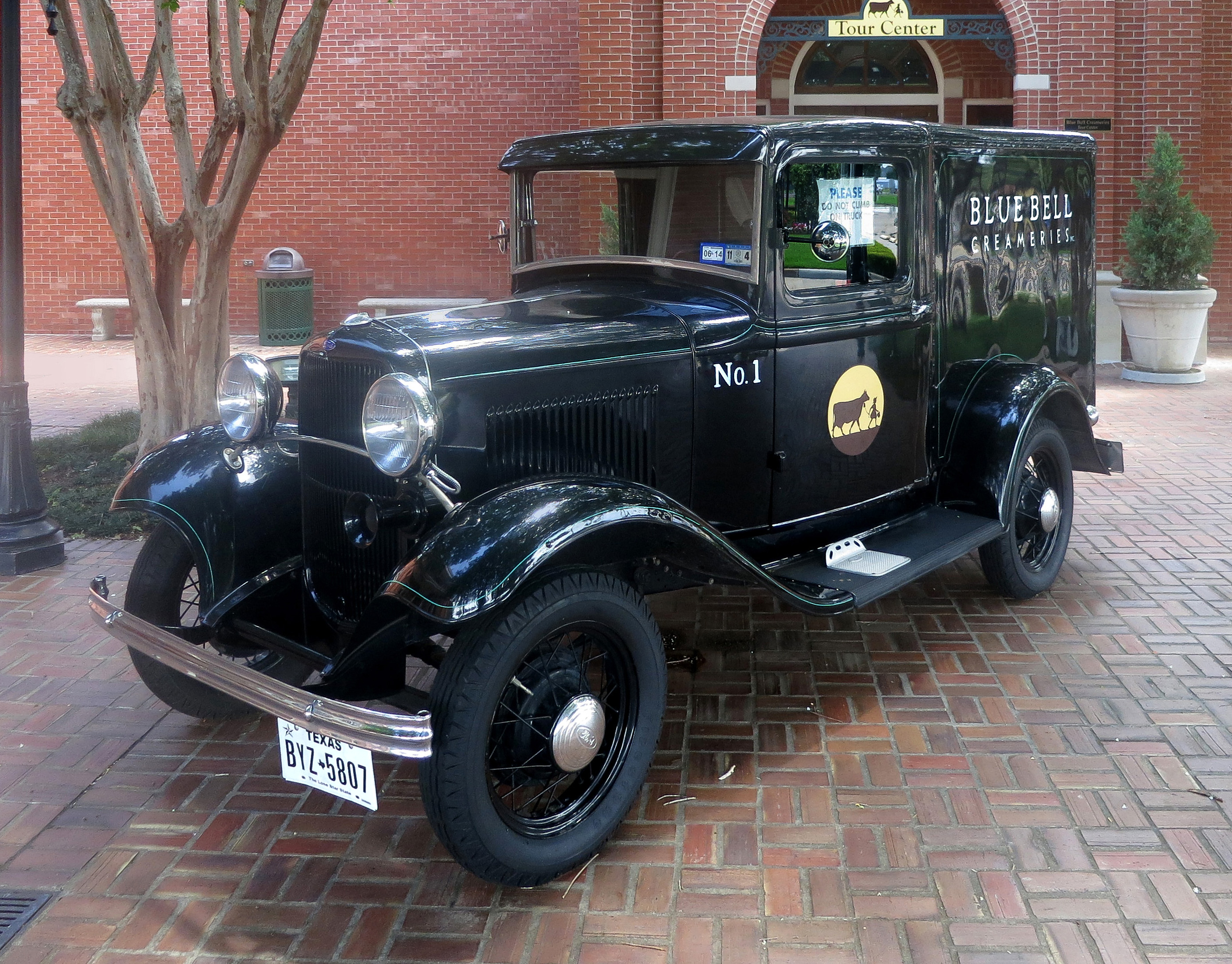
A restored delivery truck at the Brenham creamery

=== Origins ===
The company originally opened in 1907 under the name 'Brenham Creamery Company' with the original goal of purchasing excess cream from local dairy farmers and selling butter to people living in Brenham, Texas; a town located approximately 70 miles (110 km) northwest of Houston. In 1911, the creamery began to produce small quantities of ice cream.

By 1919, the Creamery was in financial trouble and considered closing its doors. The board of directors hired E.F. Kruse, a 23-year-old former school teacher, to take over the company on April 1, 1919. Kruse refused to accept a salary for his first few months in the position so that the company would not be placed in further debt. Under his leadership, the company expanded the production of ice cream towards the surrounding Brenham areas and soon became profitable. At his suggestion, the company was to be renamed as 'Blue Bell Creameries' in 1930 after Kruse's favorite wildflower the Texas bluebell.

Leading up to the year of 1936, the creamery made ice cream by the batch. It could create a 10-US-gallon (38 L) batch of ice cream every 20 minutes. That same year the company purchased its first continuous ice cream freezer, which could make 80 US gallons (300 L) of ice cream per hour. The ice cream would run through a spigot, allowing it to be poured into any size container.

E.F. Kruse was diagnosed with cancer in 1951 and died eight weeks after diagnosis. After his passing, his sons Ed and Howard took over the leadership of the company.

=== Product changes and turning a profit ===
By the 1960s, the company completely abandoned the production of butter and began focusing solely on ice cream. After many years of selling ice cream only in Brenham, the company began selling its ice cream in the Houston area, eventually expanding throughout most of Texas including the Dallas–Fort Worth metroplex and the state capital of Austin.

Leading up to the end of the 1970s, sales had quadrupled, and by 1980 the creamery was producing over 10 million gallons (37,850,000 liters) of ice cream per year, earning $30 million annually.

During the year 1989, Blue Bell began selling ice cream in Oklahoma, and throughout the 1990s expansion pushed throughout the South Central and Southern United States, eventually expanding to New Orleans and Jackson, Mississippi. In 1992, Blue Bell built a new manufacturing facility in Broken Arrow, Oklahoma. Four years later, in 1996, Blue Bell opened a third manufacturing facility in Sylacauga, Alabama, southeast of Birmingham, and eventually expanded into Atlanta and Miami.

Once Blue Bell establishes itself within a market, word-of-mouth usually ensures that consumers in adjacent areas become aware of the brand. Blue Bell has been slow to expand: company executives say they thoroughly research each new market and ensure that all employees in the new markets are fully trained in Blue Bell practices so that product quality can be upheld. Blue Bell often tends to expand to markets during March each year, expanding to Colorado on March 14, 2011, followed by the Richmond and Hampton Roads areas of Virginia in 2013, and Las Vegas in 2014. These expansions are accompanied by the purchase and/or construction of distribution centers in new markets that serve areas within a 75-mile (121 km) radius.

=== Listeriosis outbreak ===
In 2015, Blue Bell issued a series of product recalls for the first time in its 108-year history. The recall was issued on an assortment of items produced at its creameries, due to the discovery of five cases of listeriosis in Kansas believed to be caused by products produced at its creamery in Broken Arrow, Oklahoma. Three of the five patients who contracted Listeria from the products died.

Despite a series of subsequent recalls, and a temporary shutdown of its Broken Arrow plant, "an enhanced sampling program" launched by Blue Bell produced "several positive tests for Listeria in different places and plants", including three further cases in Texas. As a result, on the evening of April 20, 2015, the company took precautionary measures and expanded its recall to cover all of its products leading to the disposal of over eight million gallons of product in a sanitary landfill.

At the same time, the company shut down production and commenced cleanup and repair operations at its manufacturing facilities. The FDA found that the company failed to follow standard practices to prevent contamination; two years prior to the recalls, the company "repeatedly found listeria" in its Broken Arrow facility. At its main production facility in Brenham, one of its production machines (which produced most of the recalled products) was considered to be so contaminated that Blue Bell announced it would have to permanently stop using the machine. Condensation was also reportedly noted in various parts of the Brenham facility.

Although a spokeswoman for Blue Bell had previously objected towards the idea of subjected job losses, on May 15, Blue Bell announced a series of job cuts and furloughs. 1,450 (or roughly 37 percent) of the company's employees would be subjected to lay offs, while another 1,400 employees were furloughed until cleanup/repair operations concluded, and the remaining 1,050 involved in essential operations and cleanup/repair operations had wage reductions imposed.

Due to limited supply and distribution capabilities expected in the near term, Blue Bell announced it would suspend operations at 15 of 50 distribution centers indefinitely, though it had not ruled out returning to these markets eventually. The affected distribution centers included:

- Phoenix, Arizona (2 branches)
- Tucson, Arizona
- Denver, Colorado
- Indianapolis, Indiana
- Kansas City, Kansas
- Wichita, Kansas
- Louisville, Kentucky
- Las Vegas, Nevada
- Albuquerque, New Mexico
- Charlotte, North Carolina
- Raleigh, North Carolina
- Columbia, South Carolina
- Richmond, Virginia
- Suffolk, Virginia (Hampton Roads area)

The recalls became so severe that they threatened to shut down the company entirely; executives warned shareholders that they faced a "capital crisis." On July 14, 2015, Sid Bass, a prominent Texas investor, became a partner and investor with the company; Blue Bell secured a $125 million loan to continue pursuing operations. Around the same time, Blue Bell's plant in Sylacauga, Alabama resumed production, creating 'test' batches as part of a "test and hold" procedure in which ice cream is not packaged for sale until the batch tests negative for all strains of bacteria including the strain of listeria responsible for the aforementioned recalls.

=== Department of Justice investigation ===
External videos
- "Department of Justice investigating Blue Bell Listeria outbreak". CBS Evening News report dated December 29, 2015, outlining the United States Department of Justice investigation into Blue Bell Creameries.

In December 2015, CBS Evening News reported that the United States Department of Justice (DOJ) had launched a federal criminal investigation into Blue Bell Creameries, to determine "what exactly Blue Bell executives knew about the contaminations and unsanitary conditions, when they knew, and what they did in response". The investigation, by the DOJ's Consumer Protection Branch, is reportedly led by trial attorney Patrick Hearn, who successfully prosecuted executives of the Peanut Corporation of America in 2015. The company pleaded guilty in 2020 to charges it distributed contaminated products and paid a $19.35 million fine.

On October 22, 2020, Paul Kruse, Blue Bell's Chief Executive Officer during the outbreak, and formerly, its general counsel, was indicted on seven felony counts of conspiracy and wire fraud for his part in the alleged cover-up. In August 2022 the DOJ tried Kruse on five counts of fraud and one count of conspiracy. The trial ended in a mistrial after jurors could not reach a unanimous verdict. The DOJ scheduled a retrial for April 2023, but reached a plea deal with Kruse in March. Under the plea deal, Kruse pleaded guilty to one misdemeanor charge of having caused adulterated ice cream products to be distributed and was handed a $100,000 fine, but wasn't sentenced to prison.

=== Return to shelves and current news ===
On August 17, 2015, Blue Bell announced a five-phase plan to return to store shelves:

- Phase 1: Houston and Austin areas of Texas, plus Birmingham and Montgomery areas of Alabama (near the company's Sylacauga facility).
- Phase 2: North central Texas (Dallas–Fort Worth) and northern Oklahoma including Tulsa (near the company's Broken Arrow facility).
- Phase 3: Southwest Texas (San Antonio) and central Oklahoma including Oklahoma City.
- Phase 4: Majority of Texas plus southern Louisiana including Baton Rouge and New Orleans.
- Phase 5: Remainder of Texas, Alabama, Oklahoma and Louisiana, plus all of Arkansas, Florida and Mississippi and parts of Georgia, Kentucky, Missouri, New Mexico, North Carolina, South Carolina, Tennessee and Virginia.

However, even in those states where Blue Bell plans to return, it would not necessarily return to all of its pre-recall markets by the final phase. Those markets, including Charlotte, Kansas City, Louisville, and Phoenix, were added based on the fact that Blue Bell will effectively service those areas. Wichita, KS was the last to return in mid-April 2023.

Phase 1 began on August 31, 2015. Phase 2 began in November of 2015. A month later, phases 3 and 4 began.

The day following the initial rollout, September 1, Blue Bell resumed production at its Broken Arrow, Oklahoma, facility.

On January 28, 2016, the company resumed distribution to large portions of the Southeastern US.

On March 6, 2017, Blue Bell reopened the three distribution centers located in Tucson (1) and Phoenix (2) to complete distribution across the state of Arizona

In 2018, children of an interracial family posted an open letter on Facebook addressed to Blue Bell asking that the flavor "The Great Divide" (equal halves of chocolate and vanilla ice cream) be changed to "Better Together". While Blue Bell spokespersons reacted positively to the name change proposal, the post became controversial among some Facebook users who dismissed claims that the original name was offensive.

In March 2018, the company began distribution to much of Indiana, midsection of Kentucky and northern New Mexico.

In March 2019, the company resumed distribution to much of the Virginia area, northeastern North Carolina and greater Kansas City.

In July 2019, Blue Bell Creameries faced backlash after an internet video went viral of a teenager licking a tub of Blue Bell's ice cream then proceeding to place the tub back into the freezer. The location of the event took place at a Walmart in Lufkin, Texas. The individual was later arrested. After the incident, multiple individuals trying to copy the viral act, resulting in more individuals being jailed. These incidents resulted in severe negative reactions asserting that violating food in such a manner is dangerous to the public health, along with criticisms that not enough action was being taken to punish offenders, and against Blue Bell for not protecting their ice cream with a plastic seal.

In March 2022, the company resumed distribution to Clark & Nye counties in Nevada, but there may be possible expansion to greater Los Angeles, California.

In mid-April 2023, distribution returned to Wichita, Kansas.

February 2025 saw southern Utah being introduced for the first time.

March 2026 brought Cincinnati & Dayton, OH to the company's new markets.

== Products ==
Blue Bell produces over 250 different frozen products. Of these, 66 are flavors of ice cream. Twenty of the flavors are offered year-round, while an additional two to three dozen are offered seasonally. In addition to ice cream, the company produces frozen yogurt, sherbet, and an array of frozen treats on a stick. Unlike competitors which have reduced their standard containers to 48-56 fluid ounces (1.42-1.66 L), Blue Bell continues to sell true half-gallon (64 fl oz/1.89 L) containers, a fact it mentions prominently in its advertising.

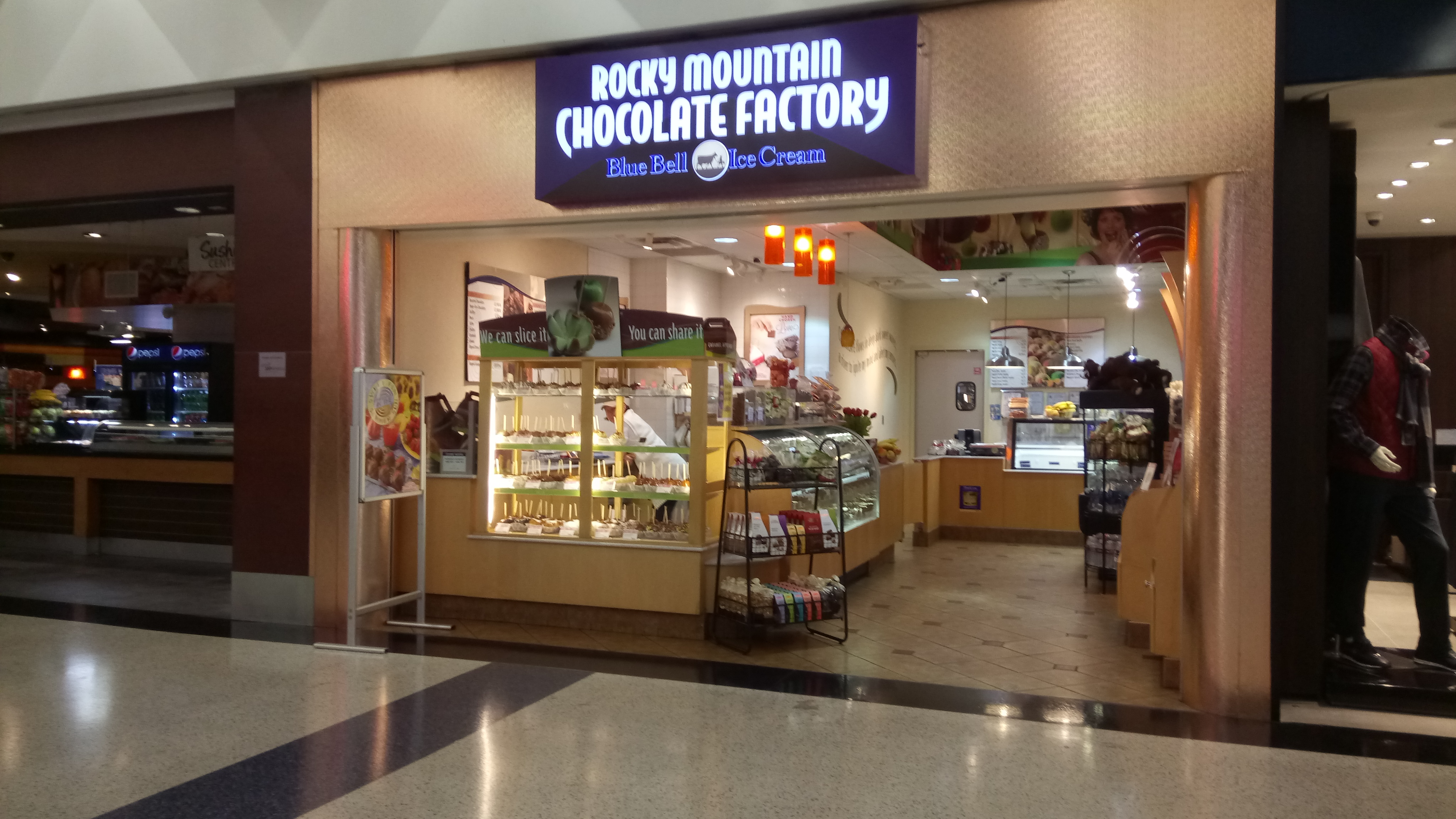
Blue Bell shop at George Bush Intercontinental Airport

The company introduced its flagship flavor, Homemade Vanilla, in 1969 and was supposedly the first company to mass-produce the flavor cookies 'n cream. Although the company at one time made cookies 'n cream from Nabisco's Oreo cookies, buying ordinary retail packages, today it bakes its own cookies. As of 1997, Blue Bell Homemade Vanilla was the best-selling single flavor of ice cream in the United States, and in 2001, Forbes named Blue Bell the best ice cream in the country.

R.W. Apple Jr., of The New York Times claimed in 2006 that "[w]ith clean, vibrant flavors and a rich, luxuriant consistency achieved despite a butterfat content a little lower than some competitors, it hooks you from the first spoonful. Entirely and blessedly absent are the cloying sweetness, chalky texture, and oily, gummy aftertaste that afflict many mass-manufactured ice creams."

Occasionally, when Blue Bell enters a market the company marks the occasion with the introduction of a regional flavor within that market. For example, when it entered Colorado on March 14, 2011, Blue Bell introduced a new flavor exclusive to Colorado, Rocky Mountain Road, made with more premium ingredients (including chocolate-covered nuts and a marshmallow swirl) compared to its year-round Rocky Road. While the test market was in the Denver metropolitan area, there was speculation that the rest of the state would soon see Blue Bell on store shelves. Eventually, this flavor would be distributed to Blue Bell's entire sales territory.

In May 2025, Blue Bell announced a revival of a popular flavor named Groom's Cake Ice Cream for a limited time. This flavor was discontinued in 2018, and was fans' No. 1 pick in their Great Scoop Revival Flavor Tournament in 2024.

== Operations ==
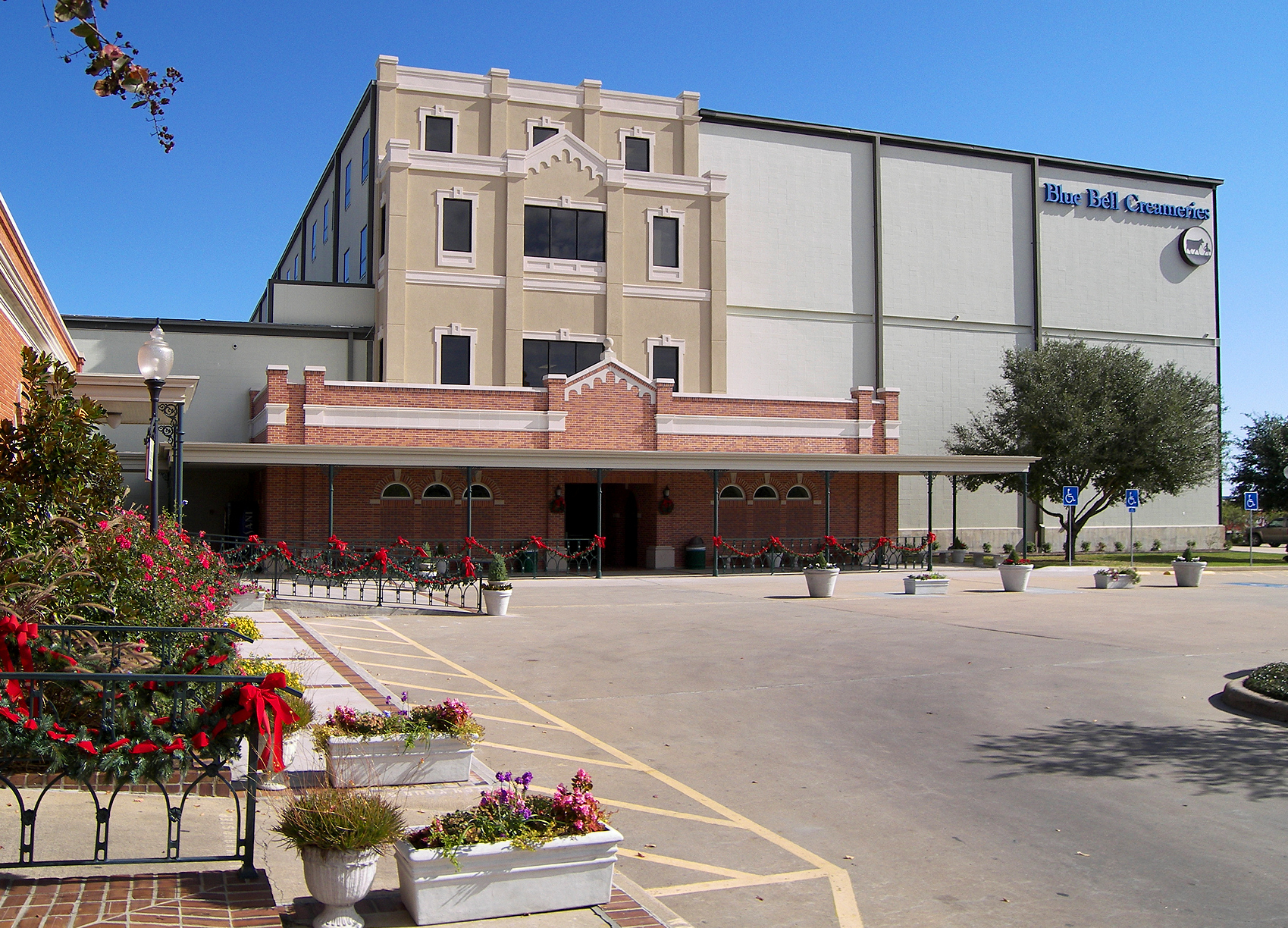
The Blue Bell factory in Brenham

Before the 2015 recalls, there were 50 sales and distribution centers, known as branches, spread throughout its 24-state market. These facilities employed a combined 2,800 employees, with 850 of the employees working out of Brenham. In 2006, annual sales exceeded $400 million. As of 2015, the company operated three manufacturing facilities, with the largest facility in Brenham, and auxiliary facilities in Broken Arrow, Oklahoma, and Sylacauga, Alabama.

According to figures gathered by Statista, a market data and statistics portal, while combined private labels sold more, in 2014 Blue Bell was the best-selling ice cream brand in the United States. The sales area is primarily concentrated in the Southern United States, and has been sold as far west as Las Vegas, as far north as Indianapolis and Denver, and as far east as Richmond, Virginia. Overall, this area comprises only 20% of the United States. By comparison, each of Blue Bell's top four competitors sells its products in 100% of the United States. To become one of the three biggest ice cream manufacturers, Blue Bell has consistently been the top seller in the majority of the markets the company has entered. For example, in its home state of Texas, the company has a 52% market share. Within five months of its entry into Baton Rouge, Louisiana, the company had garnered 35% of the ice cream market. People living outside the sales area can have the ice cream shipped to them (although this has temporarily been halted while the company is ramping up production after the recalls), and former President George W. Bush (a former Governor of Texas) often had the ice cream shipped to Camp David during his administration. In 2006 and 2012, astronauts aboard the International Space Station were also treated to Blue Bell ice cream "to help out (the crew's) happiness quotient."

Blue Bell retains control over all aspects of its business, primarily to ensure quality control and the use of the freshest ingredients available. All production and packaging takes place within Blue Bell facilities, which are able to produce over 100 pints per minute. Drivers of delivery vehicles personally stock store shelves so they can ensure it is handled properly.

The company uses milk from approximately 60,000 cows each day, and the cream used during each day's production run is always less than 24 hours old. The Kruses claim "the milk we use is so fresh it was grass only yesterday".

== See also ==
- List of dairy product companies in the United States
