= Brenham Downtown Historic District =

Historic district in Texas, United States

- U.S. National Register of Historic Places
- U.S. Historic district
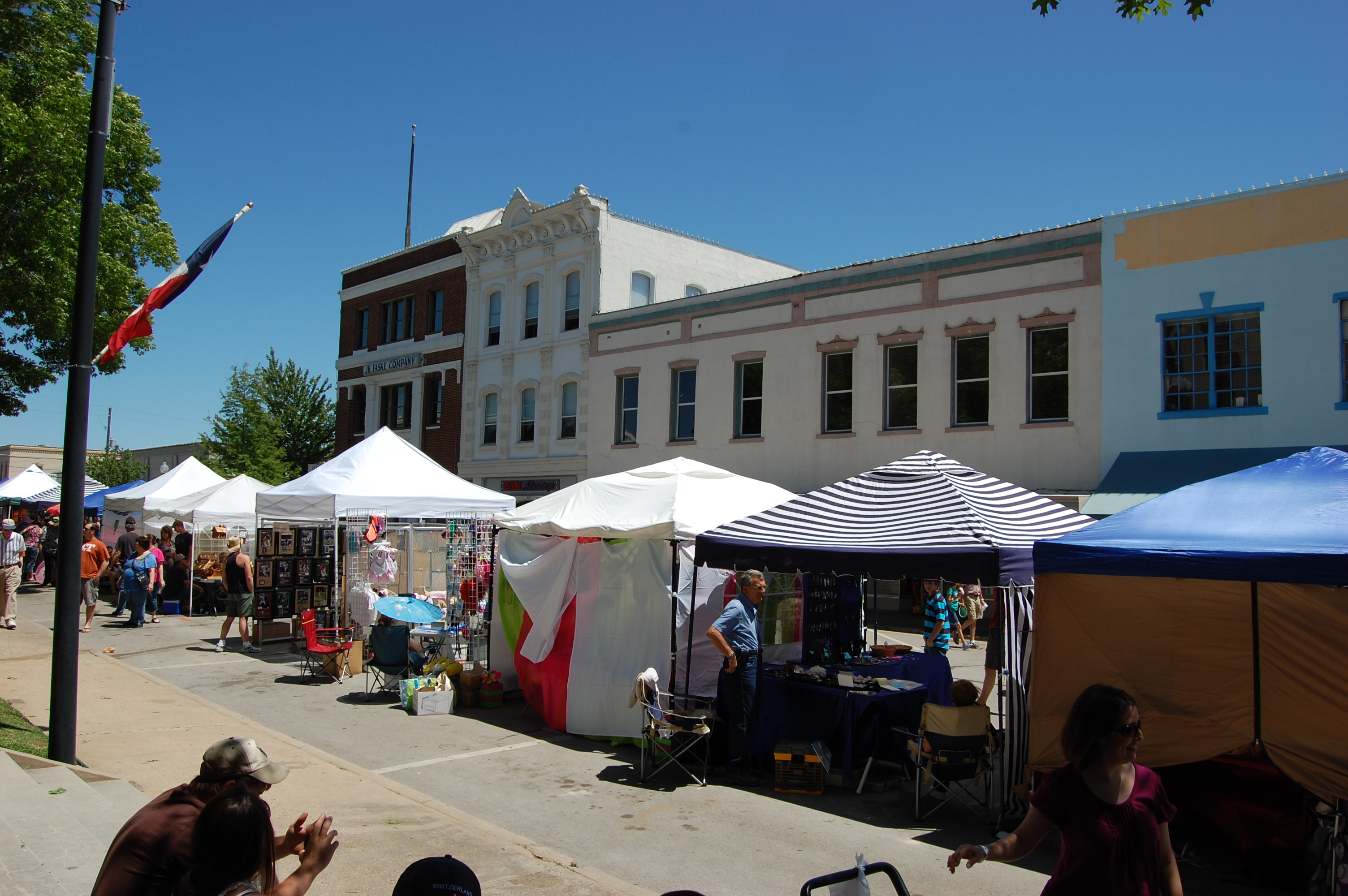
- Brenham downtown during the 2010 Flavors of Texas Festival

- Location within Texas Location within the United States
- Location: Brenham, Texas
- Coordinates: 30°10′0″N 96°23′49″W
- Area: 38 acres (15 ha)
- Built: 1861
- Architect: James Wetmore, Alfred Finn, et al.
- Architectural style: Italianate, Classical Revival, et al.
- MPS: Brenham MPS
- NRHP reference No.: 04000154
- Added to NRHP: March 10, 2004

The Brenham Downtown Historic District in Brenham, Texas was added to the National Register of Historic Places in 2004. Buildings in the district were designed by Alfred C. Finn, James Wetmore, and others in Classical Revival and other styles. Included in the district is the Simon Theatre.

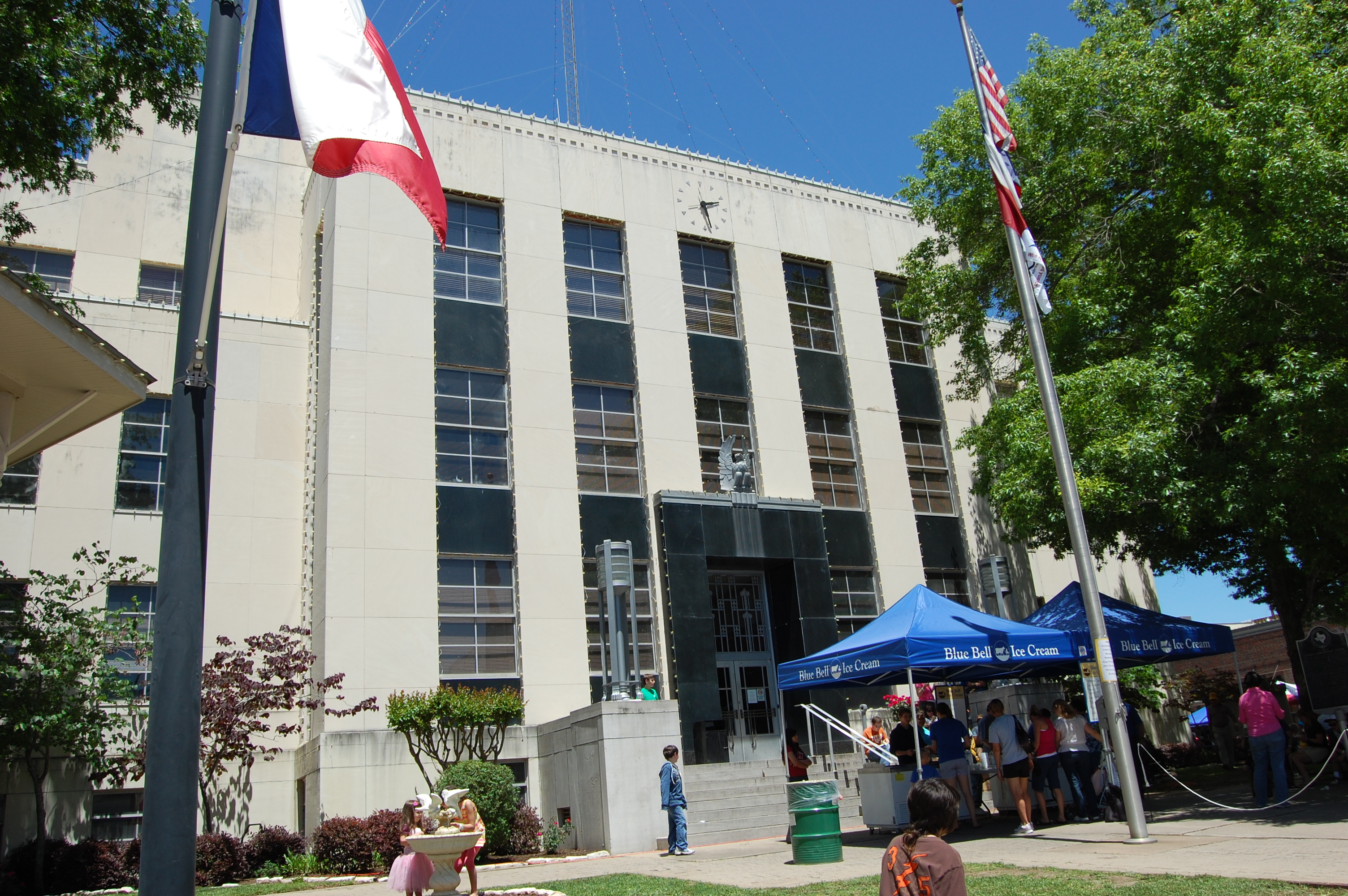
Washington County Courthouse

The 1939 Washington County Courthouse is also a contributing property to the district.

== Gallery ==
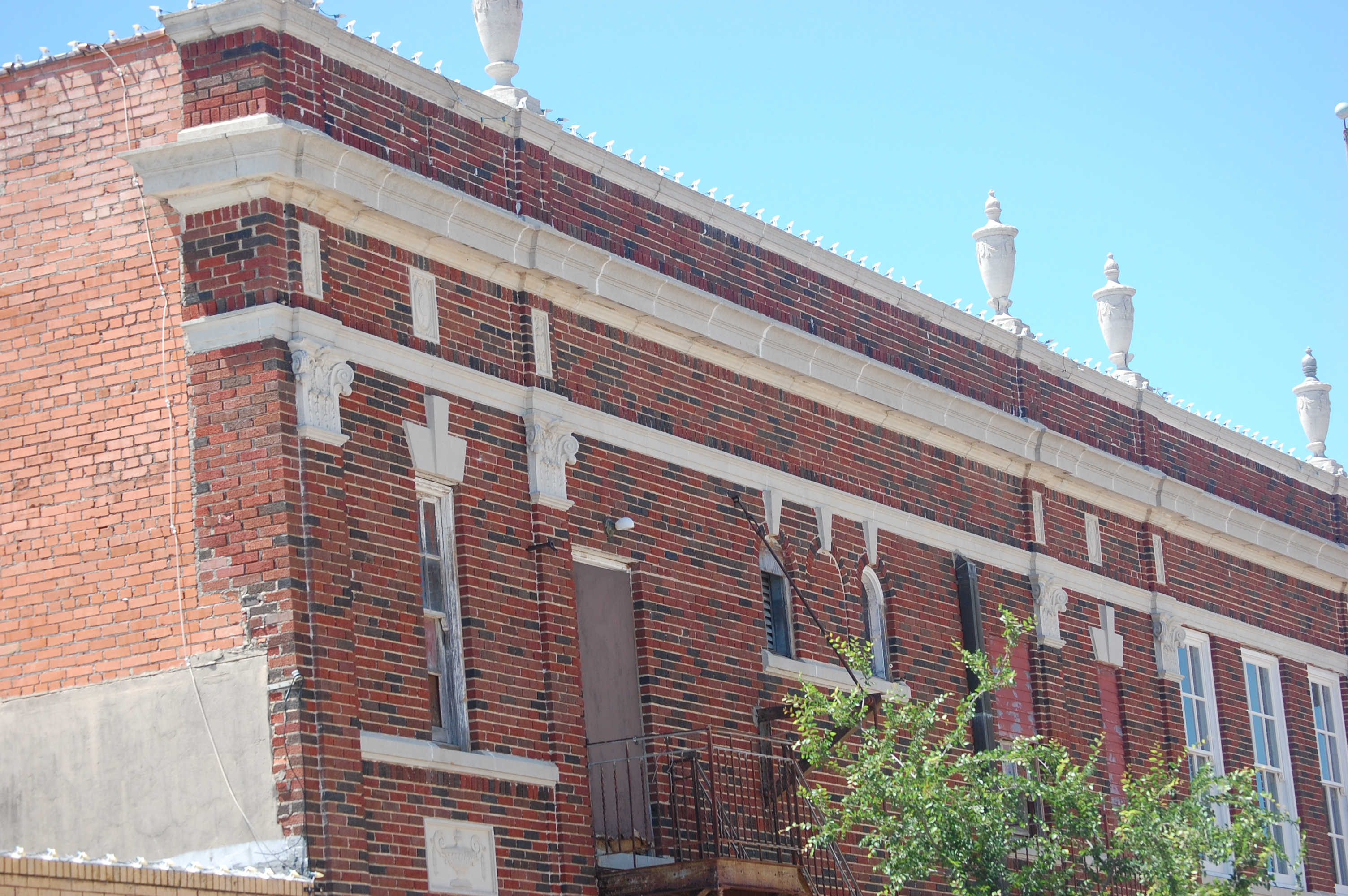
Simon Theatre in Brenham

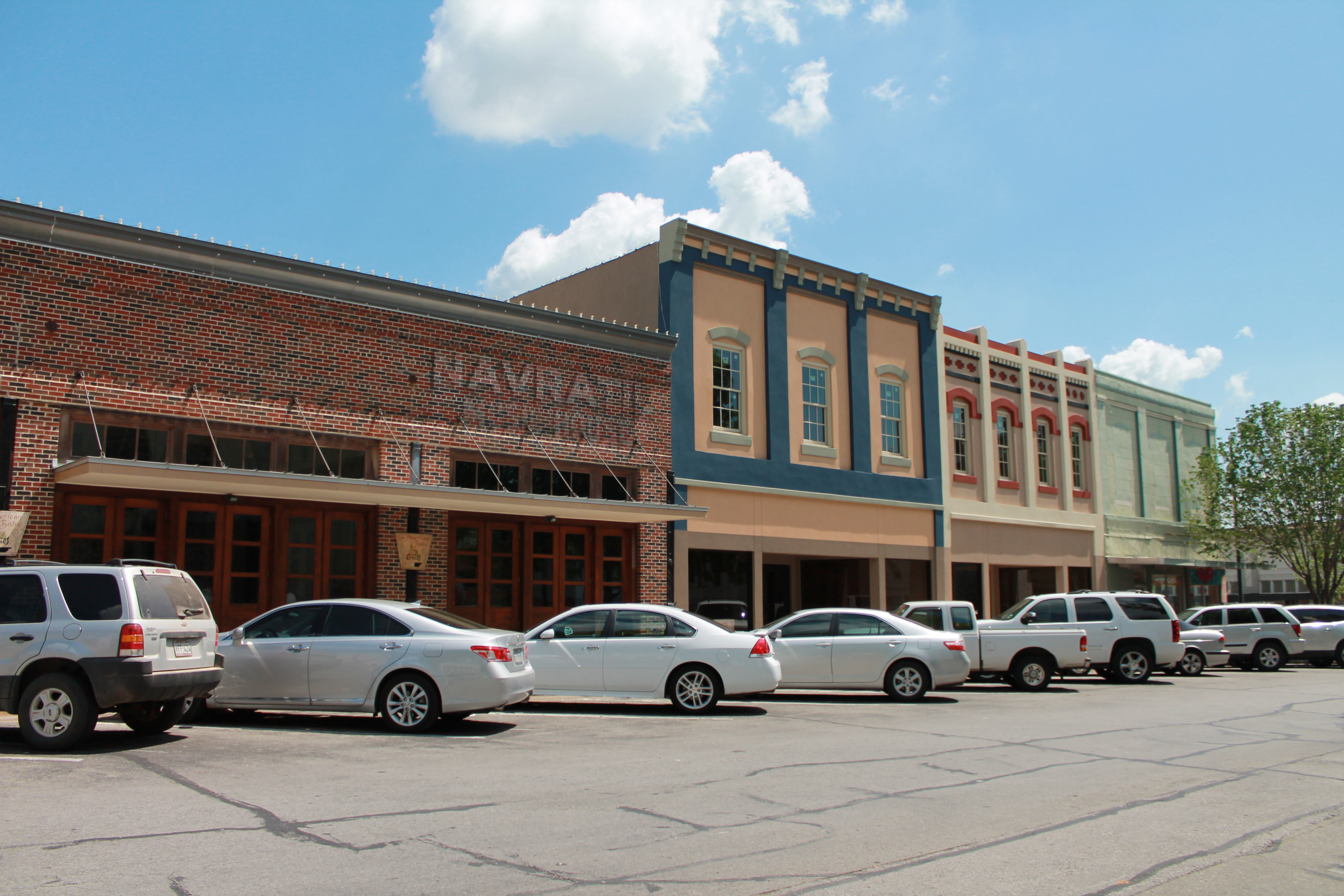

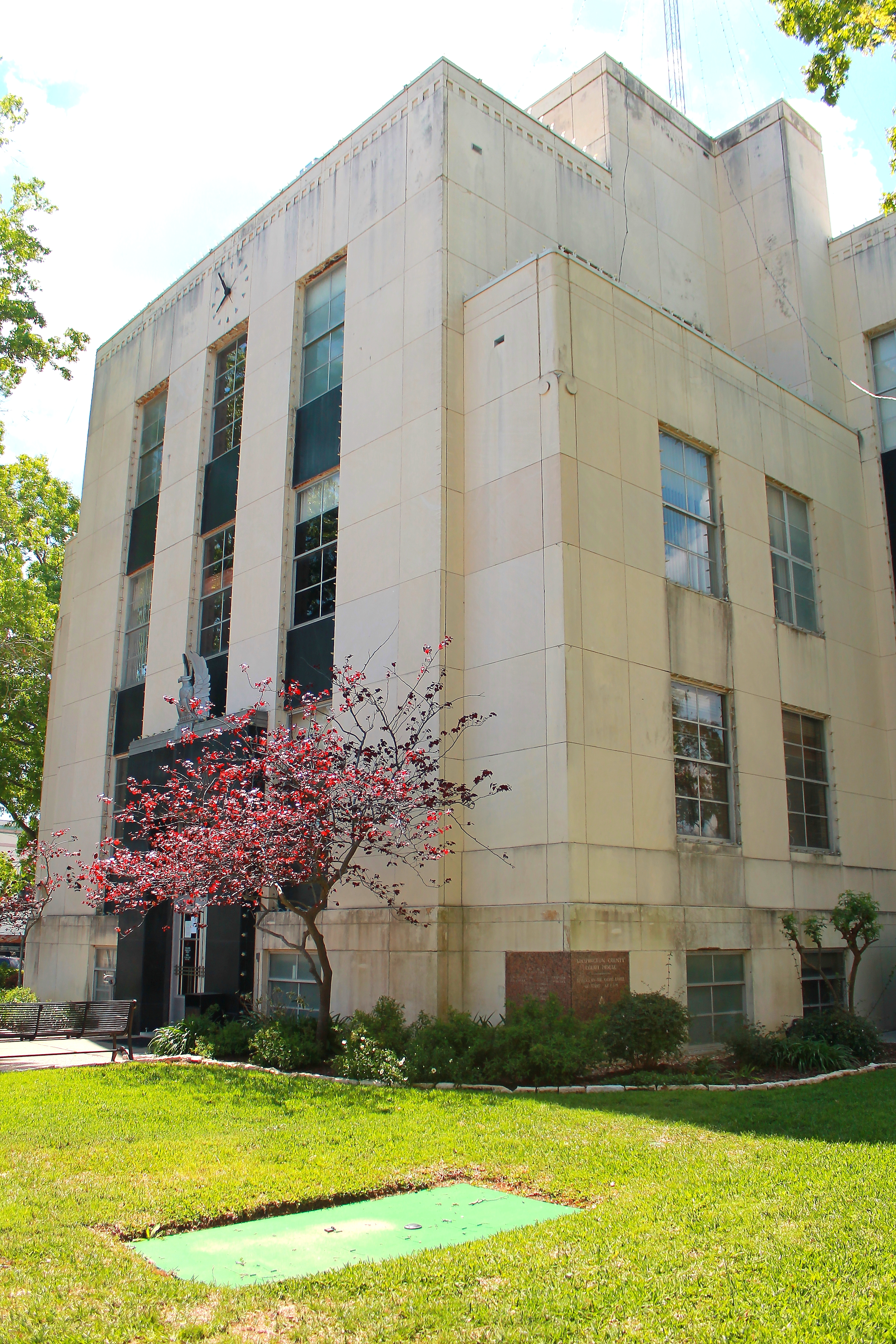

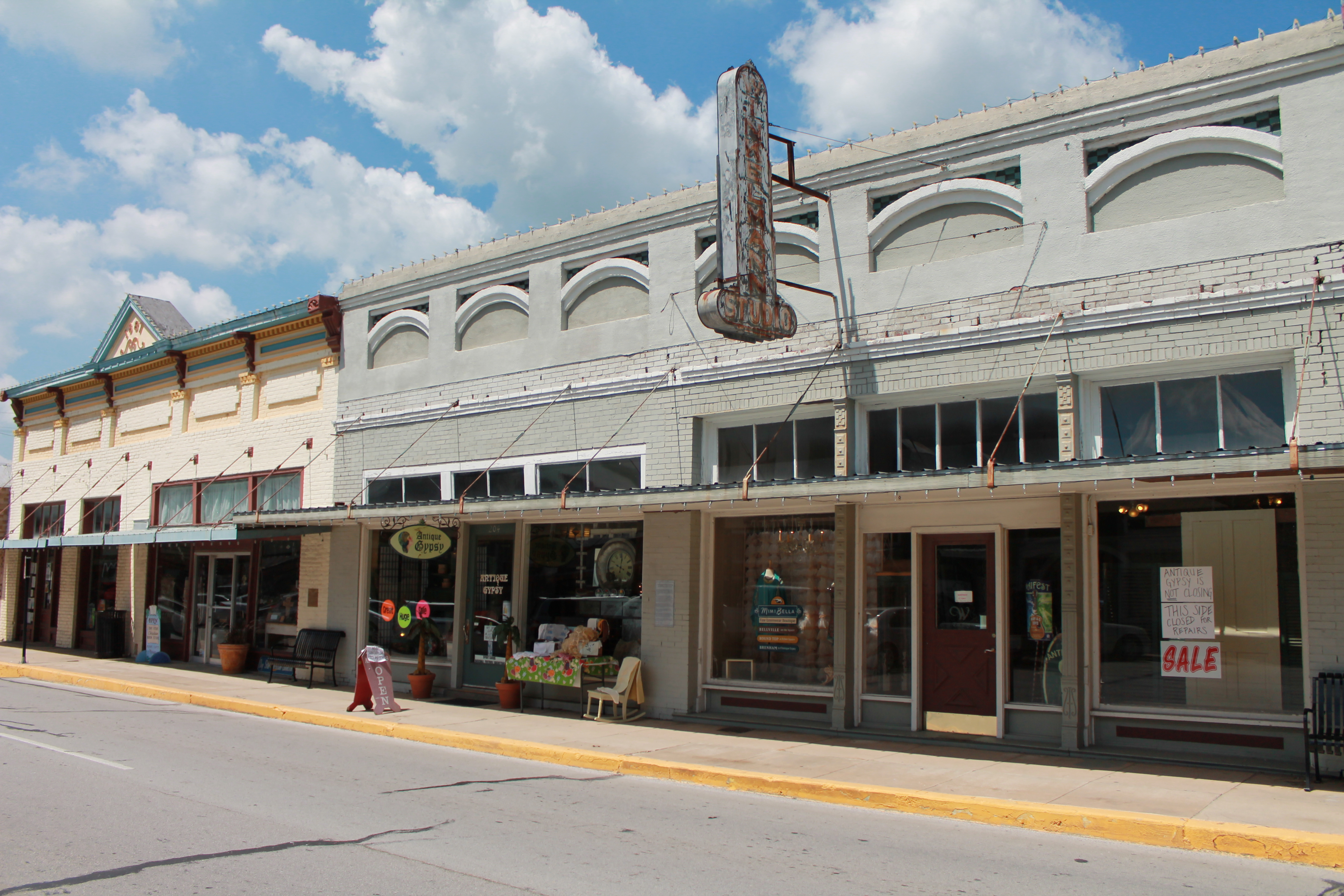

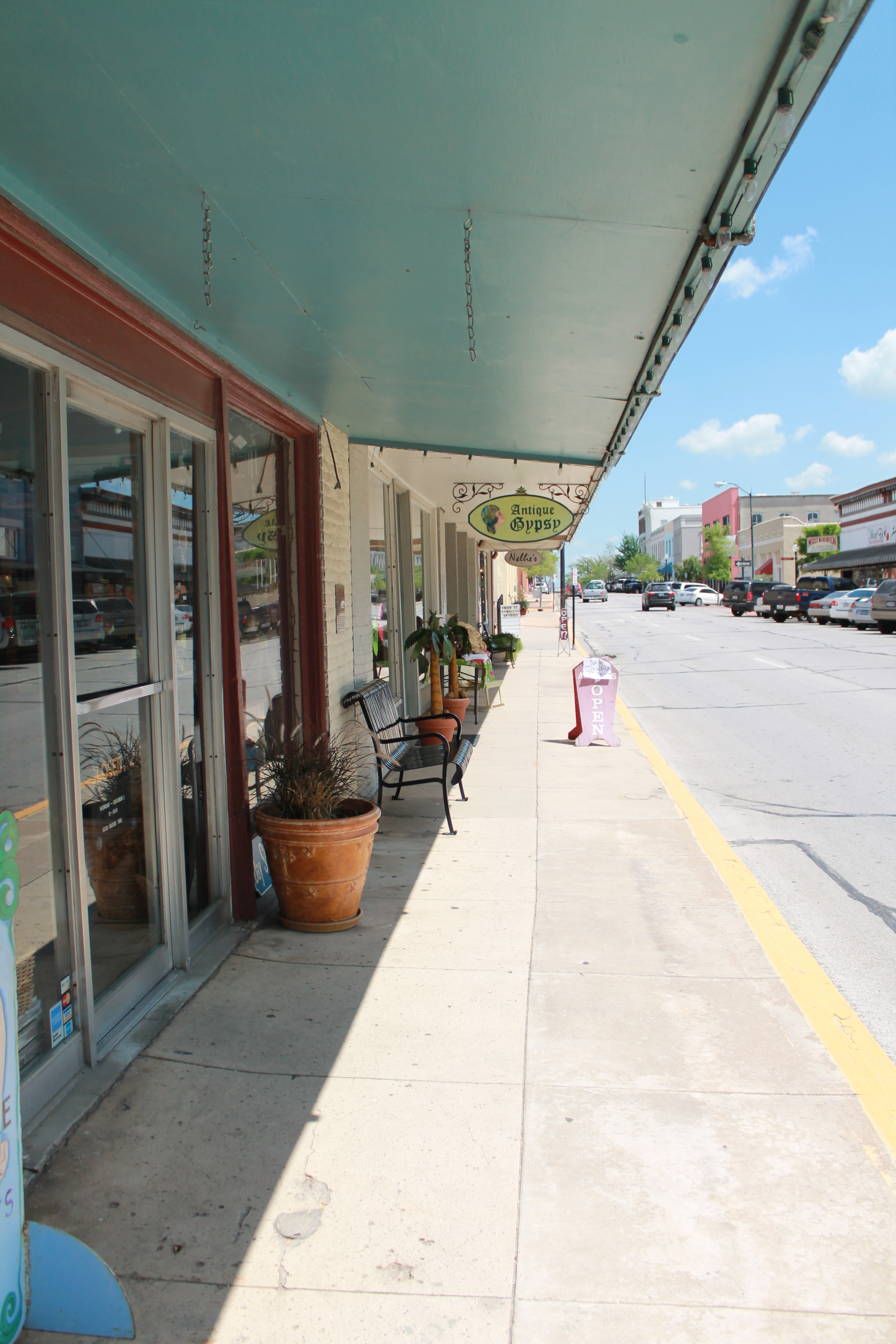

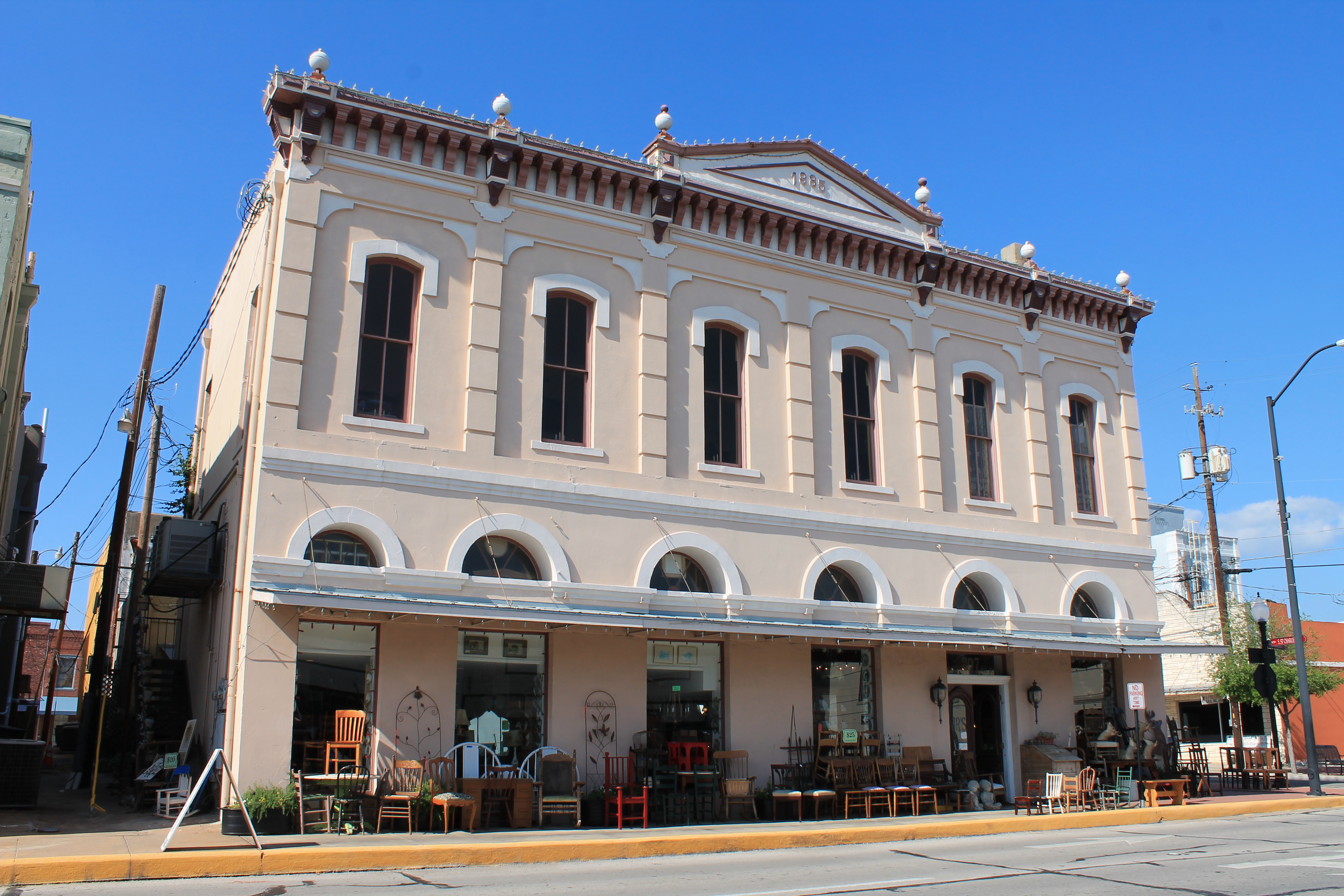

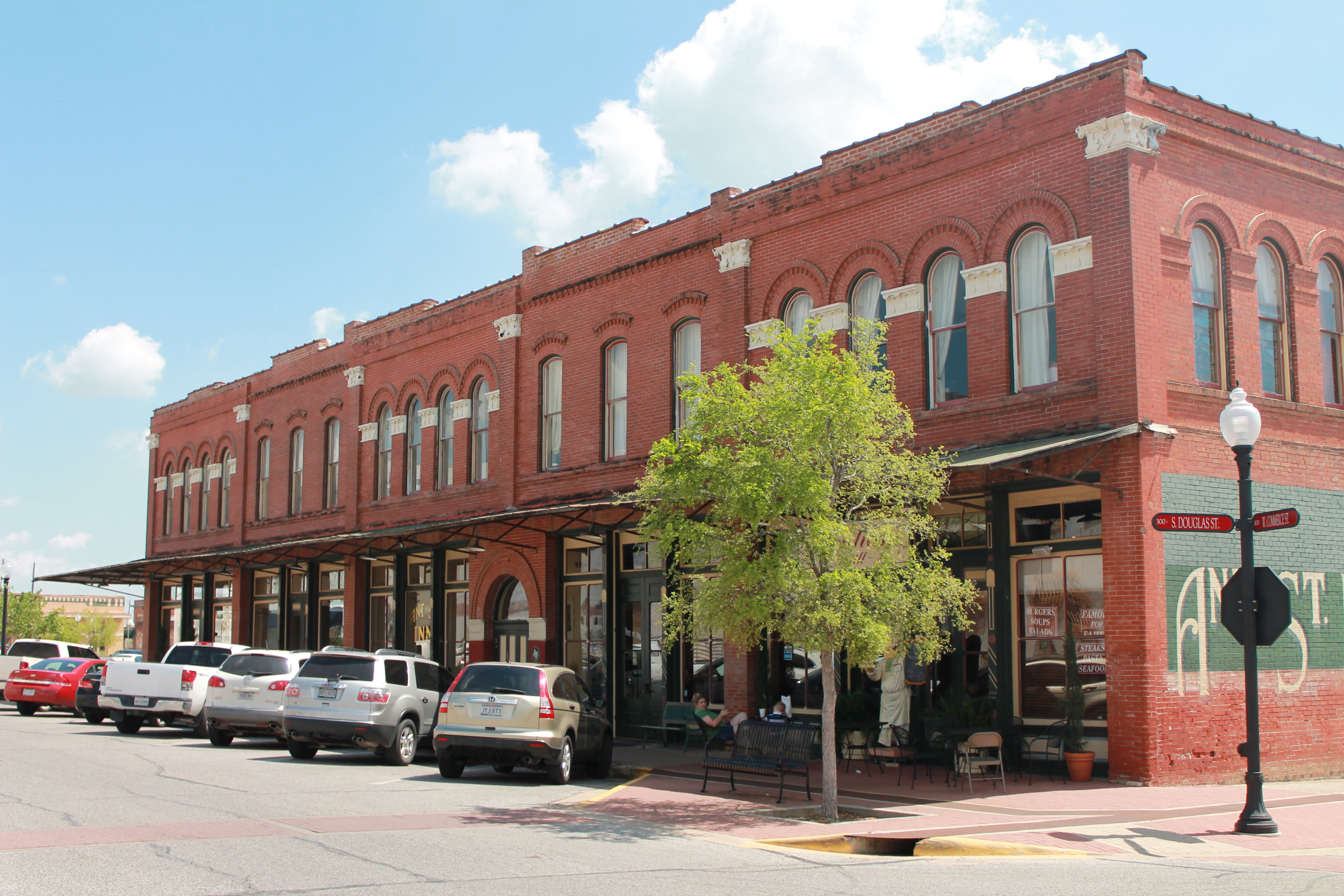

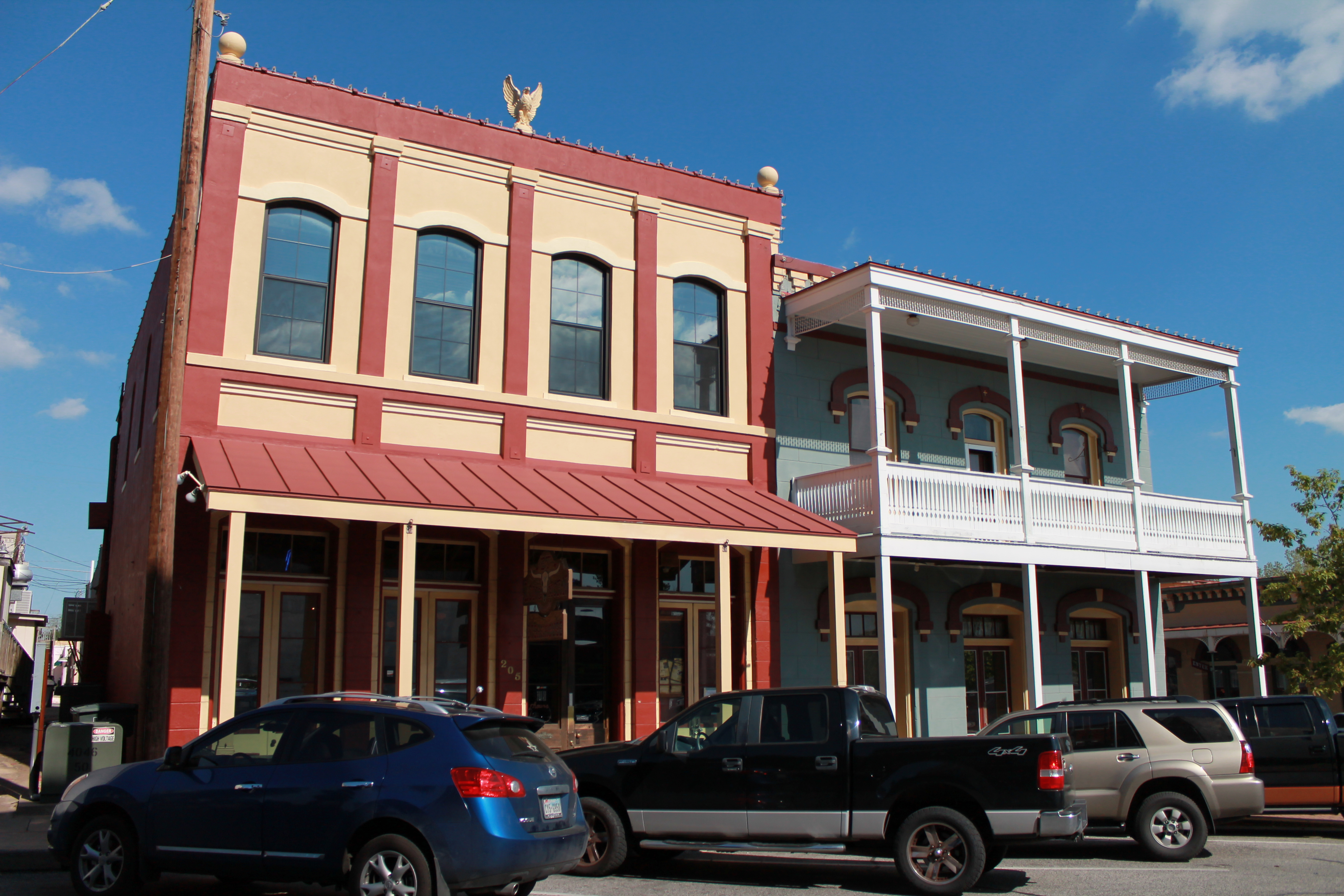

== See also ==
- National Register of Historic Places listings in Washington County, Texas
- Recorded Texas Historic Landmarks in Washington County
