= Texas Department of Aging and Disability Services =

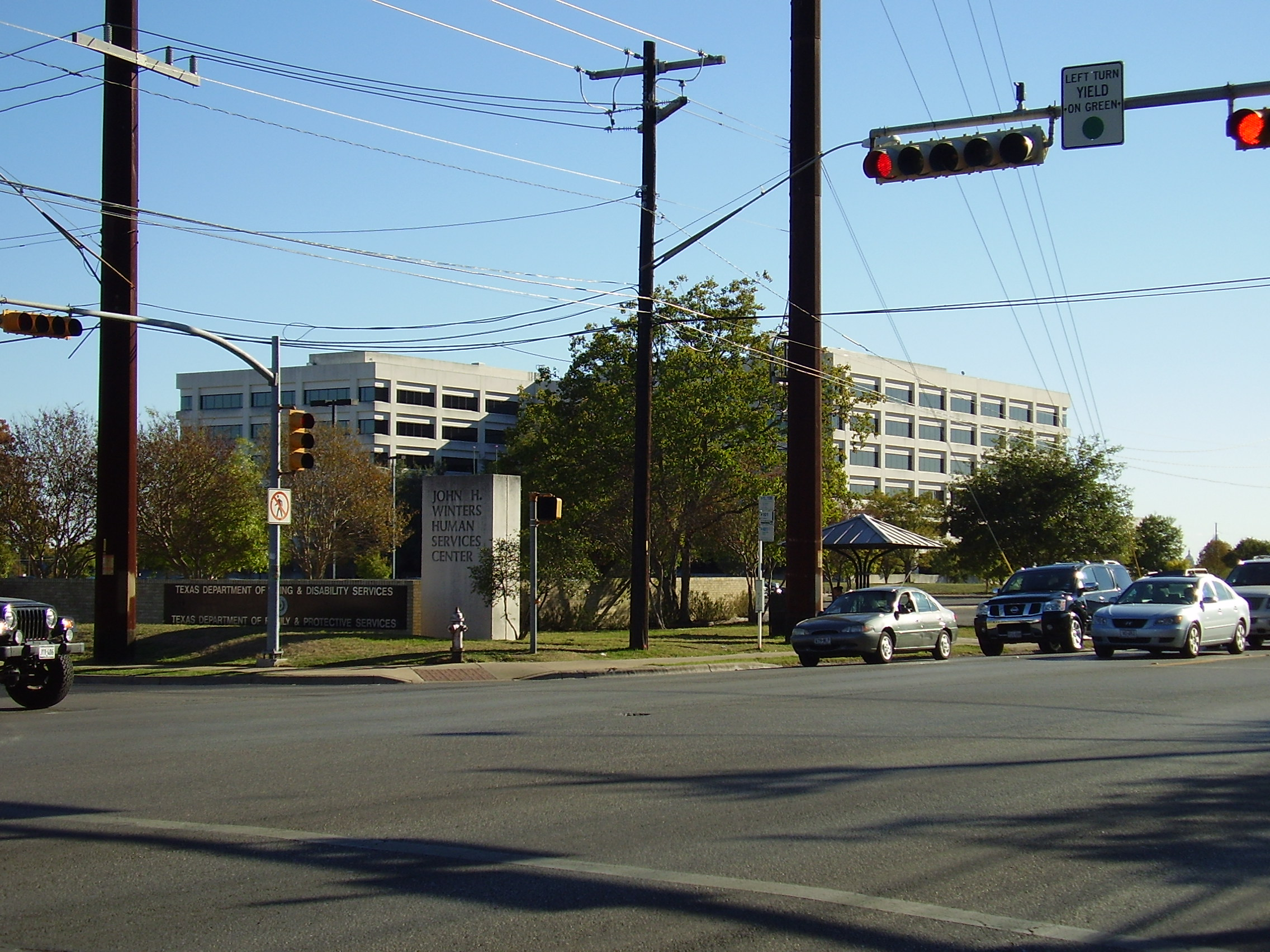
John H. Winters Human Services Center includes the headquarters for Texas Department of Aging and Disability Services

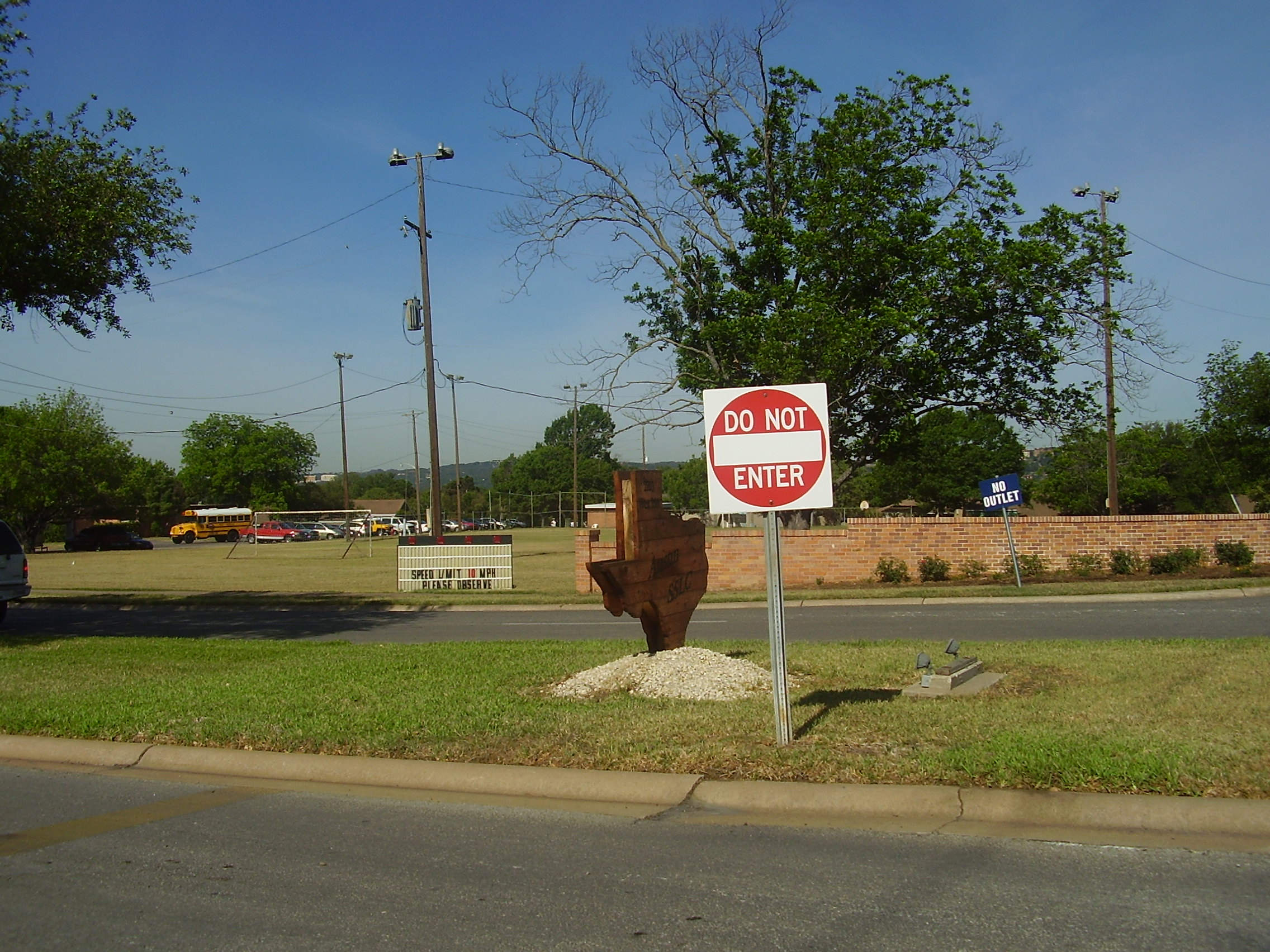
Austin State Supported Living Center (previously Austin State School)

Texas Department of Aging and Disability Services (DADS) was a state agency that supported the state's elderly and disabled population. The agency maintained its headquarters in the John H. Winters Human Services Center at 701 West 51st Street in Austin.

The department operated the state supported living centers (formerly "state schools"), which are centers for severely disabled people.

DADS was investigated by the U.S. Department of Justice for abuse against clients and mistreatment of care staff. .

In September 2017, this agency was shut down, and its functions were merged into the Texas Health and Human Services Commission.
