= Louise Martin (photographer) =

American photographer

- Born: Louise Ozelle Martin; January 9, 1911; Brenham, Texas, U.S.
- Died: July 15, 1995 (aged 84); Houston, Texas, U.S.
- Known for: Photography

Louise Ozelle Martin (9 January 1911 – 15 July 1995) was an American professional photographer who received recognition for her photographs of Houston Freedom Riders, Dr. Martin Luther King Jr., and beyond. She is known as a pioneer for African-American female photographers.

== Early life and education ==
Martin was born in Brenham, Texas, which was a small German town near Houston, on January 9, 1911, to Vanda Martin and Barbara (Harris) Martin. She became interested in photography at a young age due to her love of pictures, which her mother encouraged. When Martin was eleven years old, her mother bought her her first camera for $3.98. By the time she was a junior in high school, Martin had replaced the company that took school photos at her high school. Martin's mother encouraged her to study home economics or nursing at a local Black university, but the courses that she was interested in were not offered. Instead, she worked in a River Oak mansion until she could afford to enroll at the University of Denver. Martin left Texas to go to school in Chicago because colleges from the South had racial discrimination policies that did not allow black people to attend. She studied photography at the Art Institute of Chicago and at the American School of Photography. In 1946 she received a degree in photography from University of Denver School of Photographic Arts and Scientists. While there, she was the only Black woman enrolled.

While at the University of Denver, Martin worked as a freelance photographer. She took photographs of soldiers, as World War II increased the demand for portraits of servicemen. Martin's activity in Denver led to her joining the Rocky Mountain Association in the early 1950s. In 1952, she joined the Southwestern Photographers Convention as its only black member. Her success in the Southwestern Photographers Convention led to her memberships in the Texas Professional Photographers Association, the Professional Photographers of America, the Southwest Professional Photographers Association, and the Business and Professional Women's Association. She was known for her use of lighting and her skill at retouching photographs.

== Career ==
Later in life, Martin moved to Houston, Texas. In Houston, she married Uriete Boze, a railroad porter. Shortly after their marriage, though, they divorced, as he wanted her to stay at home, and she was dedicated to her career.

In Houston, Martin received a lot of recognition and success in photography. In 1946, she founded the Louise Martin Art studio, which served Houston's Black community-schools, churches, and the social world that travelled through Houston. Martin estimated that three-fourths of her clientele were women. She became known as "Houston's Society Photographer". Martin worked for the Houston Forward Times and the Houston Informer, two Black Houston newspapers.

Martin took photographs of celebrities, frequently as they passed through Houston including John F. Kennedy, Dwight D. Eisenhower, Richard Nixon, Coretta Scott King, Marian Anderson, and Jesse Jackson.

In 1968, the Forward Times and the Houston Informer both sent Martin to the Funeral of Martin Luther King Jr., where she was the only African American female photojournalist assigned. Her aerial photographs and portraits of Coretta Scott King earned her national acclaim. Several of her photographs of the funeral have been acquired by museums, including the International Center of Photography and the Museum of Fine Arts, Houston, and some of them appeared in Life Magazine.

By the early 1970s, Martin had received 27 awards in photography. She was a pioneer for female African-American photographers.

Martin died on July 15, 1995, in her Third Ward home. She is buried in the Willow Grove Cemetery in Brenham.

== Collections ==
Martin's work is included in the following permanent collection:

- Museum of Fine Arts, Houston
