= Brenham, Texas =

- City
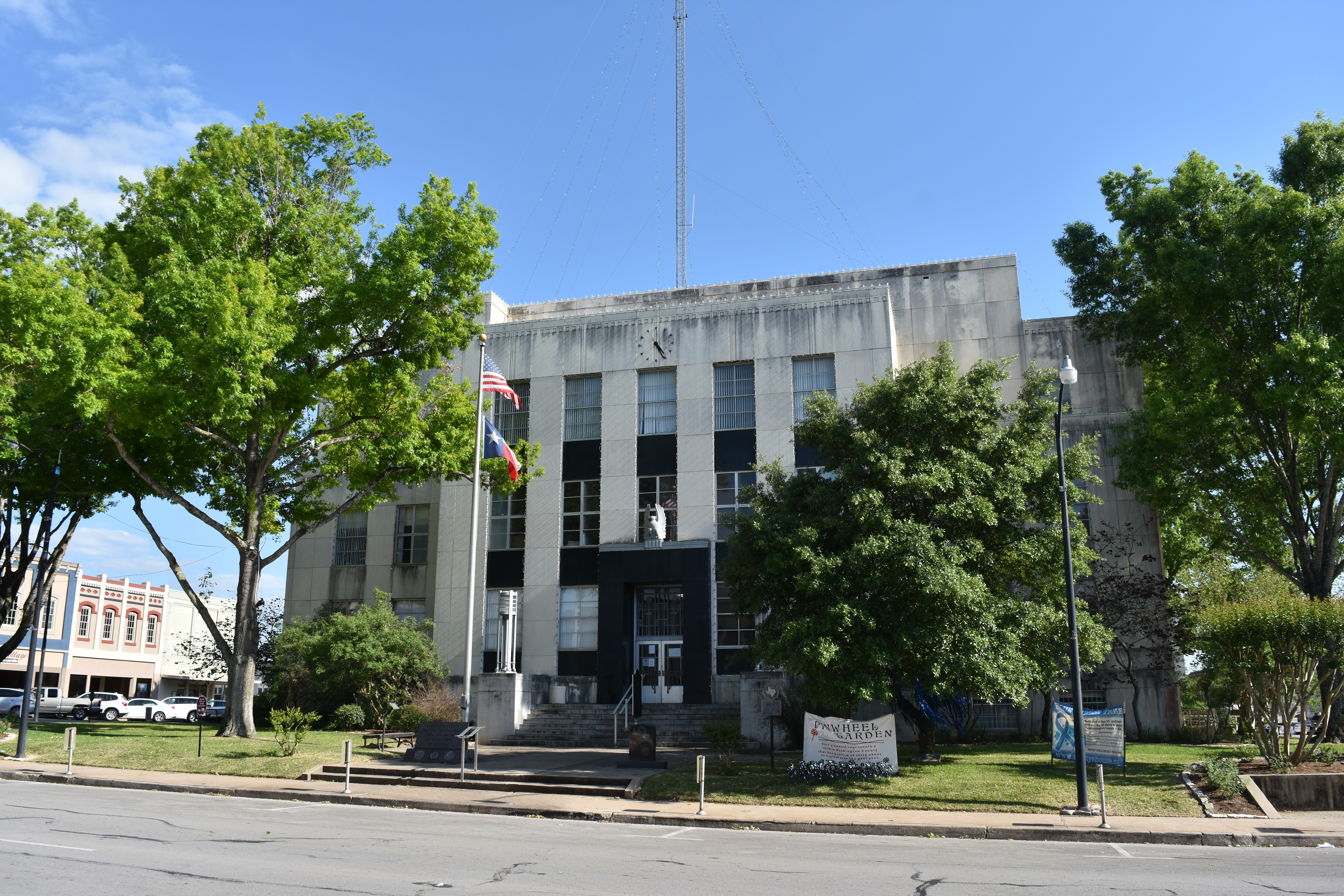
- Washington County Courthouse

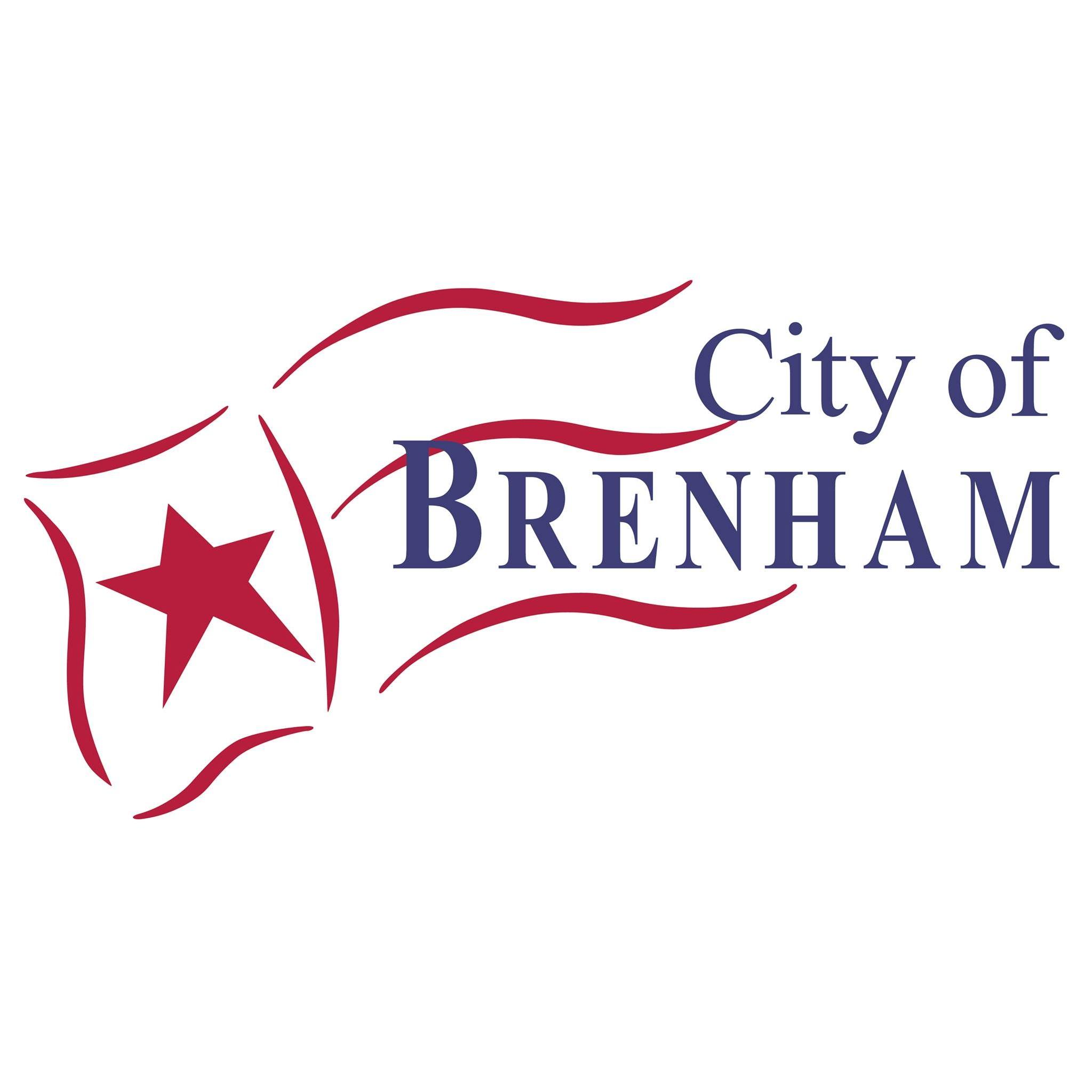
- Logo
- Etymology: Named in memory of Richard Fox Brenham
- Interactive map of Brenham, Texas
- Coordinates: 30°10′2″N 96°23′53″W
- Country: United States
- State: Texas
- County: Washington
- Established: 1844; 182 years ago
- Named for: Richard Fox Brenham

Government
  - Mayor: Atwood Kenjura
  - City Council: City Council members: Clint Kolby (Mayor Pro Tempore); Shannan Canales; Albert Wright; Leah Cook
  - City Manager: Carolyn Miller

Area
  - Total: 13.03 sq mi (33.74 km^{2})
  - Land: 12.98 sq mi (33.61 km^{2})
  - Water: 0.050 sq mi (0.13 km^{2})
- Elevation: 312 ft (95 m)

Population (2020)
  - Total: 17,369
  - Density: 1,376.5/sq mi (531.48/km^{2})
- Demonym: Brenhamite
- Time zone: UTC-6 (Central Standard Time)
  - Summer (DST): UTC-5 (Central Daylight Time)
- ZIP code: 77833
- PO box ZIP code: 77834
- Area code: 979
- FIPS code: 48-10156
- GNIS feature ID: 2409901
- Website: www.cityofbrenham.org

Brenham (/ˈbrɛnəm/ BREH-nəm) is a city in east-central Texas, United States, and the county seat of Washington County, with a population of 17,369 according to the 2020 U.S. census.

Brenham is also known for its annual German heritage festival that takes place each May called Maifest, similar to Volksfest. Numerous German immigrants settled here in the mid-19th century, following the revolutions in German states in 1848.

== History ==
The area surrounding Brenham was occupied by various Native American tribes through the 19th century. The Brenham area was part of the Old Three Hundred, the first authorized colonization of Texas by Anglo-Americans led by Stephen F. Austin. In the 1820s and 1830s, several small communities developed in the area. In 1843, the Hickory Grove community was renamed Brenham in memory of a local physician, Richard Fox Brenham, who died while serving in the Texian militia during the Mier Expedition. On February 4, 1844, Washington County voters selected Brenham to become the county seat. German immigrants settled in Brenham as early as 1846. With the exception of the Civil War years, the German-born population of Brenham increased throughout the second half of the 19th century. The largest numbers of German immigrants arrived between 1880 and 1883. Jewish immigrants to Brenham established one of Texas' first Orthodox synagogues in 1885, which was relocated to Austin in 2015.

== Geography ==
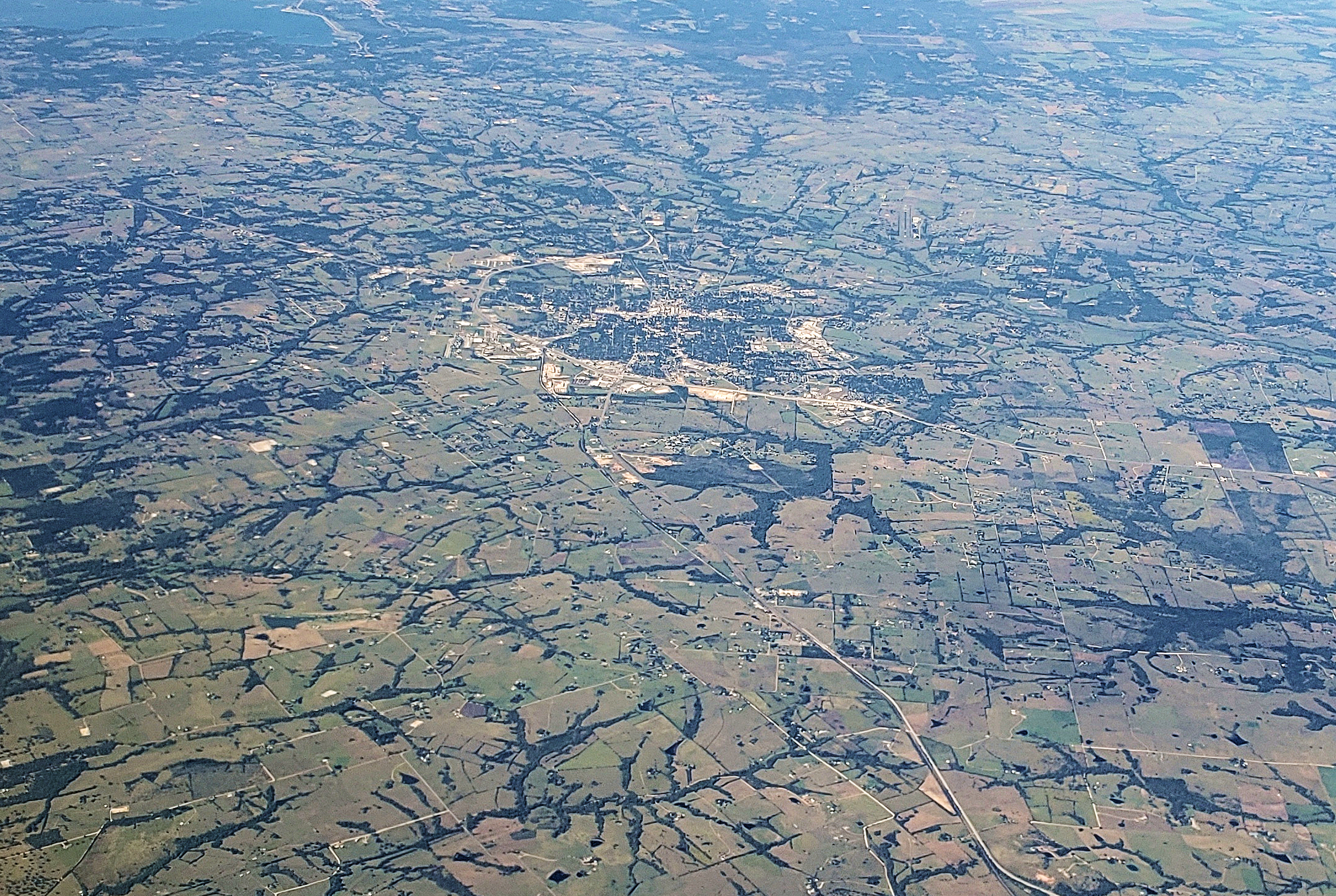
Aerial photo of Brenham, Texas

According to the United States Census Bureau, the city has a total area of 8.8 square miles (22.7 km^{2}), all land.

=== Climate ===
The climate in this area is characterized by relatively high temperatures and evenly distributed precipitation throughout the year. The Köppen climate classification describes the weather as humid subtropical, Cfa.

Climate data for Brenham, Texas (1991–2020 normals, extremes 1897–present)
Month	Jan	Feb	Mar	Apr	May	Jun	Jul	Aug	Sep	Oct	Nov	Dec	Year
Record high °F (°C)	87 (31)	94 (34)	97 (36)	98 (37)	101 (38)	105 (41)	109 (43)	111 (44)	113 (45)	99 (37)	97 (36)	87 (31)	113 (45)
Mean maximum °F (°C)	78.1 (25.6)	80.3 (26.8)	85.4 (29.7)	88.8 (31.6)	92.9 (33.8)	97.2 (36.2)	99.5 (37.5)	101.4 (38.6)	98.1 (36.7)	92.2 (33.4)	84.5 (29.2)	79.7 (26.5)	102.4 (39.1)
Mean daily maximum °F (°C)	60.8 (16.0)	64.4 (18.0)	71.0 (21.7)	78.1 (25.6)	84.8 (29.3)	90.9 (32.7)	93.7 (34.3)	95.0 (35.0)	89.8 (32.1)	81.4 (27.4)	70.1 (21.2)	62.5 (16.9)	78.5 (25.8)
Daily mean °F (°C)	50.2 (10.1)	53.7 (12.1)	60.1 (15.6)	67.4 (19.7)	74.9 (23.8)	81.2 (27.3)	83.8 (28.8)	84.4 (29.1)	79.1 (26.2)	69.9 (21.1)	59.1 (15.1)	51.9 (11.1)	68.0 (20.0)
Mean daily minimum °F (°C)	39.6 (4.2)	43.0 (6.1)	49.2 (9.6)	56.6 (13.7)	65.0 (18.3)	71.6 (22.0)	73.8 (23.2)	73.7 (23.2)	68.4 (20.2)	58.5 (14.7)	48.2 (9.0)	41.3 (5.2)	57.4 (14.1)
Mean minimum °F (°C)	25.8 (−3.4)	29.8 (−1.2)	33.8 (1.0)	42.4 (5.8)	50.7 (10.4)	64.6 (18.1)	70.1 (21.2)	69.3 (20.7)	56.8 (13.8)	43.1 (6.2)	33.0 (0.6)	28.0 (−2.2)	23.4 (−4.8)
Record low °F (°C)	−2 (−19)	0 (−18)	17 (−8)	32 (0)	41 (5)	53 (12)	58 (14)	59 (15)	43 (6)	29 (−2)	21 (−6)	4 (−16)	−2 (−19)
Average precipitation inches (mm)	3.66 (93)	3.36 (85)	3.63 (92)	3.56 (90)	5.39 (137)	4.46 (113)	2.58 (66)	3.83 (97)	4.59 (117)	5.07 (129)	4.21 (107)	3.69 (94)	48.03 (1,220)
Average precipitation days (≥ 0.01 in)	9.6	9.0	8.6	7.1	7.3	7.5	5.8	6.3	7.0	6.7	7.7	8.8	91.4
Source: NOAA

== Demographics ==
Historical population
Census	Pop.	Note	%±
1860	920		—
1870	2,221		141.4%
1880	4,101		84.6%
1890	5,209		27.0%
1900	5,968		14.6%
1910	4,718		−20.9%
1920	5,066		7.4%
1930	5,974		17.9%
1940	6,435		7.7%
1950	6,941		7.9%
1960	7,740		11.5%
1970	8,922		15.3%
1980	10,966		22.9%
1990	11,952		9.0%
2000	13,507		13.0%
2010	15,716		16.4%
2020	17,369		10.5%
2022 (est.)	18,469		6.3%
U.S. Decennial Census

=== Racial and ethnic composition ===
Brenham, Texas – Racial and ethnic composition Note: the US Census treats Hispanic/Latino as an ethnic category. This table excludes Latinos from the racial categories and assigns them to a separate category. Hispanics/Latinos may be of any race.
Race / Ethnicity (NH = Non-Hispanic)	Pop 2000	Pop 2010	Pop 2020	% 2000	% 2010	% 2020
White alone (NH)	8,842	9,186	8,820	65.46%	58.45%	50.78%
Black or African American alone (NH)	2,922	3,656	3,841	21.63%	23.26%	22.11%
Native American or Alaska Native alone (NH)	18	27	36	0.13%	0.17%	0.21%
Asian alone (NH)	249	277	434	1.84%	1.76%	2.50%
Pacific Islander alone (NH)	1	6	14	0.01%	0.04%	0.08%
Some Other Race alone (NH)	4	21	62	0.03%	0.13%	0.36%
Mixed Race or Multi-Racial (NH)	87	146	534	0.64%	0.93%	3.07%
Hispanic or Latino (any race)	1,384	2,397	3,628	10.25%	15.25%	20.89%
Total	13,507	15,716	17,369	100.00%	100.00%	100.00%

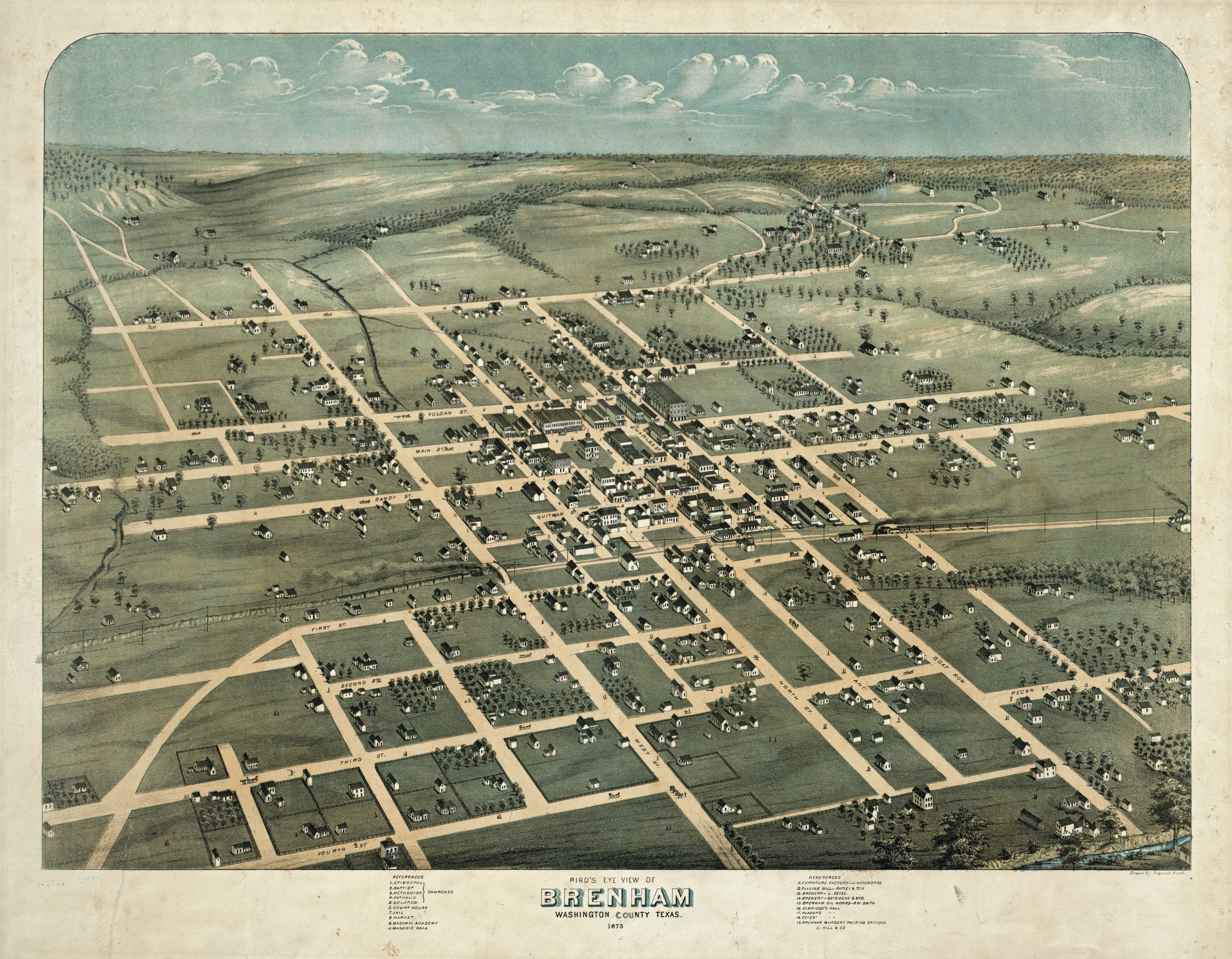
Map, 1873

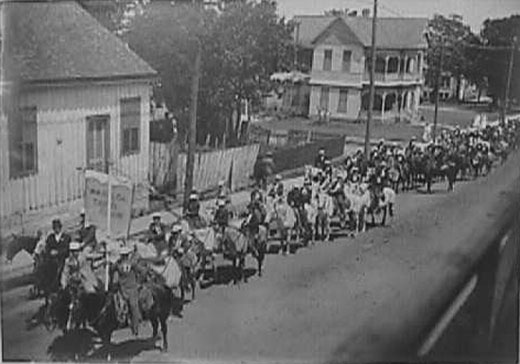
Washington County Boys' Corn Club mounted and in parade, 1910

=== 2020 census ===
As of the 2020 census, Brenham had a population of 17,369, 6,448 households, and 3,606 families. The median age was 35.2 years; 22.0% of the residents were under 18 and 19.4% were 65 or older. For every 100 females, there were 92.9 males, and for every 100 females 18 and over, there were 89.5 males age 18 and over.

Almost all of the residents lived in urban areas, while 3.0% lived in rural areas.

Of the 6,448 households in Brenham, 30.7% had children under 18 living in them, 40.6% were married-couple households, 18.3% were households with a male householder and no spouse or partner present, and 36.4% were households with a female householder and no spouse or partner present. About 34.3% of all households were made up of individuals, and 17.7% had someone living alone who was 65 or older.

The city had 7,254 housing units, of which 11.1% were vacant. Among occupied housing units, 56.8% were owner-occupied and 43.2% were renter-occupied. The homeowner vacancy rate was 2.0% and the rental vacancy rate was 9.9%.

Racial composition as of the 2020 census
Race	Percentage
White	54.7%
Black or African American	22.4%
American Indian and Alaska Native	0.5%
Asian	2.6%
Native Hawaiian and other Pacific Islander	0.1%
Some other race	6.9%
Two or more races	12.8%
Hispanic or Latino (of any race)	20.9%

=== 2000 census ===
As of the census of 2000, 13,507 people, 4,907 households, and 3,115 families lived in the city. The population density was 1,541.5 inhabitants per square mile (595.2/km^{2}). The 5,317 housing units had an average density of 606.8 per square mile (234.3/km^{2}). The racial makeup of the city was 69.99% White, 21.91% African American, 0.25% Native American, 1.86% Asian, 4.76% from other races, and 1.22% from two or more races. Hispanics or Latinos of any race were 10.25% of the population.

Of the 4,907 households, 30.0% had children under 18 living with them, 45.7% were married couples living together, 14.2% had a female householder with no husband present, and 36.5% were not families. About 30.7% of all households were made up of individuals, and 15.4% had someone living alone who was 65 or older. The average household size was 2.40, and the average family size was 3.01.

In the city, the age distribution was 22.5% under 18, 15.9% from 18 to 24, 24.7% from 25 to 44, 18.8% from 45 to 64, and 18.2% who were 65 or older. The median age was 35 years. For every 100 females, there were 89.1 males. For every 100 females 18 and over, there were 86.6 males.

The median income for a household in the city was $32,198, and for a family was $41,486. Males had a median income of $31,133 versus $22,152 for females. The per capita income for the city was $15,351. About 12.8% of families and 17.7% of the population were below the poverty line, including 21.9% of those under age 18 and 20.7% of those age 65 or over.

== Economy ==
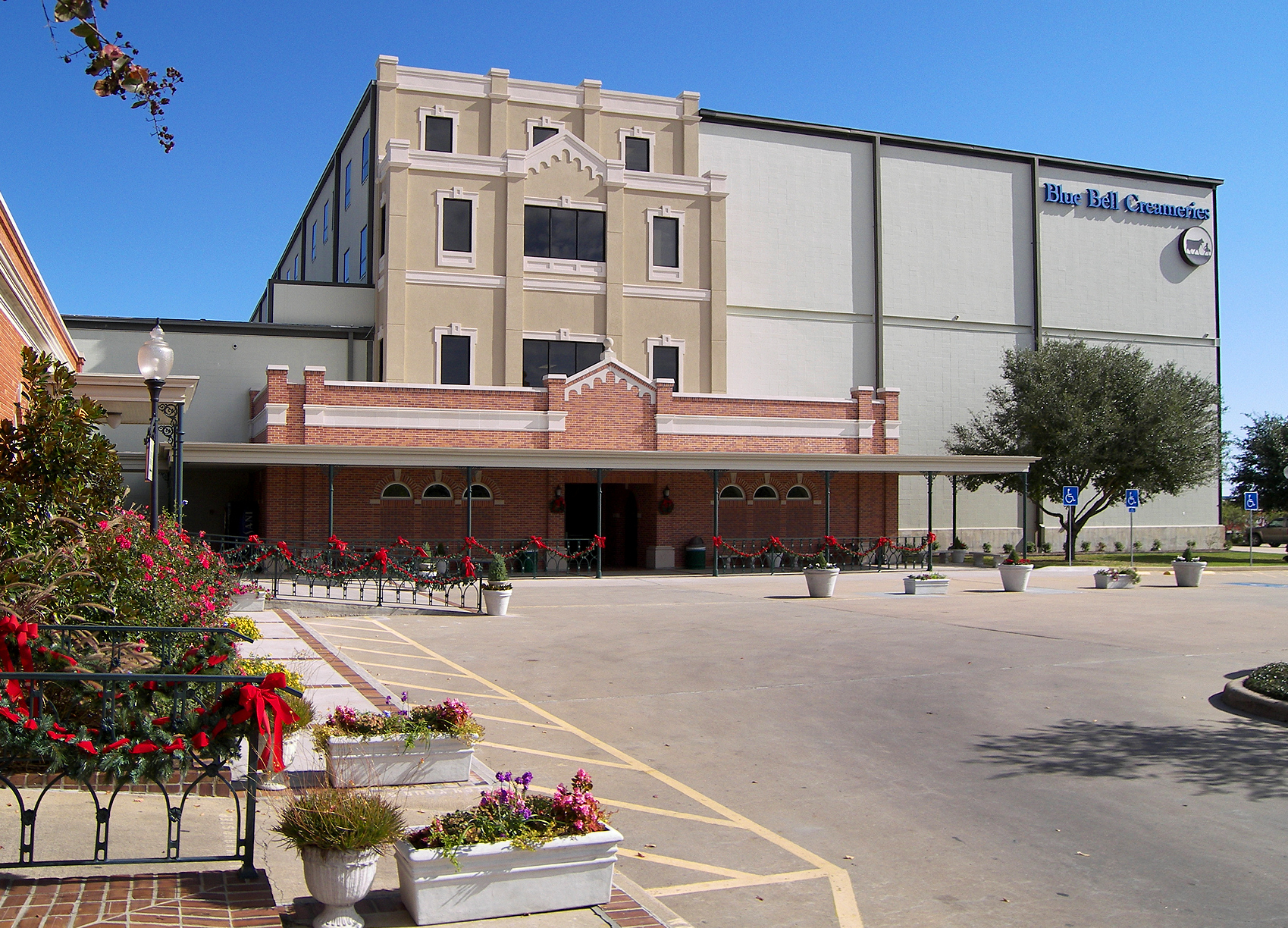
The Blue Bell Creameries factory in Brenham

Brenham is the home of and headquarters for Blue Bell Creameries. Blue Bell is the fourth-best-selling ice cream brand in the United States and is sold in 16 states.

Brenham is also home to a large Valmont Industries industrial plant, where metal poles are manufactured. Brenham is also the home of "the World's Largest BBQ Pit" on US 290 West.

The Texas Department of Aging and Disability Services operates the Brenham State Supported Living Center (formerly Brenham State School), the largest facility in Texas for providing housing and care to intellectually disabled persons.

== Government ==
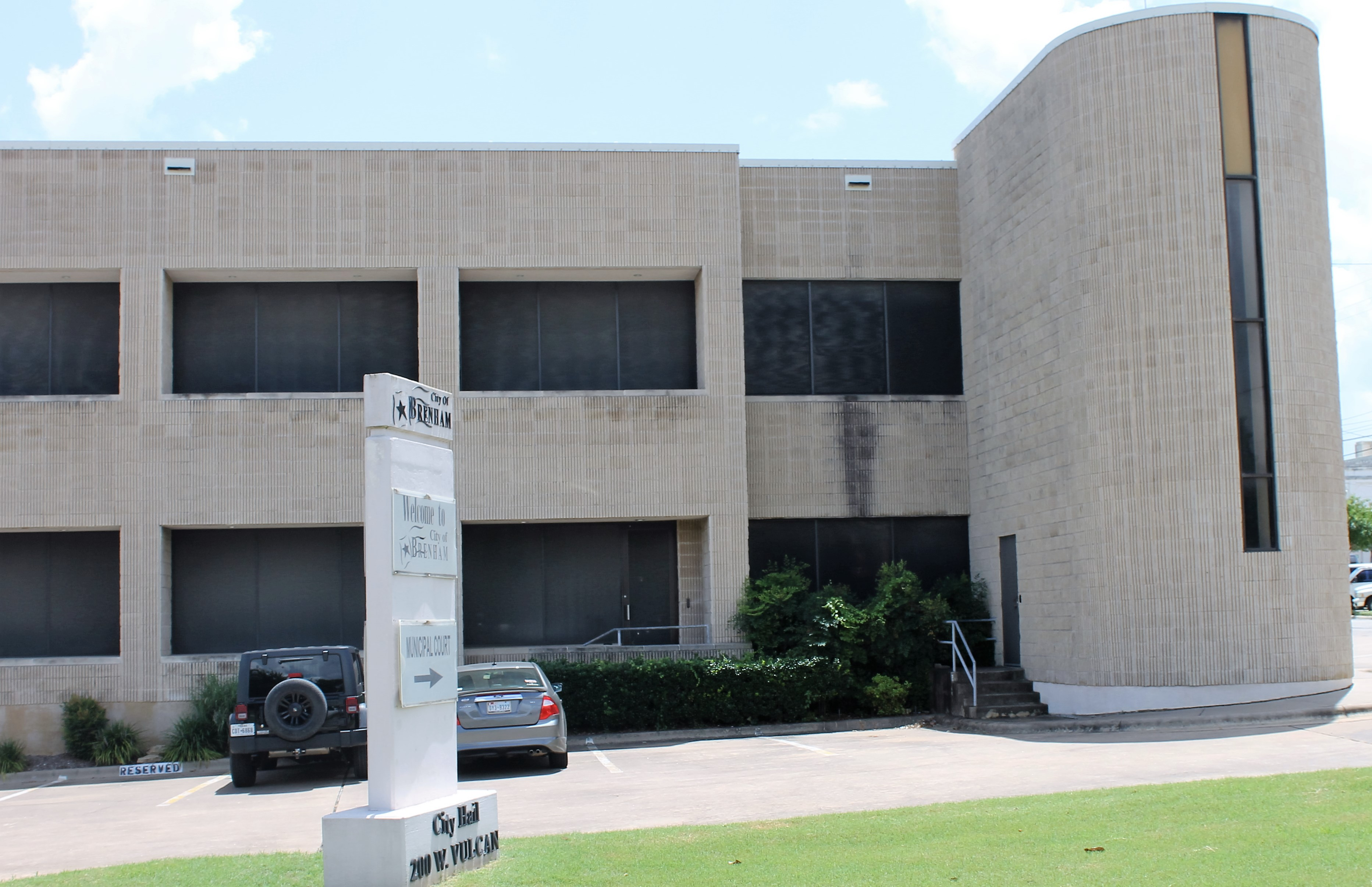
City hall and municipal court

The city operates as a council–manager government; as such, it elects its mayor and city council, who then appoint a city manager. The mayor is elected by the city at large, while the city council is elected by ward, with four wards, and each ward elects a single city council member. Two additional council members are elected from the city at-large. The mayor and city council members serve four-year terms.

== Education ==
The City of Brenham's primary education is provided by Brenham Independent School District (Brenham ISD) and various private schools. The public schools in Brenham ISD include Brenham Elementary School, Krause Elementary School, Alton Elementary School, Brenham Middle School, Brenham Junior High School, and Brenham High School. Brenham High School's mascot is the lion cub.

The traditional role of middle school is split in two in Brenham, with fifth and sixth graders attending Brenham Middle School and seventh and eighth graders attending Brenham Junior High School. In 2022, Brenham ISD proposed a project to tear down and rebuild Brenham Junior High School to be able to handle the sixth through 8th grades, then convert Brenham Middle School into a fourth elementary school serving students up to fifth grade, but this proposal was rejected by voters.

Blinn College, the oldest county-owned junior college in Texas, is located in Brenham. Blinn has campuses also in Bryan, Schulenburg, and Sealy.

== Infrastructure ==
The following highways pass through Brenham:

- US 290
- SH 105
- SH 36
- FM 389
- FM 577

The Galveston Subdivision of the BNSF Railway passes through Brenham, with spurs serving Valmont Industries and Blue Bell Creameries. The Blue Bell spur was formerly part of a separate Southern Pacific line between Austin and Houston, though it now terminates within Brenham on both ends.

== Notable people ==
- Aubrey Graham aka Drake (born 1986), Rapper, actor, entrepreneur
- Malcom Brown (born 1994), professional football player
- Timothy Brian Cole (1960–1999), The first person in Texas to receive a posthumous pardon and the first posthumous DNA Exonerated person in the United States
- Cecil Cooper (born 1949), professional baseball player
- William Ezell (1892–1963), barrelhouse pianist
- Hosea Garrett (1800–1888), clergyman, cofounder of Baylor University
- Othello Maria Harris-Jefferson (1905–1988), professor of education, Bluefield State University
- Jack Heidemann (born 1949), professional baseball player
- Don Imus (1940–2019), radio and TV personality, recording artist and author
- Blind Willie Johnson (1897–1945), singer, songwriter, guitarist
- Lois Kolkhorst (born 1964), state politician, state representative from Brenham from 2001 to 2015, and state senator since 2015
- Roosevelt Leaks (born 1953), professional football player
- Lucas Luetge (born 1987), professional baseball pitcher
- Chuck Machemehl (born 1946), professional baseball player
- Frank Malina (1912–1981), aeronautical engineer and director of NASA's Jet Propulsion Laboratory, entrepreneur, rocket researcher, artist
- Louise Martin (1914–1955), photographer
- Teaira McCowan (born 1996), WNBA, plays for Dallas Wings
- Roger Metzger, professional baseball player, Houston Astros
- Paul Pressler (born 1930), retired judge from Houston; owns Hidden Hills Ranch near Brenham
- Luke Sanders (born 1985), UFC fighter
- Austin Schlottmann (born 1995), professional football player (Denver Broncos 2018–current)
- Ricky Seilheimer (born 1960), professional baseball player
- Sadie Sink (born 2002), actress
- Darden Smith (born 1962), songwriter, musician
- Courtland Sutton (born 1995), professional football player (Denver Broncos 2018–current)
- Gary Weiss (born 1955), former shortstop for the Los Angeles Dodgers
- Wilson Whitley (1955–1992), professional football player

== See also ==
- History of the Jews in Brenham, Texas
- National Register of Historic Places listings in Washington County, Texas
- Brenham Heritage Museum
