= Little House =

Little House may refer to:

== Arts and entertainment ==
- The Little House (picture book), a 1942 children's picture book by Virginia Lee Burton
- The Little House (novel), a 1996 novel by Philippa Gregory, adapted into a 2010 TV series
- The Little House (2014 film), a Japanese drama film
- The Little House (1950 film), a Mexican drama film
- The Little House (1952 film), a Disney adaptation of the 1942 picture book
- Little House on the Prairie (disambiguation), often referred to as simply "Little House", a series of novels and related works
- Little House (EP), by Rachel Chinouriri, 2025
- "Little House", a song by the Fray from How to Save a Life, 2005
- "Little House", a song by Amanda Seyfried from the soundtrack of the film Dear John, 2010

== Places ==
=== United States ===
- Little-Stabler House in Greenville, Alabama (listed on the National Register of Historic Places (NRHP) in Butler County, Alabama)
- J.E. Little House in Conway, Arkansas (NRHP-listed)
- Jim Little House in Bradford, Arkansas (NRHP-listed)
- Ayers-Little Boarding House in Carnesville, Georgia (listed on the NRHP in Franklin County, Georgia)
- Thomas K. Little House in Caldwell, Idaho (NRHP-listed)
- Little Brick House in Vandalia, Illinois (NRHP-listed)
- Little Loomhouses in or near Louisville, Kentucky (NRHP-listed)
- Edward Little House in Auburn, Maine (NRHP-listed)
- Spencer–Peirce–Little Farm in Newbury, Massachusetts (NRHP-listed)
- Arthur D. Little Inc., Building in Cambridge, Massachusetts (NRHP-listed)
- Ball Road-Little Salt Creek Bridge in Jasper Township, Michigan (NRHP-listed)
- Alford-Little House in Georgetown, Mississippi (listed on the NRHP in Copiah County, Mississippi)
- Dr. William Little House in Wesson, Mississippi (listed on the NRHP in Copiah County, Mississippi)
- America's Little House, former demonstration house in Manhattan, New York
- Russell M. Little House in Glens Falls, New York (NRHP-listed)
- Little House (Palisades, New York) (NRHP-listed)
- John Phillips Little House in Little's Mills, North Carolina (NRHP-listed)
- Little Manor in Littleton, North Carolina (NRHP-listed)
- W. J. Little House in Robersonville, North Carolina (NRHP-listed)
- Boggan-Hammond House and Alexander Little Wing in Wadesboro, North Carolina (NRHP-listed)
- Moses Little Tavern in Laboratory, Pennsylvania (NRHP-listed)
- Martin-Little House in Phoenixville, Pennsylvania (NRHP-listed)
- Doak–Little House in South Strabane Township, Pennsylvania (NRHP-listed)
- Beaty-Little House in Conway, South Carolina (NRHP-listed)
- Smith-Little-Mars House in Speedwell, Tennessee (NRHP-listed)
- Little House (Victoria, Texas) (NRHP-listed)
- Lake-Little House in Port Townsend, Washington (listed on the NRHP in Jefferson County, Washington)
- Little House (Shepherdstown, West Virginia) in the Shepherdstown Historic District

=== Elsewhere ===
- Little House, Meersburg, a historic house and museum in Meersburg, Germany
- Royal Infirmary of Edinburgh, earlier known as Little House, in Edinburgh, Scotland, UK

== See also ==
- Little Sisters of the Poor Home for the Aged (disambiguation)
- Small House (disambiguation)
- Tiny-house movement
