= Family Affair =

Family Affair(s) or A Family Affair may refer to:

== Television ==
=== Series ===
- A Family Affair (TV series), a 2022 Filipino drama series created by ABS-CBN
- Family Affair (1966 TV series), a 1966–1971 American sitcom starring Brian Keith and Sebastian Cabot
- Family Affair (2002 TV series), a remake of the 1966 series which aired on the WB
- Family Affairs (1949 TV serial), a BBC serial
- Family Affairs (1959 TV programme), a BBC discussion programme
- Family Affairs, a 1997–2005 British soap opera

=== Episodes ===
- "Family Affair" (American Dad!), 2009
- "A Family Affair" (The Colbys), 1986
- "Family Affair" (CSI), 2009
- "Family Affair" (The Following), 2014
- "A Family Affair" (Frankie Drake Mysteries), 2021
- "A Family Affair" (Get a Life), 1990
- "Family Affair" (The Golden Girls), 1986
- "Family Affair" (Grey's Anatomy), 2016
- "Family Affairs" (I, Claudius), 1976
- "A Family Affair" (Kavanagh QC), 1995
- "A Family Affair" (Silver Spoons), 1986
- "Family Affair" (Three's a Crowd), 1984
- "Family/Affair", an episode of Ugly Betty, 2001

== Film ==
- A Family Affair (1920 film), a Krazy Kat animated film
- A Family Affair (1937 film), an American film, the first in the Andy Hardy series
- A Family Affair (1984 film), a Hong Kong comedy-drama film
- A Family Affair (2001 film), an LGBT-related film
- Family Affair (film), a 2010 American documentary by Chico Colvard
- A Family Affair (2024 film), an American romantic comedy

== Books ==
- A Family Affair, a 1958 novel by Rosamunde Pilcher under the pen name Jane Fraser
- A Family Affair, a 1969 novel by Michael Innes
- A Family Affair, a 1971 novel by Madeleine A. Polland
- A Family Affair, a 1974 novel by Charlotte Lamb
- A Family Affair (novel), a 1975 Nero Wolfe novel by Rex Stout
- A Family Affair, a novelization of the 1979 BBC television series by N. J. Crisp
- A Family Affair, a 1989 novel by Katie Flynn under the pen name Judith Saxton
- A Family Affair, a 1995 novel by Anne Cassidy, the first installment in the East End Murder series
- A Family Affair, a 2003 novel by Marcus Major
- A Family Affair, a 2013 novel by ReShonda Tate Billingsley
- A Family Affair, a 2014 novel by Fern Michaels
- A Family Affair, a 2022 novel by Robyn Carr
- Family Affair, a 1981 novel by Mignon G. Eberhart
- Family Affair, a 1988 novel by Cathy Gillen Thacker
- Family Affair, a 1991 novel by Katherine Applegate under the pen name L. E. Blair, the 19th installment in the Girl Talk book series
- Family Affair, a 1994 novel by Debbie Macomber
- Family Affair, a 2005 YA novel by Alice Alfonsi, the fifth novel based on the Disney Channel television series That's So Raven
- Family Affair, a 2009 novel by Caprice Crane
- Family Affairs (novel), a 1950 novel by Cecil Street under the pen name John Rhode
- Family Affairs, a 1974 short story collection by John L'Heureux
- Family Affairs, a 1979 novel by Catherine Gaskin
- Family Affairs, a 1999 novel by Sandra Kitt
- Family Affairs and Ships and Things, a 1947 novel by Anne Hepple

== Music ==
=== Albums ===
- Family Affair (The Bear Quartet album), 1993
- Family Affair (MC Hammer album), 1998
- Family Affair (Philip Bailey album), 1989
- A Family Affair (Christian McBride album), 1998
- A Family Affair (Mikael Bolyos album), 2007

=== Songs ===
- "Family Affair" (Mary J. Blige song), 2001
- "Family Affair" (Sly and the Family Stone song), 1971

=== Other ===
- A Family Affair (musical), a 1962 Broadway musical

== See also ==
- A Family's Affairs, a 1962 novel by Ellen Douglas
