= Top-rated United States television programs by season =

Top-rated TV programs in the U.S.

This article presents the top-rated American primetime broadcast network television series by season from 1950 to the present according to Nielsen Media Research.

== 1950s ==
October 1950–April 1951

Rank	Program	Network	Rating
1	Texaco Star Theater	NBC	61.6
2	Fireside Theatre	NBC	52.6
3	Philco TV Playhouse	NBC	45.3
4	Your Show of Shows	NBC	42.6
5	The Colgate Comedy Hour	NBC	42.0
6	Gillette Cavalcade of Sports	NBC	41.3
7	The Lone Ranger	ABC	41.2
8	Arthur Godfrey's Talent Scouts	CBS	40.6
9	Hopalong Cassidy	NBC	39.9
10	Mama	CBS	39.7
11	Robert Montgomery Presents	NBC	38.8
12	Martin Kane, Private Eye	NBC	37.8
13	Man Against Crime	CBS	37.4
14	Kraft Television Theatre	NBC	37.0
15	The Toast of the Town	CBS	36.5
16	The Aldrich Family	NBC	36.1
17	You Bet Your Life	NBC	36.0
18	Arthur Godfrey and His Friends	CBS	35.9
19	Armstrong Circle Theatre	NBC	35.6
19	Lights Out	NBC	35.6
19	Big Town	CBS	35.6
22	The Alan Young Show	CBS	34.4
23	Stop the Music	ABC	34.0
24	Studio One	CBS	33.8
25	The Big Story	NBC	33.7
26	Pabst Blue Ribbon Bouts	CBS	33.4
26	The Original Amateur Hour	NBC	33.4
28	The Ken Murray Show	CBS	32.1
29	Your Hit Parade	NBC	32.0
30	Lux Video Theatre	CBS	31.5
30	The Speidel Show	NBC	31.5

October 1951–April 1952

Rank	Program	Network	Rating
1	Arthur Godfrey's Talent Scouts	CBS	53.8
2	Texaco Star Theater	NBC	52.0
3	I Love Lucy	CBS	50.9
4	The Red Skelton Show	NBC	50.2
5	The Colgate Comedy Hour	NBC	45.3
6	Arthur Godfrey and His Friends	CBS	43.3
7	Fireside Theatre	NBC	43.1
8	Your Show of Shows	NBC	43.0
9	The Jack Benny Show	CBS	42.8
10	You Bet Your Life	NBC	42.1
11	Mama	CBS	41.3
12	Philco TV Playhouse	NBC	40.4
13	Amos 'n' Andy	CBS	38.9
14	Gangbusters	NBC	38.7
15	Big Town	CBS	38.5
16	Goodyear TV Playhouse	NBC	37.8
17	Pabst Blue Ribbon Bouts	CBS	37.5
18	The Lone Ranger	ABC	36.8
19	Gillette Cavalcade of Sports	NBC	36.5
20	All Star Revue	NBC	36.3
20	Dragnet	NBC	36.3
22	The Alan Young Show	CBS	35.8
23	Kraft Television Theatre	NBC	34.8
24	Armstrong Circle Theatre	NBC	34.7
25	Strike It Rich	CBS	34.5
26	Robert Montgomery Presents	NBC	34.4
27	The Roy Rogers Show	NBC	32.7
28	Hopalong Cassidy	NBC	32.2
29	Man Against Crime	CBS	32.0
29	Racket Squad	CBS	32.0

October 1952–April 1953

Rank	Program	Network	Rating
1	I Love Lucy	CBS	67.3
2	Arthur Godfrey's Talent Scouts	CBS	54.7
3	Arthur Godfrey and His Friends	CBS	47.1
4	Dragnet	NBC	46.8
5	Texaco Star Theater	NBC	46.7
6	The Buick Circus Hour	NBC	46.0
7	The Colgate Comedy Hour	NBC	44.3
8	Gangbusters	NBC	42.4
9	You Bet Your Life	NBC	41.6
10	Fireside Theatre	NBC	40.6
11	The Red Buttons Show	CBS	40.2
12	The Jack Benny Show	CBS	39.0
13	Life with Luigi	CBS	38.5
14	Pabst Blue Ribbon Bouts	CBS	37.9
15	Goodyear TV Playhouse	NBC	37.8
16	The Life of Riley	NBC	37.4
17	Philco TV Playhouse	NBC	37.3
18	Mama	CBS	37.0
19	Your Show of Shows	NBC	36.0
20	What's My Line?	CBS	35.3
20	Strike It Rich	CBS	35.3
22	Our Miss Brooks	CBS	35.0
22	The Big Story	NBC	35.0
24	Gillette Cavalcade of Sports	NBC	34.7
25	Amos 'n' Andy	CBS	34.4
26	All Star Revue	NBC	34.3
27	Treasury Men in Action	NBC	34.2
28	The Red Skelton Show	NBC	33.7
28	The Lone Ranger	ABC	33.7
30	Ford Theatre	NBC	33.6

October 1953–April 1954

Rank	Program	Network	Rating
1	I Love Lucy	CBS	58.8
2	Dragnet	NBC	53.2
3	Arthur Godfrey's Talent Scouts	CBS	43.6
3	You Bet Your Life	NBC	43.6
5	The Milton Berle Show	NBC	40.2
6	Arthur Godfrey and His Friends	CBS	38.9
7	Ford Theatre	NBC	38.8
8	The Jackie Gleason Show	CBS	38.1
9	Fireside Theatre	NBC	36.4
10	The Colgate Comedy Hour	NBC	36.2
10	This Is Your Life	NBC	36.2
12	The Red Buttons Show	CBS	35.3
13	The Life of Riley	NBC	35.0
14	Our Miss Brooks	CBS	34.2
15	Treasury Men in Action	NBC	33.9
16	The Jack Benny Show	CBS	33.3
17	The Toast of the Town	CBS	33.0
18	Gillette Cavalcade of Sports	NBC	32.7
19	Philco TV Playhouse	NBC	32.5
20	The George Burns and Gracie Allen Show	CBS	32.4
21	Kraft Television Theatre	NBC	31.3
22	Goodyear TV Playhouse	NBC	31.0
23	Pabst Blue Ribbon Bouts	CBS	30.9
24	Private Secretary	CBS	30.3
25	I Married Joan	NBC	30.2
25	Mama	CBS	30.2
27	General Electric Theater	CBS	29.9
28	What's My Line?	CBS	29.6
29	The Big Story	NBC	29.5
29	Martin Kane, Private Eye	NBC	29.5
29	Your Hit Parade	NBC	29.5

October 1954–April 1955

Rank	Program	Network	Rating
1	I Love Lucy	CBS	49.3
2	The Jackie Gleason Show	CBS	42.4
3	Dragnet	NBC	42.1
4	You Bet Your Life	NBC	41.0
5	The Toast of the Town	CBS	39.6
6	Disneyland	ABC	39.1
7	The Jack Benny Show	CBS	38.3
8	The George Gobel Show	NBC	35.2
9	Ford Theatre	NBC	34.9
10	December Bride	CBS	34.7
11	The Buick-Berle Show	NBC	34.6
12	This Is Your Life	NBC	34.5
13	I've Got a Secret	CBS	34.0
14	Two for the Money	CBS	33.9
15	Your Hit Parade	NBC	33.6
16	The Millionaire	CBS	33.0
17	General Electric Theater	CBS	32.6
18	Arthur Godfrey's Talent Scouts	CBS	32.5
19	Private Secretary	CBS	32.2
20	Fireside Theatre	NBC	31.1
21	The Life of Riley	NBC	30.9
22	Arthur Godfrey and His Friends	CBS	29.8
23	The Adventures of Rin Tin Tin	ABC	29.5
24	Topper	CBS	29.4
25	Pabst Blue Ribbon Bouts	CBS	29.1
26	The George Burns and Gracie Allen Show	CBS	29.0
27	The Colgate Comedy Hour	NBC	28.0
28	The Loretta Young Show	NBC	27.7
29	My Little Margie	NBC	27.1
30	The Roy Rogers Show	NBC	26.9

October 1955–April 1956

Rank	Program	Network	Rating
1	The $64,000 Question	CBS	47.5
2	I Love Lucy	CBS	46.1
3	The Ed Sullivan Show	CBS	39.5
4	Disneyland	ABC	37.4
5	The Jack Benny Show	CBS	37.2
6	December Bride	CBS	37.0
7	You Bet Your Life	NBC	35.4
8	Dragnet	NBC	35.0
9	The Millionaire	CBS	33.8
10	I've Got a Secret	CBS	33.5
11	General Electric Theater	CBS	32.9
12	Private Secretary	CBS	32.4
12	Ford Theatre	NBC	32.4
14	The Red Skelton Show	CBS	32.3
15	The George Gobel Show	NBC	31.9
16	Arthur Godfrey's Talent Scouts	CBS	31.1
17	The Lineup	CBS	30.8
18	The Perry Como Show	NBC	30.3
19	The Honeymooners	CBS	30.2
20	The Adventures of Robin Hood	CBS	30.1
21	The Life of Riley	NBC	29.9
22	Climax!	CBS	29.6
23	Your Hit Parade	NBC	29.1
24	Fireside Theatre	NBC	29.0
25	Lux Video Theatre	NBC	28.9
26	This Is Your Life	NBC	28.8
27	People Are Funny	NBC	28.4
27	The George Burns and Gracie Allen Show	CBS	28.4
29	The Chevy Show	NBC	28.2
30	The Phil Silvers Show	CBS	28.1

October 1956–April 1957

Rank	Program	Network	Rating
1	I Love Lucy	CBS	43.7
2	The Ed Sullivan Show	CBS	38.4
3	General Electric Theater	CBS	36.9
4	The $64,000 Question	CBS	36.4
5	December Bride	CBS	35.2
6	Alfred Hitchcock Presents	CBS	33.9
7	I've Got a Secret	CBS	32.7
7	Gunsmoke	CBS	32.7
9	The Perry Como Show	NBC	32.6
10	The Jack Benny Show	CBS	32.3
11	Dragnet	NBC	32.1
12	Arthur Godfrey's Talent Scouts	CBS	31.9
13	The Millionaire	CBS	31.8
13	Disneyland	ABC	31.8
15	The Red Skelton Show	CBS	31.4
15	The Lineup	CBS	31.4
17	You Bet Your Life	NBC	31.1
18	The Life and Legend of Wyatt Earp	ABC	31.0
19	The Ford Show	NBC	30.7
20	The Adventures of Robin Hood	CBS	30.3
21	People Are Funny	NBC	30.2
22	The $64,000 Challenge	CBS	29.7
22	The Phil Silvers Show	CBS	29.7
24	Lassie	CBS	29.5
25	Private Secretary	CBS	29.0
26	Climax!	CBS	28.9
26	What's My Line?	CBS	28.9
28	The George Burns and Gracie Allen Show	CBS	27.8
29	The Jackie Gleason Show	CBS	27.6
30	Name That Tune	CBS	27.2

October 1957–April 1958

Rank	Program	Network	Rating
1	Gunsmoke	CBS	43.1
2	The Danny Thomas Show	CBS	35.3
3	Tales of Wells Fargo	NBC	35.2
4	Have Gun – Will Travel	CBS	33.7
5	I've Got a Secret	CBS	33.4
6	The Life and Legend of Wyatt Earp	ABC	32.6
7	General Electric Theater	CBS	31.5
8	The Restless Gun	NBC	31.4
9	December Bride	CBS	30.7
10	You Bet Your Life	NBC	30.6
11	The Perry Como Show	NBC	30.5
12	Alfred Hitchcock Presents	CBS	30.3
12	Cheyenne	ABC	30.3
14	The Ford Show	NBC	29.7
15	The Red Skelton Show	CBS	28.9
16	The Gale Storm Show	CBS	28.8
17	The Millionaire	CBS	28.5
18	The Lineup	CBS	28.4
19	This Is Your Life	NBC	28.1
19	The $64,000 Question	CBS	28.1
21	Zane Grey Theater	CBS	27.9
22	Lassie	CBS	27.8
23	Wagon Train	NBC	27.7
23	Sugarfoot	ABC	27.7
23	Father Knows Best	NBC	27.7
26	Twenty-One	NBC	27.6
27	The Ed Sullivan Show	CBS	27.3
28	The Jack Benny Show	CBS	27.1
29	People Are Funny	NBC	27.0
30	The Loretta Young Show	NBC	26.6
30	Zorro	ABC	26.6
30	The Real McCoys	ABC	26.6

October 1958–April 1959

Rank	Program	Network	Rating
1	Gunsmoke	CBS	39.6
2	Wagon Train	NBC	36.1
3	Have Gun – Will Travel	CBS	34.3
4	The Rifleman	ABC	33.1
5	The Danny Thomas Show	CBS	32.8
6	Maverick	ABC	30.4
7	Tales of Wells Fargo	NBC	30.2
8	The Real McCoys	ABC	30.1
9	I've Got a Secret	CBS	29.8
10	The Life and Legend of Wyatt Earp	ABC	29.1
11	The Price Is Right	NBC	28.6
12	The Red Skelton Show	CBS	28.5
13	Zane Grey Theater	CBS	28.3
13	Father Knows Best	CBS	28.3
15	The Texan	CBS	28.2
16	Wanted: Dead or Alive	CBS	28.0
16	Peter Gunn	NBC	28.0
18	Cheyenne	ABC	27.9
19	Perry Mason	CBS	27.5
20	The Ford Show	NBC	27.2
21	Sugarfoot	ABC	27.0
21	The Ann Sothern Show	CBS	27.0
21	The Perry Como Show	NBC	27.0
24	Alfred Hitchcock Presents	CBS	26.8
25	Name That Tune	CBS	26.7
25	General Electric Theater	CBS	26.7
27	The Lawman	ABC	26.0
28	Rawhide	CBS	25.9
29	This Is Your Life	NBC	25.8
30	The Millionaire	CBS	25.6

October 1959–April 1960

Rank	Program	Network	Rating
1	Gunsmoke	CBS	40.3
2	Wagon Train	NBC	38.4
3	Have Gun – Will Travel	CBS	34.7
4	The Danny Thomas Show	CBS	31.1
5	The Red Skelton Show	CBS	30.8
6	Father Knows Best	CBS	29.7
6	77 Sunset Strip	ABC	29.7
8	The Price Is Right	NBC	29.2
9	Wanted: Dead or Alive	CBS	28.7
10	Perry Mason	CBS	28.3
11	The Real McCoys	ABC	28.2
12	The Ed Sullivan Show	CBS	28.0
13	The Rifleman	ABC	27.5
14	The Ford Show	NBC	27.4
15	The Lawman	ABC	26.2
16	Dennis the Menace	CBS	26.0
17	Cheyenne	ABC	25.9
18	Rawhide	CBS	25.8
19	Maverick	ABC	25.2
20	The Life and Legend of Wyatt Earp	ABC	25.0
21	Mr. Lucky	CBS	24.4
21	Zane Grey Theater	CBS	24.4
21	General Electric Theater	CBS	24.4
24	The Ann Sothern Show	CBS	24.2
25	Alfred Hitchcock Presents	CBS	24.1
26	You Bet Your Life	NBC	24.0
27	What's My Line?	CBS	23.9
28	I've Got a Secret	CBS	23.5
29	The Perry Como Show	NBC	23.1
29	Lassie	CBS	23.1

== 1960s ==
October 1960–April 1961

Rank	Program	Network	Rating
1	Gunsmoke	CBS	37.3
2	Wagon Train	NBC	34.2
3	Have Gun – Will Travel	CBS	30.9
4	The Andy Griffith Show	CBS	27.8
5	The Real McCoys	ABC	27.7
6	Rawhide	CBS	27.5
7	Candid Camera	CBS	27.3
8	The Untouchables	ABC	27.0
8	The Price Is Right	NBC	27.0
10	The Jack Benny Show	CBS	26.2
11	Dennis the Menace	CBS	26.1
12	The Danny Thomas Show	CBS	25.9
13	My Three Sons	ABC	25.8
13	77 Sunset Strip	ABC	25.8
15	The Ed Sullivan Show	CBS	25.0
16	Perry Mason	CBS	24.9
17	Bonanza	NBC	24.8
18	The Flintstones	ABC	24.3
19	The Red Skelton Show	CBS	24.0
20	General Electric Theater	CBS	23.4
21	Checkmate	CBS	23.2
22	What's My Line?	CBS	23.1
23	The Many Loves of Dobie Gillis	CBS	23.0
24	The Ford Show	NBC	22.9
25	The Garry Moore Show	CBS	22.7
26	The Lawman	ABC	22.3
27	The Rifleman	ABC	22.1
28	Cheyenne	ABC	22.0
29	Peter Gunn	NBC	21.9
30	Route 66	CBS	21.7

October 1961–April 1962

Rank	Program	Network	Rating
1	Wagon Train	NBC	32.1
2	Bonanza	NBC	30.0
3	Gunsmoke	CBS	28.3
4	Hazel	NBC	27.7
5	Perry Mason	CBS	27.3
6	The Red Skelton Show	CBS	27.1
7	The Andy Griffith Show	CBS	27.0
8	The Danny Thomas Show	CBS	26.1
9	Dr. Kildare	NBC	25.6
10	Candid Camera	CBS	25.5
11	My Three Sons	ABC	24.7
12	The Garry Moore Show	CBS	24.6
13	Rawhide	CBS	24.5
14	The Real McCoys	ABC	24.2
15	Lassie	CBS	24.0
15	Sing Along with Mitch	NBC	24.0
17	Dennis the Menace	CBS	23.8
18	Ben Casey	ABC	23.7
19	The Ed Sullivan Show	CBS	23.5
20	Car 54, Where Are You?	NBC	23.2
21	The Flintstones	ABC	22.9
21	The Many Loves of Dobie Gillis	CBS	22.9
23	Walt Disney's Wonderful World of Color	NBC	22.7
24	The Joey Bishop Show	NBC	22.6
25	The Perry Como Show	NBC	22.5
26	The Defenders	CBS	22.4
27	The Price Is Right	NBC	22.3
27	The Rifleman	ABC	22.3
29	Have Gun – Will Travel	CBS	22.2
30	The Donna Reed Show	ABC	21.9
30	77 Sunset Strip	ABC	21.9

October 1962–April 1963

Rank	Program	Network	Rating
1	The Beverly Hillbillies	CBS	36.0
2	Candid Camera	CBS	31.1
2	The Red Skelton Show	CBS	31.1
4	Bonanza	NBC	29.8
4	The Lucy Show	CBS	29.8
6	The Andy Griffith Show	CBS	29.7
7	Ben Casey	ABC	28.7
7	The Danny Thomas Show	CBS	28.7
9	The Dick Van Dyke Show	CBS	27.1
10	Gunsmoke	CBS	27.0
11	Dr. Kildare	NBC	26.2
11	The Jack Benny Show	CBS	26.2
13	What's My Line?	CBS	25.5
14	The Ed Sullivan Show	CBS	25.3
15	Hazel	NBC	25.1
16	I've Got a Secret	CBS	24.9
17	The Jackie Gleason Show	CBS	24.1
18	The Defenders	CBS	23.9
19	The Garry Moore Show	CBS	23.3
19	To Tell the Truth	CBS	23.3
19	Lassie	CBS	23.3
22	Rawhide	CBS	22.8
23	Perry Mason	CBS	22.4
24	Walt Disney's Wonderful World of Color	NBC	22.3
25	Wagon Train	ABC	22.0
26	The Virginian	NBC	21.7
27	Route 66	CBS	21.3
28	My Three Sons	ABC	21.0
29	Have Gun – Will Travel	CBS	20.8
30	The Flintstones	ABC	20.5

October 1963–April 1964

Rank	Program	Network	Rating
1	The Beverly Hillbillies	CBS	39.1
2	Bonanza	NBC	36.9
3	The Dick Van Dyke Show	CBS	33.3
4	Petticoat Junction	CBS	30.3
5	The Andy Griffith Show	CBS	29.4
6	The Lucy Show	CBS	28.1
7	Candid Camera	CBS	27.7
8	The Ed Sullivan Show	CBS	27.5
9	The Danny Thomas Show	CBS	26.7
10	My Favorite Martian	CBS	26.3
11	The Red Skelton Show	CBS	25.7
12	I've Got a Secret	CBS	25.0
12	Lassie	CBS	25.0
12	The Jack Benny Show	CBS	25.0
15	The Jackie Gleason Show	CBS	24.6
16	The Donna Reed Show	ABC	24.5
17	The Virginian	NBC	24.0
18	The Patty Duke Show	ABC	23.9
19	Dr. Kildare	NBC	23.6
20	Gunsmoke	CBS	23.5
21	Walt Disney's Wonderful World of Color	NBC	23.0
22	Hazel	NBC	22.8
22	McHale's Navy	ABC	22.8
24	To Tell the Truth	CBS	22.6
24	What's My Line?	CBS	22.6
26	Perry Mason	CBS	22.1
27	My Three Sons	ABC	21.9
28	The Fugitive	ABC	21.7
29	The Adventures of Ozzie and Harriet	ABC	21.6
30	The Danny Kaye Show	CBS	21.5
30	Bob Hope Presents the Chrysler Theatre	NBC	21.5

October 1964–April 1965

Rank	Program	Network	Rating
1	Bonanza	NBC	36.3
2	Bewitched	ABC	31.0
3	Gomer Pyle, U.S.M.C.	CBS	30.7
4	The Andy Griffith Show	CBS	28.3
5	The Fugitive	ABC	27.9
6	The Red Skelton Hour	CBS	27.4
7	The Dick Van Dyke Show	CBS	27.1
8	The Lucy Show	CBS	26.6
9	Peyton Place II	ABC	26.4
10	Combat!	ABC	26.1
11	Walt Disney's Wonderful World of Color	NBC	25.7
12	The Beverly Hillbillies	CBS	25.6
13	My Three Sons	ABC	25.5
14	Branded	NBC	25.3
15	Petticoat Junction	CBS	25.2
15	The Ed Sullivan Show	CBS	25.2
17	Lassie	CBS	25.1
18	The Munsters	CBS	24.7
18	Gilligan's Island	CBS	24.7
20	Peyton Place I	ABC	24.6
21	The Jackie Gleason Show	CBS	24.4
22	The Virginian	NBC	24.0
23	The Addams Family	ABC	23.9
24	My Favorite Martian	CBS	23.7
25	Flipper	NBC	23.4
26	I've Got a Secret	CBS	23.0
27	Gunsmoke	CBS	22.6
28	The Patty Duke Show	ABC	22.4
29	McHale's Navy	ABC	22.3
30	The Lawrence Welk Show	ABC	22.0

October 1965–April 1966

Rank	Program	Network	Rating
1	Bonanza	NBC	31.8
2	Gomer Pyle, U.S.M.C.	CBS	27.8
3	The Lucy Show	CBS	27.7
4	The Red Skelton Hour	CBS	27.6
5	Batman (Thurs.)	ABC	27.0
6	The Andy Griffith Show	CBS	26.9
7	Bewitched	ABC	25.9
7	The Beverly Hillbillies	CBS	25.9
9	Hogan's Heroes	CBS	24.9
10	Batman (Wed.)	ABC	24.7
11	Green Acres	CBS	24.6
12	Get Smart	NBC	24.5
13	The Man from U.N.C.L.E.	NBC	24.0
14	Daktari	CBS	23.9
15	My Three Sons	CBS	23.8
16	The Dick Van Dyke Show	CBS	23.6
17	Walt Disney's Wonderful World of Color	NBC	23.2
17	The Ed Sullivan Show	CBS	23.2
19	The Lawrence Welk Show	ABC	22.4
19	I've Got a Secret	CBS	22.4
21	Petticoat Junction	CBS	22.3
22	Gilligan's Island	CBS	22.1
23	The Wild Wild West	CBS	22.0
23	The Jackie Gleason Show	CBS	22.0
23	The Virginian	NBC	22.0
26	Daniel Boone	NBC	21.9
27	Lassie	CBS	21.8
27	I Dream of Jeannie	NBC	21.8
29	Flipper	NBC	21.6
30	Gunsmoke	CBS	21.3

October 1966–April 1967

Rank	Program	Network	Rating
1	Bonanza	NBC	29.1
2	The Red Skelton Hour	CBS	28.2
3	The Andy Griffith Show	CBS	27.4
4	The Lucy Show	CBS	26.2
5	The Jackie Gleason Show	CBS	25.3
6	Green Acres	CBS	24.6
7	Daktari	CBS	23.4
7	Bewitched	ABC	23.4
7	The Beverly Hillbillies	CBS	23.4
10	Gomer Pyle, U.S.M.C.	CBS	22.8
10	The Virginian	NBC	22.8
10	The Lawrence Welk Show	ABC	22.8
10	The Ed Sullivan Show	CBS	22.8
14	The Dean Martin Show	NBC	22.6
14	Family Affair	CBS	22.6
16	The Smothers Brothers Comedy Hour	CBS	22.2
17	Friday Night Movies	CBS	21.8
17	Hogan's Heroes	CBS	21.8
19	Walt Disney's Wonderful World of Color	NBC	21.5
20	Saturday Night at the Movies	NBC	21.4
21	Dragnet	NBC	21.2
22	Get Smart	NBC	21.0
23	Petticoat Junction	CBS	20.9
23	The Rat Patrol	ABC	20.9
25	Daniel Boone	NBC	20.8
26	Bob Hope Presents the Chrysler Theatre	NBC	20.7
27	Tarzan	NBC	20.5
28	ABC Sunday Night Movie	ABC	20.4
29	I Spy	NBC	20.2
29	CBS Thursday Movie	CBS	20.2
29	My Three Sons	CBS	20.2
29	The F.B.I.	ABC	20.2

October 1967–April 1968

Rank	Program	Network	Rating
1	The Andy Griffith Show	CBS	27.6
2	The Lucy Show	CBS	27.0
3	Gomer Pyle, U.S.M.C.	CBS	25.6
4	Gunsmoke	CBS	25.5
4	Family Affair	CBS	25.5
4	Bonanza	NBC	25.5
7	The Red Skelton Show	CBS	25.3
8	The Dean Martin Show	NBC	24.8
9	The Jackie Gleason Show	CBS	23.9
10	Saturday Night at the Movies	NBC	23.6
11	Bewitched	ABC	23.5
12	The Beverly Hillbillies	CBS	23.3
13	The Ed Sullivan Show	CBS	23.2
14	The Virginian	NBC	22.9
15	Friday Night Movies	CBS	22.8
15	Green Acres	CBS	22.8
17	The Lawrence Welk Show	ABC	21.9
18	The Smothers Brothers Comedy Hour	CBS	21.7
19	Gentle Ben	CBS	21.5
20	Tuesday Night at the Movies	NBC	21.4
21	Rowan & Martin's Laugh-In	NBC	21.3
22	The F.B.I.	ABC	21.2
23	Thursday Night Movie	CBS	21.1
24	My Three Sons	CBS	20.8
25	Walt Disney's Wonderful World of Color	NBC	20.7
26	Ironside	NBC	20.5
27	The Carol Burnett Show	CBS	20.1
27	Dragnet	NBC	20.1
29	Daniel Boone	NBC	20.0
30	Lassie	CBS	19.9
30	It Takes a Thief	ABC	19.9

October 1968–April 1969

Rank	Program	Network	Rating
1	Rowan & Martin's Laugh-In	NBC	31.8
2	Gomer Pyle, U.S.M.C.	CBS	27.2
3	Bonanza	NBC	26.6
4	Mayberry R.F.D.	CBS	25.4
5	Family Affair	CBS	25.2
6	Gunsmoke	CBS	24.9
7	Julia	NBC	24.6
8	The Dean Martin Show	NBC	24.1
9	Here's Lucy	CBS	23.8
10	The Beverly Hillbillies	CBS	23.5
11	Mission: Impossible	CBS	23.3
11	Bewitched	ABC	23.3
11	The Red Skelton Hour	CBS	23.3
14	My Three Sons	CBS	22.8
15	The Glen Campbell Goodtime Hour	CBS	22.5
16	Ironside	NBC	22.3
17	The Virginian	NBC	21.8
18	The F.B.I.	ABC	21.7
19	Green Acres	CBS	21.6
20	Dragnet	NBC	21.4
21	Daniel Boone	NBC	21.3
21	Walt Disney's Wonderful World of Color	NBC	21.3
23	The Ed Sullivan Show	CBS	21.2
24	The Carol Burnett Show	CBS	20.8
24	The Jackie Gleason Show	CBS	20.8
26	I Dream of Jeannie	NBC	20.7
27	The Smothers Brothers Comedy Hour	CBS	20.6
28	The Mod Squad	ABC	20.5
28	The Lawrence Welk Show	ABC	20.5
30	The Doris Day Show	CBS	20.4

October 1969–April 1970

Rank	Program	Network	Rating
1	Rowan & Martin's Laugh-In	NBC	26.3
2	Gunsmoke	CBS	25.9
3	Bonanza	NBC	24.8
4	Mayberry R.F.D.	CBS	24.4
5	Family Affair	CBS	24.2
6	Here's Lucy	CBS	23.9
7	The Red Skelton Hour	CBS	23.8
8	Marcus Welby, M.D.	ABC	23.7
9	Walt Disney's Wonderful World of Color	NBC	23.6
10	The Doris Day Show	CBS	22.8
11	The Bill Cosby Show	NBC	22.7
12	The Jim Nabors Hour	CBS	22.4
13	The Carol Burnett Show	CBS	22.1
14	The Dean Martin Show	NBC	21.9
15	My Three Sons	CBS	21.8
15	Ironside	NBC	21.8
15	The Johnny Cash Show	ABC	21.8
18	The Beverly Hillbillies	CBS	21.7
19	Hawaii Five-O	CBS	21.1
20	The Glen Campbell Goodtime Hour	CBS	21.0
20	Hee Haw	CBS	21.0
22	Movie of the Week	ABC	20.9
23	The Mod Squad	ABC	20.8
24	Saturday Night Movie	NBC	20.6
24	Bewitched	ABC	20.6
24	The F.B.I.	ABC	20.6
27	The Ed Sullivan Show	CBS	20.3
28	Julia	NBC	20.1
29	CBS Thursday Movie	CBS	20.0
30	Mannix	CBS	19.9

== 1970s ==
October 1970–April 1971

Rank	Program	Network	Rating
1	Marcus Welby, M.D.	ABC	29.6
2	The Flip Wilson Show	NBC	27.9
3	Here's Lucy	CBS	26.1
4	Ironside	NBC	25.7
5	Gunsmoke	CBS	25.5
6	ABC Movie of the Week	ABC	25.1
7	Hawaii Five-O	CBS	25.0
8	Medical Center	CBS	24.5
9	Bonanza	NBC	23.9
10	The F.B.I.	ABC	23.0
11	The Mod Squad	ABC	22.7
12	Adam-12	NBC	22.6
13	Rowan & Martin's Laugh-In	NBC	22.4
13	The Wonderful World of Disney	NBC	22.4
15	Mayberry R.F.D.	CBS	22.3
16	Hee Haw	CBS	21.4
17	Mannix	CBS	21.3
18	The Men from Shiloh	NBC	21.2
19	My Three Sons	CBS	20.8
20	The Doris Day Show	CBS	20.7
21	The Smith Family	ABC	20.6
22	The Mary Tyler Moore Show	CBS	20.3
23	NBC Saturday Movie	NBC	20.1
24	The Dean Martin Show	NBC	20.0
25	The Carol Burnett Show	CBS	19.8
25	The Partridge Family	ABC	19.8
25	NBC Monday Movie	NBC	19.8
28	ABC Sunday Movie	ABC	19.7
29	The Jim Nabors Hour	CBS	19.5
30	CBS Thursday Movie	CBS	19.3

October 1971–April 1972

Rank	Program	Network	Rating
1	All in the Family	CBS	34.0
2	The Flip Wilson Show	NBC	28.2
3	Marcus Welby, M.D.	ABC	27.8
4	Gunsmoke	CBS	26.0
5	ABC Movie of the Week	ABC	25.6
6	Sanford and Son	NBC	25.2
7	Mannix	CBS	24.8
8	Funny Face	CBS	23.9
8	Adam-12	NBC	23.9
10	The Mary Tyler Moore Show	CBS	23.7
10	Here's Lucy	CBS	23.7
12	Hawaii Five-O	CBS	23.6
13	Medical Center	CBS	23.5
14	The NBC Mystery Movie	NBC	23.2
15	Ironside	NBC	23.0
16	The Partridge Family	ABC	22.6
17	The F.B.I.	ABC	22.4
18	The New Dick Van Dyke Show	CBS	22.2
19	The Wonderful World of Disney	NBC	22.0
20	Bonanza	NBC	21.9
21	The Mod Squad	ABC	21.5
22	Rowan & Martin's Laugh-In	NBC	21.4
23	The Carol Burnett Show	CBS	21.2
23	The Doris Day Show	CBS	21.2
25	Monday Night Football	ABC	20.9
26	ABC Sunday Movie	ABC	20.8
27	The Sonny & Cher Comedy Hour	CBS	20.2
28	Room 222	ABC	19.8
28	Cannon	CBS	19.8
30	CBS Friday Movie	CBS	19.5

October 1972–April 1973

Rank	Program	Network	Rating
1	All in the Family	CBS	33.3
2	Sanford and Son	NBC	27.6
3	Hawaii Five-O	CBS	25.2
4	Maude	CBS	24.7
5	Bridget Loves Bernie	CBS	24.2
5	The NBC Sunday Mystery Movie	NBC	24.2
7	The Mary Tyler Moore Show	CBS	23.6
7	Gunsmoke	CBS	23.6
9	The Wonderful World of Disney	NBC	23.5
10	Ironside	NBC	23.4
11	Adam-12	NBC	23.3
12	The Flip Wilson Show	NBC	23.1
13	Marcus Welby, M.D.	ABC	22.9
14	Cannon	CBS	22.4
15	Here's Lucy	CBS	21.9
16	The Bob Newhart Show	CBS	21.8
17	Tuesday Movie of the Week	ABC	21.5
18	Monday Night Football	ABC	21.0
19	The Partridge Family	ABC	20.6
19	The Waltons	CBS	20.6
19	Medical Center	CBS	20.6
22	The Carol Burnett Show	CBS	20.3
23	ABC Sunday Movie	ABC	20.0
23	The Rookies	ABC	20.0
25	Barnaby Jones	CBS	19.9
25	The Little People	NBC	19.9
25	ABC Wednesday Movie of the Week	ABC	19.9
28	NBC Monday Movie	NBC	19.3
29	ABC Monday Movie	ABC	19.2
29	The F.B.I.	ABC	19.2
29	Kung Fu	ABC	19.2

September 1973–April 1974

Rank	Program	Network	Rating
1	All in the Family	CBS	31.2
2	The Waltons	CBS	28.1
3	Sanford and Son	NBC	27.5
4	M*A*S*H	CBS	25.7
5	Hawaii Five-O	CBS	24.0
6	Maude	CBS	23.5
7	Kojak	CBS	23.3
7	The Sonny & Cher Comedy Hour	CBS	23.3
9	The Mary Tyler Moore Show	CBS	23.1
9	Cannon	CBS	23.1
11	The Six Million Dollar Man	ABC	22.7
12	The Bob Newhart Show	CBS	22.3
12	The Wonderful World of Disney	NBC	22.3
14	The NBC Sunday Mystery Movie	NBC	22.2
15	Gunsmoke	CBS	22.1
16	Happy Days	ABC	21.5
17	Good Times	CBS	21.4
17	Barnaby Jones	CBS	21.4
19	Monday Night Football	ABC	21.2
19	CBS Friday Night Movie	CBS	21.2
21	Tuesday Movie of the Week	ABC	21.0
22	The Streets of San Francisco	ABC	20.8
23	Adam-12	NBC	20.7
23	ABC Sunday Night Movie	ABC	20.7
25	The Rookies	ABC	20.3
26	ABC Monday Movie	ABC	20.2
27	The Carol Burnett Show	CBS	20.1
27	Kung Fu	ABC	20.1
29	Here's Lucy	CBS	20.0
30	CBS Thursday Movie	CBS	19.9

September 1974–April 1975

Rank	Program	Network	Rating
1	All in the Family	CBS	30.2
2	Sanford and Son	NBC	29.6
3	Chico and the Man	NBC	28.5
4	The Jeffersons	CBS	27.6
5	M*A*S*H	CBS	27.4
6	Rhoda	CBS	26.3
7	Good Times	CBS	25.8
8	The Waltons	CBS	25.5
9	Maude	CBS	24.9
10	Hawaii Five-O	CBS	24.8
11	The Mary Tyler Moore Show	CBS	24.0
12	The Rockford Files	NBC	23.7
13	Little House on the Prairie	NBC	23.5
14	Kojak	CBS	23.3
15	Police Woman	NBC	22.8
16	S.W.A.T.	ABC	22.6
17	The Bob Newhart Show	CBS	22.4
18	The Wonderful World of Disney	NBC	22.0
18	The Rookies	ABC	22.0
20	Mannix	CBS	21.6
20	Cannon	CBS	21.6
22	Cher	CBS	21.3
22	The Streets of San Francisco	ABC	21.3
22	The NBC Sunday Mystery Movie	NBC	21.3
25	Paul Sand in Friends and Lovers	CBS	20.7
25	Tony Orlando & Dawn	CBS	20.7
27	Medical Center	CBS	20.6
28	Gunsmoke	CBS	20.5
29	The Carol Burnett Show	CBS	20.4
30	Emergency!	NBC	20.0

September 1975–April 1976

Rank	Program	Network	Rating
1	All in the Family	CBS	30.1
2	Rich Man, Poor Man	ABC	28.0
3	Laverne & Shirley	ABC	27.5
4	Maude	CBS	25.0
5	The Bionic Woman	ABC	24.9
6	Phyllis	CBS	24.5
7	Sanford and Son	NBC	24.4
7	Rhoda	CBS	24.4
9	The Six Million Dollar Man	ABC	24.3
10	ABC Monday Night Movie	ABC	24.2
11	Happy Days	ABC	23.9
12	One Day at a Time	CBS	23.1
13	ABC Sunday Night Movie	ABC	23.0
14	The Waltons	CBS	22.9
14	M*A*S*H	CBS	22.9
16	Starsky & Hutch	ABC	22.5
16	Good Heavens	ABC	22.5
18	Welcome Back, Kotter	ABC	22.1
19	The Mary Tyler Moore Show	CBS	21.9
20	Kojak	CBS	21.8
21	The Jeffersons	CBS	21.5
22	Baretta	ABC	21.3
23	The Sonny & Cher Show	CBS	21.2
24	Good Times	CBS	21.0
25	Chico and the Man	NBC	20.8
26	The Bob Newhart Show	CBS	20.7
26	Donny & Marie	ABC	20.7
26	The Streets of San Francisco	ABC	20.7
29	The Carol Burnett Show	CBS	20.5
30	Police Woman	NBC	20.2

September 1976–April 1977

Rank	Program	Network	Rating
1	Happy Days	ABC	31.5
2	Laverne & Shirley	ABC	30.9
3	ABC Monday Night Movie	ABC	26.0
4	M*A*S*H	CBS	25.9
5	Charlie's Angels	ABC	25.8
6	The Big Event	NBC	24.4
7	The Six Million Dollar Man	ABC	24.2
8	ABC Sunday Night Movie	ABC	23.4
8	Baretta	ABC	23.4
8	One Day at a Time	CBS	23.4
11	Three's Company	ABC	23.1
12	All in the Family	CBS	22.9
13	Welcome Back, Kotter	ABC	22.7
14	The Bionic Woman	ABC	22.4
15	The Waltons	CBS	22.3
15	Little House on the Prairie	NBC	22.3
17	Barney Miller	ABC	22.2
18	60 Minutes	CBS	21.9
18	Hawaii Five-O	CBS	21.9
20	NBC Monday Night Movie	NBC	21.8
21	Rich Man, Poor Man Book II	ABC	21.6
22	Monday Night Football	ABC	21.2
23	Eight Is Enough	ABC	21.1
24	The Jeffersons	CBS	21.0
25	What's Happening!!	ABC	20.9
26	Good Times	CBS	20.5
27	Sanford and Son	NBC	20.3
28	ABC Friday Night Movie	ABC	20.2
29	The Tony Randall Show	ABC	20.1
30	Alice	CBS	20.0

September 1977–April 1978

Rank	Program	Network	Rating
1	Laverne & Shirley	ABC	31.6
2	Happy Days	ABC	31.4
3	Three's Company	ABC	28.3
4	60 Minutes	CBS	24.4
4	Charlie's Angels	ABC	24.4
4	All in the Family	CBS	24.4
7	Little House on the Prairie	NBC	24.1
8	Alice	CBS	23.2
8	M*A*S*H	CBS	23.2
10	One Day at a Time	CBS	23.0
11	How the West Was Won	ABC	22.5
12	Eight Is Enough	ABC	22.2
13	Soap	ABC	22.0
14	The Love Boat	ABC	21.9
15	NBC Monday Night Movie	NBC	21.7
16	Monday Night Football	ABC	21.5
17	Fantasy Island	ABC	21.4
17	Barney Miller	ABC	21.4
19	Project U.F.O.	NBC	21.2
20	ABC Sunday Night Movie	ABC	20.8
20	The Waltons	CBS	20.8
22	Barnaby Jones	CBS	20.6
23	Hawaii Five-O	CBS	20.4
24	ABC Monday Night Movie	ABC	20.3
25	Rhoda	CBS	20.1
26	The Incredible Hulk	CBS	19.9
26	Family	ABC	19.9
26	Welcome Back, Kotter	ABC	19.9
29	On Our Own	CBS	19.6
30	The Big Event — Sunday	NBC	19.4

September 1978–April 1979

Rank	Program	Network	Rating
1	Laverne & Shirley	ABC	30.5
2	Three's Company	ABC	30.3
3	Mork & Mindy	ABC	28.6
3	Happy Days	ABC	28.6
5	Angie	ABC	26.7
6	60 Minutes	CBS	25.5
7	M*A*S*H	CBS	25.4
8	The Ropers	ABC	25.2
9	All in the Family	CBS	24.9
9	Taxi	ABC	24.9
11	Eight Is Enough	ABC	24.8
12	Charlie's Angels	ABC	24.4
13	Alice	CBS	23.2
14	Little House on the Prairie	NBC	23.1
15	ABC Sunday Night Movie	ABC	22.6
15	Barney Miller	ABC	22.6
17	The Love Boat	ABC	22.1
18	One Day at a Time	CBS	21.6
19	Soap	ABC	21.3
20	The Dukes of Hazzard	CBS	21.0
21	NBC Monday Night Movie	NBC	20.9
22	Fantasy Island	ABC	20.8
23	Vega$	ABC	20.6
24	Barnaby Jones	CBS	20.5
25	CHiPs	NBC	20.3
26	Stockard Channing in Just Friends	CBS	20.2
27	Diff'rent Strokes	NBC	19.9
28	Monday Night Football	ABC	19.8
28	What's Happening!!	ABC	19.8
30	Lou Grant	CBS	19.7

September 1979–April 1980

Rank	Program	Network	Rating
1	60 Minutes	CBS	28.4
2	Three's Company	ABC	26.3
3	That's Incredible!	ABC	25.8
4	Alice	CBS	25.3
4	M*A*S*H	CBS	25.3
6	Dallas	CBS	25.0
7	Flo	CBS	24.4
8	The Jeffersons	CBS	24.3
9	The Dukes of Hazzard	CBS	24.1
10	One Day at a Time	CBS	23.0
11	Archie Bunker's Place	CBS	22.9
12	Eight Is Enough	ABC	22.8
13	Taxi	ABC	22.4
14	House Calls	CBS	22.1
14	Real People	NBC	22.1
16	Little House on the Prairie	NBC	21.8
17	Happy Days	ABC	21.7
18	CHiPs	NBC	21.5
19	Trapper John, M.D.	CBS	21.2
20	Charlie's Angels	ABC	20.9
20	Barney Miller	ABC	20.9
22	WKRP in Cincinnati	CBS	20.7
23	Benson	ABC	20.6
23	The Love Boat	ABC	20.6
25	Soap	ABC	20.5
26	Diff'rent Strokes	NBC	20.3
27	Mork & Mindy	ABC	20.2
28	Fantasy Island	ABC	20.1
29	Tenspeed and Brown Shoe	ABC	20.0
29	ABC Sunday Night Movie	ABC	20.0
29	Vega$	ABC	20.0
29	Knots Landing	CBS	20.0

== 1980s ==
September 1980–April 1981

Rank	Program	Network	Rating
1	Dallas	CBS	34.5
2	The Dukes of Hazzard	CBS	27.3
3	60 Minutes	CBS	27.0
4	M*A*S*H	CBS	25.7
5	The Love Boat	ABC	24.3
6	The Jeffersons	CBS	23.5
7	Alice	CBS	22.9
8	House Calls	CBS	22.4
8	Three's Company	ABC	22.4
10	Little House on the Prairie	NBC	22.1
11	One Day at a Time	CBS	22.0
12	Real People	NBC	21.5
13	Archie Bunker's Place	CBS	21.4
14	Magnum, P.I.	CBS	21.0
15	Happy Days	ABC	20.8
15	Too Close for Comfort	ABC	20.8
17	Fantasy Island	ABC	20.7
17	Trapper John, M.D.	CBS	20.7
17	Diff'rent Strokes	NBC	20.7
20	Monday Night Football	ABC	20.6
20	Laverne & Shirley	ABC	20.6
22	That's Incredible!	ABC	20.5
23	Hart to Hart	ABC	19.9
24	ABC Sunday Night Movie	ABC	19.4
24	CHiPs	NBC	19.4
26	The Facts of Life	NBC	19.3
27	Lou Grant	CBS	19.1
28	Knots Landing	CBS	19.0
29	NBC Monday Night Movie	NBC	18.8
30	The Waltons	CBS	18.6

September 1981–April 1982

Rank	Program	Network	Rating
1	Dallas	CBS	28.4
2	60 Minutes	CBS	27.7
3	The Jeffersons	CBS	23.4
4	Three's Company	ABC	23.3
5	Alice	CBS	22.7
6	The Dukes of Hazzard	CBS	22.6
6	Too Close for Comfort	ABC	22.6
8	ABC Monday Night Movie	ABC	22.5
9	M*A*S*H	CBS	22.3
10	One Day at a Time	CBS	22.0
11	Monday Night Football	ABC	21.8
12	Archie Bunker's Place	CBS	21.6
13	Falcon Crest	CBS	21.4
14	The Love Boat	ABC	21.2
15	Hart to Hart	ABC	21.1
15	Trapper John, M.D.	CBS	21.1
17	Magnum, P.I.	CBS	20.9
18	Happy Days	ABC	20.6
19	Dynasty	ABC	20.2
20	Laverne & Shirley	ABC	19.9
21	Real People	NBC	19.7
22	ABC Sunday Night Movie	ABC	19.5
23	House Calls	CBS	19.2
24	The Facts of Life	NBC	19.1
24	Little House on the Prairie	NBC	19.1
26	The Fall Guy	ABC	19.0
27	Hill Street Blues	NBC	18.6
28	That's Incredible!	ABC	18.4
28	T.J. Hooker	ABC	18.4
30	Fantasy Island	ABC	18.3

September 1982–April 1983

Rank	Program	Network	Rating
1	60 Minutes	CBS	25.5
2	Dallas	CBS	24.6
3	M*A*S*H	CBS	22.6
3	Magnum, P.I.	CBS	22.6
5	Dynasty	ABC	22.4
6	Three's Company	ABC	21.2
7	Simon & Simon	CBS	21.0
8	Falcon Crest	CBS	20.7
9	The Love Boat	ABC	20.3
10	The A-Team	NBC	20.1
10	Monday Night Football	ABC	20.1
12	The Jeffersons	CBS	20.0
12	Newhart	CBS	20.0
14	The Fall Guy	ABC	19.4
15	9 to 5	ABC	19.3
16	One Day at a Time	CBS	19.1
17	Hart to Hart	ABC	18.9
18	Gloria	CBS	18.7
18	Trapper John, M.D.	CBS	18.7
20	Knots Landing	CBS	18.6
21	Hill Street Blues	NBC	18.4
22	That's Incredible!	ABC	18.3
22	Archie Bunker's Place	CBS	18.3
24	ABC Monday Night Movie	ABC	18.0
25	Laverne & Shirley	ABC	17.8
26	ABC Sunday Night Movie	ABC	17.6
27	CBS Tuesday Night Movie	CBS	17.5
28	Happy Days	ABC	17.4
28	Little House: A New Beginning	NBC	17.4
30	Real People	NBC	17.2
30	The Dukes of Hazzard	CBS	17.2

September 1983–April 1984

Rank	Program	Network	Rating
1	Dallas	CBS	25.7
2	60 Minutes	CBS	24.2
3	Dynasty	ABC	24.1
4	The A-Team	NBC	24.0
5	Simon & Simon	CBS	23.8
6	Magnum, P.I.	CBS	22.4
7	Falcon Crest	CBS	22.0
8	Kate & Allie	CBS	21.9
9	Hotel	ABC	21.1
10	Cagney & Lacey	CBS	20.9
11	Knots Landing	CBS	20.8
12	ABC Sunday Night Movie	ABC	20.4
12	ABC Monday Night Movie	ABC	20.4
14	TV's Bloopers & Practical Jokes	NBC	20.3
15	AfterMASH	CBS	20.1
16	The Fall Guy	ABC	19.9
17	The Love Boat	ABC	19.0
18	Riptide	NBC	18.8
19	The Jeffersons	CBS	18.6
20	Scarecrow & Mrs. King	CBS	18.3
21	Monday Night Football	ABC	18.1
21	NBC Monday Night Movie	NBC	18.1
23	Newhart	CBS	18.0
24	The Facts of Life	NBC	17.3
25	CBS Tuesday Night Movie	CBS	17.2
25	Webster	ABC	17.2
25	Alice	CBS	17.2
25	Knight Rider	NBC	17.2
25	Hardcastle and McCormick	ABC	17.2
30	Trapper John, M.D.	CBS	17.0

September 1984–April 1985

Rank	Program	Network	Rating
1	Dynasty	ABC	25.0
2	Dallas	CBS	24.7
3	The Cosby Show	NBC	24.2
4	60 Minutes	CBS	22.2
5	Family Ties	NBC	22.1
6	The A-Team	NBC	21.9
7	Simon & Simon	CBS	21.8
8	Murder, She Wrote	CBS	20.1
9	Knots Landing	CBS	20.0
10	Falcon Crest	CBS	19.9
10	Crazy Like a Fox	CBS	19.9
12	Hotel	ABC	19.7
12	Cheers	NBC	19.7
14	Riptide	NBC	19.2
15	Magnum, P.I.	CBS	19.1
16	Newhart	CBS	18.4
17	Kate & Allie	CBS	18.3
18	NBC Monday Night Movie	NBC	18.2
19	Highway to Heaven	NBC	17.7
20	Night Court	NBC	17.6
21	ABC Sunday Night Movie	ABC	17.5
22	Scarecrow & Mrs. King	CBS	17.1
22	TV's Bloopers & Practical Jokes	NBC	17.1
22	The Fall Guy	ABC	17.1
25	Monday Night Football	ABC	17.0
25	Remington Steele	NBC	17.0
25	Webster	ABC	17.0
28	Cagney & Lacey	CBS	16.9
29	Trapper John, M.D.	CBS	16.8
30	Hill Street Blues	NBC	16.6

September 1985–April 1986

Rank	Program	Network	Rating
1	The Cosby Show	NBC	33.7
2	Family Ties	NBC	30.0
3	Murder, She Wrote	CBS	25.3
4	60 Minutes	CBS	23.9
5	Cheers	NBC	23.7
6	Dallas	CBS	21.9
7	Dynasty	ABC	21.8
7	The Golden Girls	NBC	21.8
9	Miami Vice	NBC	21.3
10	Who's the Boss?	ABC	21.1
11	Night Court	NBC	20.9
12	CBS Sunday Night Movie	CBS	20.5
13	Highway to Heaven	NBC	20.1
14	Kate & Allie	CBS	20.0
15	Monday Night Football	ABC	19.8
16	Newhart	CBS	19.6
17	Knots Landing	CBS	19.5
17	Growing Pains	ABC	19.5
19	You Again?	NBC	19.2
20	227	NBC	18.8
21	NBC Sunday Night Movie	NBC	18.5
22	Hotel	ABC	18.3
22	NBC Monday Night Movie	NBC	18.3
24	Moonlighting	ABC	18.1
24	Falcon Crest	CBS	18.1
24	Valerie	NBC	18.1
27	The Facts of Life	NBC	17.7
28	Scarecrow & Mrs. King	CBS	17.4
29	Simon & Simon	CBS	17.2
30	The A-Team	NBC	16.9

September 1986–April 1987

Rank	Program	Network	Rating
1	The Cosby Show	NBC	34.9
2	Family Ties	NBC	32.7
3	Cheers	NBC	27.2
4	Murder, She Wrote	CBS	25.4
5	The Golden Girls	NBC	24.5
6	60 Minutes	CBS	23.3
7	Night Court	NBC	23.2
8	Growing Pains	ABC	22.7
9	Moonlighting	ABC	22.4
10	Who's the Boss?	ABC	22.0
11	Dallas	CBS	21.3
12	Newhart	CBS	19.5
13	Amen	NBC	19.4
14	227	NBC	18.9
15	Matlock	NBC	18.6
15	CBS Sunday Night Movie	CBS	18.6
15	NBC Monday Night Movie	NBC	18.6
18	Monday Night Football	ABC	18.4
19	Kate & Allie	CBS	18.3
20	NBC Sunday Night Movie	NBC	18.2
21	L.A. Law	NBC	17.4
21	My Sister Sam	CBS	17.4
23	Falcon Crest	CBS	17.3
24	Highway to Heaven	NBC	17.2
24	Dynasty	ABC	17.2
26	Knots Landing	CBS	16.8
26	Miami Vice	NBC	16.8
28	ALF	NBC	16.5
28	Hunter	NBC	16.5
30	Head of the Class	ABC	16.4

September 1987–April 1988

Rank	Program	Network	Rating
1	The Cosby Show	NBC	27.8
2	A Different World	NBC	25.0
3	Cheers	NBC	23.4
4	The Golden Girls	NBC	21.8
5	Growing Pains	ABC	21.3
6	Who's the Boss?	ABC	21.2
7	Night Court	NBC	20.8
8	60 Minutes	CBS	20.6
9	Murder, She Wrote	CBS	20.2
10	ALF	NBC	18.8
10	The Wonder Years	ABC	18.8
12	Moonlighting	ABC	18.3
12	L.A. Law	NBC	18.3
14	Matlock	NBC	17.8
15	Amen	NBC	17.5
16	Monday Night Football	ABC	17.4
17	Family Ties	NBC	17.3
18	CBS Sunday Night Movie	CBS	17.2
19	In the Heat of the Night	NBC	17.0
20	My Two Dads	NBC	16.9
20	Valerie's Family	NBC	16.9
22	Dallas	CBS	16.8
23	NBC Sunday Night Movie	NBC	16.7
23	Head of the Class	ABC	16.7
25	Newhart	CBS	16.5
26	NBC Monday Night Movie	NBC	16.4
27	227	NBC	16.3
28	Day by Day	NBC	16.2
29	Hunter	NBC	16.1
30	Aaron's Way	NBC	16.0

October 1988–April 1989

Rank	Program	Network	Rating
1	The Cosby Show	NBC	25.6
2	Roseanne	ABC	23.8
3	A Different World	NBC	23.0
4	Cheers	NBC	22.3
5	60 Minutes	CBS	21.7
6	The Golden Girls	NBC	21.4
7	Who's the Boss?	ABC	20.8
8	Murder, She Wrote	CBS	19.9
9	Empty Nest	NBC	19.2
10	Anything but Love	ABC	19.0
11	Dear John	NBC	18.5
12	Matlock	NBC	17.7
13	L.A. Law	NBC	17.6
13	Growing Pains	ABC	17.6
15	ALF	NBC	17.5
15	Monday Night Football	ABC	17.5
17	Unsolved Mysteries	NBC	17.4
18	In the Heat of the Night	NBC	17.3
19	Hunter	NBC	17.2
20	Head of the Class	ABC	17.1
21	Night Court	NBC	16.9
22	The Hogan Family	NBC	16.3
22	NBC Sunday Night Movie	NBC	16.3
22	The Wonder Years	ABC	16.3
25	Amen	NBC	16.2
25	NBC Monday Night Movie	NBC	16.2
27	Knots Landing	CBS	16.1
27	CBS Sunday Movie	CBS	16.1
29	ABC Mystery Movie	ABC	15.4
29	Dallas	CBS	15.4

September 1989–April 1990

Rank	Program	Network	Rating
1	The Cosby Show	NBC	23.1
1	Roseanne	ABC	23.1
3	Cheers	NBC	22.7
4	A Different World	NBC	21.1
5	America's Funniest Home Videos	ABC	20.9
6	The Golden Girls	NBC	20.1
7	60 Minutes	CBS	19.7
8	The Wonder Years	ABC	19.2
9	Empty Nest	NBC	18.9
10	Monday Night Football	ABC	18.1
11	Unsolved Mysteries	NBC	18.0
12	Who's the Boss?	ABC	17.9
13	Murder, She Wrote	CBS	17.7
13	Chicken Soup	ABC	17.7
15	Grand	NBC	17.6
16	L.A. Law	NBC	17.4
17	Dear John	NBC	17.2
18	Coach	ABC	17.0
19	In the Heat of the Night	NBC	16.9
20	Matlock	NBC	16.6
21	Growing Pains	ABC	15.4
22	Full House	ABC	15.3
22	Designing Women	CBS	15.3
24	CBS Sunday Movie	CBS	14.9
24	Hunter	NBC	14.9
26	Head of the Class	ABC	14.8
27	Murphy Brown	CBS	14.7
28	The Simpsons	FOX	14.5
28	Night Court	NBC	14.5
28	Doogie Howser, M.D.	ABC	14.5

== 1990s ==
September 1990–April 1991

Rank	Program	Network	Rating
1	Cheers	NBC	21.3
2	60 Minutes	CBS	20.6
3	Roseanne	ABC	18.1
4	A Different World	NBC	17.5
5	The Cosby Show	NBC	17.1
6	Murphy Brown	CBS	16.9
7	Empty Nest	NBC	16.7
7	America's Funniest Home Videos	ABC	16.7
9	Monday Night Football	ABC	16.6
10	The Golden Girls	NBC	16.5
10	Designing Women	CBS	16.5
12	Murder, She Wrote	CBS	16.4
13	America's Funniest People	ABC	16.3
14	Full House	ABC	15.9
15	Family Matters	ABC	15.8
16	Unsolved Mysteries	NBC	15.7
17	Matlock	NBC	15.5
18	Coach	ABC	15.3
19	Who's the Boss?	ABC	15.0
19	CBS Sunday Movie	CBS	15.0
21	In the Heat of the Night	NBC	14.9
21	Major Dad	CBS	14.9
23	L.A. Law	NBC	14.8
24	Doogie Howser, M.D.	ABC	14.7
25	Grand	NBC	14.6
26	Head of the Class	ABC	14.5
27	Growing Pains	ABC	14.3
27	Baby Talk	ABC	14.3
27	Davis Rules	ABC	14.3
30	The Wonder Years	ABC	14.2

September 1991–April 1992

Rank	Program	Network	Rating
1	60 Minutes	CBS	21.9
2	Roseanne	ABC	19.9
3	Murphy Brown	CBS	18.6
4	Cheers	NBC	17.5
4	Home Improvement	ABC	17.5
6	Designing Women	CBS	17.3
7	Full House	ABC	17.0
8	Murder, She Wrote	CBS	16.9
9	Major Dad	CBS	16.8
10	Coach	ABC	16.7
10	Room for Two	ABC	16.7
12	Monday Night Football	ABC	16.6
13	Unsolved Mysteries	NBC	16.5
14	CBS Sunday Night Movie	CBS	15.9
15	Evening Shade	CBS	15.6
16	Northern Exposure	CBS	15.5
17	A Different World	NBC	15.2
18	The Cosby Show	NBC	15.0
19	Wings	NBC	14.6
20	America's Funniest Home Videos	ABC	14.5
21	20/20	ABC	14.4
22	The Fresh Prince of Bel-Air	NBC	14.3
22	Empty Nest	NBC	14.3
24	NBC Monday Movie	NBC	13.9
25	America's Funniest People	ABC	13.8
25	ABC Monday Movie	ABC	13.8
27	Family Matters	ABC	13.5
28	L.A. Law	NBC	13.3
29	48 Hours	CBS	13.2
30	In the Heat of the Night	NBC	13.1
30	The Golden Girls	NBC	13.1

September 1992–April 1993

Rank	Program	Network	Rating
1	60 Minutes	CBS	21.9
2	Roseanne	ABC	20.7
3	Home Improvement	ABC	19.4
4	Murphy Brown	CBS	17.9
5	Murder She Wrote	CBS	17.7
6	Coach	ABC	17.5
7	Monday Night Football	ABC	16.7
8	CBS Sunday Movie	CBS	16.1
8	Cheers	NBC	16.1
10	Full House	ABC	15.8
11	Northern Exposure	CBS	15.2
12	20/20	ABC	15.1
12	Rescue 911	CBS	15.1
14	CBS Tuesday Movie	CBS	14.8
15	Love & War	CBS	14.7
16	The Fresh Prince of Bel-Air	NBC	14.6
16	Hangin' with Mr. Cooper	ABC	14.6
16	The Jackie Thomas Show	ABC	14.6
19	Evening Shade	CBS	14.5
20	Hearts Afire	CBS	14.3
21	Unsolved Mysteries	NBC	14.2
22	Primetime Live	ABC	14.1
23	Dr. Quinn, Medicine Woman	CBS	14.0
24	NBC Monday Movie	NBC	13.9
25	Seinfeld	NBC	13.7
26	48 Hours	CBS	13.5
26	Blossom	NBC	13.5
28	ABC Sunday Night Movie	ABC	13.3
28	Matlock	ABC	13.3
30	Wings	NBC	13.0
30	The Simpsons	FOX	13.0

September 1993–April 1994

Rank	Program	Network	Rating
1	60 Minutes	CBS	20.9
2	Home Improvement	ABC	20.4
3	Seinfeld	NBC	19.4
4	Roseanne	ABC	19.1
5	Grace Under Fire	ABC	17.7
6	Coach	ABC	17.4
7	Frasier	NBC	16.8
8	Monday Night Football	ABC	16.5
9	Murphy Brown	CBS	16.3
10	CBS Sunday Movie	CBS	16.2
11	Murder, She Wrote	CBS	16.0
12	Thunder Alley	ABC	15.9
13	Love & War	CBS	14.5
14	Northern Exposure	CBS	14.4
15	20/20	ABC	14.3
16	Full House	ABC	14.2
17	Primetime Live	ABC	14.0
18	NYPD Blue	ABC	13.9
18	Wings	NBC	13.9
20	Turning Point	ABC	13.8
21	Dave's World	CBS	13.7
21	The Fresh Prince of Bel-Air	NBC	13.7
23	NBC Monday Movie	NBC	13.6
24	Homicide: Life on the Street	NBC	13.5
25	CBS Tuesday Movie	CBS	13.3
25	Dr. Quinn, Medicine Woman	CBS	13.3
27	Phenom	ABC	13.2
27	Evening Shade	CBS	13.2
27	Rescue 911	CBS	13.2
30	ABC Sunday Night Movie	ABC	12.6
30	Family Matters	ABC	12.6

September 1994–April 1995

Rank	Program	Network	Rating
1	Seinfeld	NBC	20.6
2	ER	NBC	20.0
3	Home Improvement	ABC	19.5
4	Grace Under Fire	ABC	18.6
5	Monday Night Football	ABC	17.7
6	60 Minutes	CBS	17.2
7	NYPD Blue	ABC	16.5
8	Murder, She Wrote	CBS	15.6
8	Friends	NBC	15.6
10	Roseanne	ABC	15.5
11	Mad About You	NBC	15.2
12	Madman of the People	NBC	14.9
13	Ellen	ABC	14.8
14	Hope and Gloria	NBC	14.6
15	Frasier	NBC	14.5
16	Murphy Brown	CBS	14.1
17	20/20	ABC	14.0
18	CBS Sunday Movie	CBS	13.7
19	NBC Monday Movie	NBC	13.6
20	Me and the Boys	ABC	13.1
21	Dave's World	CBS	12.9
22	Cybill	CBS	12.8
23	ABC Sunday Movie	ABC	12.7
24	The Nanny	CBS	12.5
25	Full House	ABC	12.4
26	Wings	NBC	12.3
27	Law & Order	NBC	12.2
28	NBC Sunday Night Movie	NBC	12.0
29	Chicago Hope	CBS	11.7
29	ABC Monday Night Movie	ABC	11.7
29	The Martin Short Show	NBC	11.7
29	Primetime Live	ABC	11.7

September 1995–May 1996

Rank	Program	Network	Rating
1	ER	NBC	22.0
2	Seinfeld	NBC	21.2
3	Friends	NBC	18.7
4	Caroline in the City	NBC	18.0
5	Monday Night Football	ABC	17.1
6	The Single Guy	NBC	16.7
7	Home Improvement	ABC	16.1
8	Boston Common	NBC	15.6
9	60 Minutes	CBS	14.2
10	NYPD Blue	ABC	14.1
11	20/20	ABC	13.6
11	Frasier	NBC	13.6
13	Grace Under Fire	ABC	13.2
14	NBC Monday Movie	NBC	12.9
14	Coach	ABC	12.9
16	The Nanny	CBS	12.5
16	Roseanne	ABC	12.5
18	Walker, Texas Ranger	CBS	12.3
18	Primetime Live	ABC	12.3
18	Murphy Brown	CBS	12.3
21	NBC Sunday Movie	NBC	12.2
22	3rd Rock from the Sun	NBC	12.1
23	Chicago Hope	CBS	11.9
24	Law & Order	NBC	11.4
24	CBS Sunday Movie	CBS	11.4
24	The Naked Truth	ABC	11.4
24	Can't Hurry Love	CBS	11.4
28	Dateline NBC — Tuesday	NBC	11.3
28	Dateline NBC — Wednesday	NBC	11.3
30	The Dana Carvey Show	ABC	11.2

September 1996–May 1997

Rank	Program	Network	Rating
1	ER	NBC	21.2
2	Seinfeld	NBC	20.5
3	Suddenly Susan	NBC	17.0
4	Friends	NBC	16.8
4	The Naked Truth	NBC	16.8
6	Fired Up	NBC	16.5
7	Monday Night Football	ABC	16.0
8	The Single Guy	NBC	14.1
9	Home Improvement	ABC	14.0
10	Touched by an Angel	CBS	13.6
11	60 Minutes	CBS	13.3
12	20/20	ABC	12.8
13	NYPD Blue	ABC	12.5
14	CBS Sunday Movie	CBS	12.1
15	Primetime Live	ABC	11.9
16	Frasier	NBC	11.8
17	Spin City	ABC	11.7
18	NBC Sunday Movie	NBC	11.5
18	The Drew Carey Show	ABC	11.5
20	Dateline NBC — Tuesday	NBC	11.4
21	Cosby	CBS	11.2
21	The X-Files	FOX	11.2
23	Walker, Texas Ranger	CBS	11.0
23	Mad About You	NBC	11.0
23	Caroline in the City	NBC	11.0
23	NBC Monday Movie	NBC	11.0
27	Law & Order	NBC	10.8
27	3rd Rock from the Sun	NBC	10.8
29	Ellen	ABC	10.6
30	Chicago Hope	CBS	10.5
30	Dateline NBC — Friday	NBC	10.5
30	Cybill	CBS	10.5

September 1997–May 1998

Rank	Program	Network	Rating
1	Seinfeld	NBC	21.7
2	ER	NBC	20.4
3	Veronica's Closet	NBC	16.6
4	Friends	NBC	16.1
5	Monday Night Football	ABC	15.0
6	Touched by an Angel	CBS	14.2
7	60 Minutes	CBS	13.8
8	Union Square	NBC	13.6
9	CBS Sunday Movie	CBS	13.1
10	Home Improvement	ABC	12.0
10	Frasier	NBC	12.0
12	Just Shoot Me!	NBC	11.9
13	Dateline NBC — Tuesday	NBC	11.5
14	Dateline NBC — Monday	NBC	11.4
15	The Drew Carey Show	ABC	11.1
16	20/20 — Friday	ABC	10.9
17	Primetime Live	ABC	10.8
17	NYPD Blue	ABC	10.8
19	The X-Files	FOX	10.6
20	Law & Order	NBC	10.2
21	20/20 — Monday	ABC	10.0
22	Diagnosis: Murder	CBS	9.8
23	Mad About You	NBC	9.7
23	King of the Hill	FOX	9.7
25	Cosby	CBS	9.5
25	Dharma & Greg	ABC	9.5
27	NBC Sunday Night Movie	NBC	9.4
28	Walker, Texas Ranger	CBS	9.3
28	Hiller and Diller	ABC	9.3
30	The Simpsons	FOX	9.2
30	Everybody Loves Raymond	CBS	9.2

September 1998–May 1999

Rank	Program	Network	Rating
1	ER	NBC	17.8
2	Friends	NBC	15.7
3	Frasier	NBC	15.6
4	Monday Night Football	ABC	14.9
5	Veronica's Closet	NBC	13.7
5	Jesse	NBC	13.7
7	60 Minutes	CBS	13.2
8	Touched by an Angel	CBS	13.1
9	CBS Sunday Movie	CBS	12.0
10	Home Improvement	ABC	11.0
11	Everybody Loves Raymond	CBS	10.6
12	NYPD Blue	ABC	10.5
13	Law & Order	NBC	10.1
14	The Drew Carey Show	ABC	9.9
14	20/20 — Friday	ABC	9.9
16	Providence	NBC	9.8
16	20/20 — Wednesday	ABC	9.8
16	JAG	CBS	9.8
19	Dateline NBC — Tuesday	NBC	9.7
19	Dateline NBC — Monday	NBC	9.7
19	Becker	CBS	9.7
19	CBS Tuesday Movie	CBS	9.7
23	Ally McBeal	FOX	9.6
24	Dharma & Greg	ABC	9.3
25	Spin City	ABC	9.2
25	Walker, Texas Ranger	CBS	9.2
25	Dateline NBC — Friday	NBC	9.2
28	The X-Files	FOX	9.1
28	NBC Sunday Night Movie	NBC	9.1
30	60 Minutes II	CBS	9.0
30	Diagnosis: Murder	CBS	9.0

September 1999–May 2000

Rank	Program	Network	Rating
1	Who Wants to Be a Millionaire — Tuesday	ABC	18.6
2	Who Wants to Be a Millionaire — Thursday	ABC	17.5
3	Who Wants to Be a Millionaire — Sunday	ABC	17.1
4	ER	NBC	16.9
5	Friends	NBC	14.0
6	Frasier	NBC	13.6
7	Monday Night Football	ABC	13.5
8	60 Minutes	CBS	12.0
9	The Practice	ABC	11.8
10	Touched by an Angel	CBS	11.6
11	Law & Order	NBC	11.5
12	Everybody Loves Raymond	CBS	11.4
13	Jesse	NBC	11.3
14	CBS Sunday Movie	CBS	10.9
15	Stark Raving Mad	NBC	10.7
15	NYPD Blue	ABC	10.7
17	Dharma & Greg	ABC	10.5
18	Becker	CBS	10.4
19	Judging Amy	CBS	10.2
20	JAG	CBS	9.7
21	The Drew Carey Show	ABC	9.5
22	Providence	NBC	9.4
23	60 Minutes II	CBS	9.3
24	The West Wing	NBC	9.1
24	ABC Monday Movie	ABC	9.1
24	Spin City	ABC	9.1
27	Family Law	CBS	9.0
28	Dateline NBC — Friday	NBC	8.9
28	Malcolm in the Middle	FOX	8.9
30	Law & Order: Special Victims Unit	NBC	8.8
30	CBS Wednesday Movie	CBS	8.8

== 2000s ==
September 2000–May 2001

Rank	Program	Network	Rating
1	Survivor	CBS	17.4
2	ER	NBC	15.0
3	Who Wants to Be a Millionaire — Wednesday	ABC	13.7
4	Who Wants to Be a Millionaire — Tuesday	ABC	13.0
5	Friends	NBC	12.6
5	Monday Night Football	ABC	12.6
5	Everybody Loves Raymond	CBS	12.6
8	Who Wants to Be a Millionaire — Sunday	ABC	12.4
9	Law & Order	NBC	12.3
10	The Practice	ABC	11.7
11	Who Wants to Be a Millionaire — Thursday	ABC	11.6
11	CSI: Crime Scene Investigation	CBS	11.6
11	The West Wing	NBC	11.6
14	Will & Grace	NBC	11.3
15	60 Minutes	CBS	11.1
16	Becker	CBS	10.9
17	Temptation Island	FOX	10.7
17	Frasier	NBC	10.7
19	Who Wants to Be a Millionaire — Friday	ABC	10.5
20	Just Shoot Me!	NBC	10.4
21	Judging Amy	CBS	9.9
22	Cursed/The Weber Show	NBC	9.7
22	NYPD Blue	ABC	9.7
22	Touched by an Angel	CBS	9.7
25	Law & Order: Special Victims Unit	NBC	9.6
26	JAG	CBS	9.2
27	The King of Queens	CBS	8.9
28	Yes, Dear	CBS	8.7
29	Family Law	CBS	8.6
29	The District	CBS	8.6
29	CBS Sunday Movie	CBS	8.6

September 2001–May 2002

Rank	Program	Network	Rating
1	Friends	NBC	15.0
2	CSI: Crime Scene Investigation	CBS	14.5
3	ER	NBC	14.2
4	Everybody Loves Raymond	CBS	12.8
5	Law & Order	NBC	12.6
6	Survivor	CBS	11.8
7	Monday Night Football	ABC	11.5
8	The West Wing	NBC	11.4
9	Will & Grace	NBC	11.0
9	Leap of Faith	NBC	11.0
11	Becker	CBS	10.7
12	Law & Order: Special Victims Unit	NBC	10.4
13	60 Minutes	CBS	10.1
14	Frasier	NBC	9.9
14	JAG	CBS	9.9
16	Inside Schwartz	NBC	9.8
16	Judging Amy	CBS	9.8
18	Just Shoot Me!	NBC	9.3
19	The King of Queens	CBS	8.9
20	Yes, Dear	CBS	8.8
20	Crossing Jordan	NBC	8.8
22	The Guardian	CBS	8.4
23	The Practice	ABC	8.3
23	NYPD Blue	ABC	8.3
25	Baby Bob	CBS	8.1
25	Dateline NBC — Friday	NBC	8.1
27	Fear Factor	NBC	7.9
27	Law & Order: Criminal Intent	NBC	7.9
27	Providence	NBC	7.9
30	60 Minutes II	CBS	7.7
30	Family Law	CBS	7.7

September 2002–May 2003

Rank	Program	Network	Rating
1	CSI: Crime Scene Investigation	CBS	16.3
2	Friends	NBC	13.9
3	Joe Millionaire	FOX	13.3
4	ER	NBC	13.1
5	American Idol — Tuesday	FOX	12.6
6	American Idol — Wednesday	FOX	12.5
7	Survivor (Thailand & Amazon)	CBS	11.9
7	Everybody Loves Raymond	CBS	11.9
9	Law & Order	NBC	11.7
10	Monday Night Football	ABC	11.4
11	CSI: Miami	CBS	11.0
11	Will & Grace	NBC	11.0
13	Scrubs	NBC	10.3
14	Law & Order: Special Victims Unit	NBC	10.1
15	Without a Trace	CBS	10.0
16	The Bachelor/The Bachelorette	ABC	9.9
17	60 Minutes	CBS	9.6
18	Judging Amy	CBS	9.5
19	Law & Order: Criminal Intent	NBC	9.4
19	Still Standing	CBS	9.4
21	The West Wing	NBC	9.0
22	JAG	CBS	8.9
23	Good Morning, Miami	NBC	8.7
24	Yes, Dear	CBS	8.6
25	The King of Queens	CBS	8.5
26	Frasier	NBC	8.4
27	The Guardian	CBS	8.3
28	My Big Fat Greek Life	CBS	8.0
29	NYPD Blue	ABC	7.8
30	Fear Factor	NBC	7.7

September 2003–May 2004

Rank	Program	Network	Rating
1	CSI: Crime Scene Investigation	CBS	15.9
2	American Idol — Tuesday	FOX	14.9
3	American Idol — Wednesday	FOX	14.1
4	Friends	NBC	13.6
5	The Apprentice	NBC	13.0
6	ER	NBC	12.9
7	Survivor	CBS	12.3
8	CSI: Miami	CBS	11.9
9	Monday Night Football	ABC	11.2
9	Everybody Loves Raymond	CBS	11.2
11	Without a Trace	CBS	11.1
12	Law & Order	NBC	10.8
13	Will & Grace	NBC	10.4
14	My Big Fat Obnoxious Fiance	FOX	9.9
14	Two and a Half Men	CBS	9.9
16	60 Minutes	CBS	9.4
17	Cold Case	CBS	9.3
18	Law & Order: Special Victims Unit	NBC	8.7
19	Crossing Jordan	NBC	8.6
19	Law & Order: Criminal Intent	NBC	8.6
21	The Bachelor/The Bachelorette	ABC	8.3
22	Fear Factor	NBC	7.9
23	The West Wing	NBC	7.8
23	CBS Sunday Movie	CBS	7.8
23	Navy: NCIS	CBS	7.8
26	Judging Amy	CBS	7.7
26	Still Standing	CBS	7.7
28	Las Vegas	NBC	7.6
29	Average Joe	NBC	7.4
30	Frasier	NBC	7.3
30	The King of Queens	CBS	7.3

September 2004–May 2005

Rank	Program	Network	Rating
1	CSI: Crime Scene Investigation	CBS	16.5
2	American Idol — Tuesday	FOX	15.7
3	American Idol — Wednesday	FOX	15.3
4	Desperate Housewives	ABC	14.5
5	CSI: Miami	CBS	12.4
6	Without a Trace	CBS	12.3
7	Survivor	CBS	12.0
8	Grey's Anatomy	ABC	11.6
9	Everybody Loves Raymond	CBS	11.2
10	Monday Night Football	ABC	10.8
11	Two and a Half Men	CBS	10.6
12	ER	NBC	10.4
13	Lost	ABC	9.8
14	Cold Case	CBS	9.7
14	The Apprentice	NBC	9.7
16	Law & Order: Special Victims Unit	NBC	9.2
16	60 Minutes	CBS	9.2
18	Extreme Makeover: Home Edition	ABC	9.1
18	Medium	NBC	9.1
20	Law & Order	NBC	8.9
20	CSI: NY	CBS	8.9
22	NCIS	CBS	8.8
23	House	FOX	8.3
24	Boston Legal	ABC	8.1
25	Law & Order: Criminal Intent	NBC	7.9
26	Crossing Jordan	NBC	7.7
27	CBS Sunday Movie	CBS	7.6
27	The Amazing Race	CBS	7.6
29	Judging Amy	CBS	7.4
29	The West Wing	NBC	7.4

September 2005–May 2006

Rank	Program	Network	Rating
1	American Idol — Tuesday	FOX	17.6
2	American Idol — Wednesday	FOX	17.2
3	CSI: Crime Scene Investigation	CBS	15.6
4	Desperate Housewives	ABC	13.8
5	Grey's Anatomy	ABC	12.5
6	Without a Trace	CBS	12.3
7	Dancing with the Stars	ABC	12.0
8	CSI: Miami	CBS	11.8
9	Monday Night Football	ABC	10.6
9	House	FOX	10.6
11	Survivor	CBS	10.3
12	NCIS	CBS	9.8
13	Two and a Half Men	CBS	9.7
13	The Unit	CBS	9.7
15	Dancing with the Stars — Results	ABC	9.6
15	Deal or No Deal — Monday	NBC	9.6
17	Cold Case	CBS	9.3
18	Lost	ABC	9.2
18	CSI: NY	CBS	9.2
18	Law & Order: Special Victims Unit	NBC	9.2
21	60 Minutes	CBS	9.0
21	Deal or No Deal — Wednesday	NBC	9.0
23	Extreme Makeover: Home Edition	ABC	8.6
24	Commander in Chief	ABC	8.4
25	The New Adventures of Old Christine	CBS	8.3
25	Unan1mous	FOX	8.3
27	Criminal Minds	CBS	8.2
28	24	FOX	8.1
28	ER	NBC	8.1
30	Out of Practice	CBS	7.8

September 2006–May 2007

Rank	Program	Network	Rating
1	American Idol — Wednesday	FOX	17.3
2	American Idol — Tuesday	FOX	16.8
3	Dancing with the Stars — Monday	ABC	12.7
3	Dancing with the Stars — Tuesday	ABC	12.7
3	Dancing with the Stars — Wednesday	ABC	12.7
6	CSI: Crime Scene Investigation	CBS	12.2
7	Grey's Anatomy	ABC	12.1
8	House	FOX	11.1
9	Desperate Housewives	ABC	10.8
10	CSI: Miami	CBS	10.7
11	Sunday Night Football	NBC	10.5
12	Without a Trace	CBS	9.4
13	Deal or No Deal — Monday	NBC	9.2
14	Two and a Half Men	CBS	9.1
15	NCIS	CBS	9.0
16	CSI: NY	CBS	8.9
16	Cold Case	CBS	8.9
18	Criminal Minds	CBS	8.8
18	Survivor	CBS	8.8
20	60 Minutes	CBS	8.7
20	Shark	CBS	8.7
22	Lost	ABC	8.3
23	Heroes	NBC	8.0
24	Law & Order: Special Victims Unit	NBC	7.9
25	Rules of Engagement	CBS	7.8
26	Extreme Makeover: Home Edition	ABC	7.7
27	Ugly Betty	ABC	7.4
27	ER	NBC	7.4
27	24	FOX	7.4
30	Brothers & Sisters	ABC	7.3
30	The King of Queens	CBS	7.3
30	Are You Smarter than a 5th Grader?	FOX	7.3

September 2007–May 2008

Rank	Program	Network	Rating
1	American Idol — Tuesday	FOX	16.1
2	American Idol — Wednesday	FOX	15.9
3	Dancing with the Stars — Monday	ABC	14.0
4	Dancing with the Stars — Wednesday	ABC	12.6
5	Dancing with the Stars — Tuesday	ABC	12.3
6	Desperate Housewives	ABC	11.6
7	CSI: Crime Scene Investigation	CBS	10.6
8	House	FOX	10.5
9	Grey's Anatomy	ABC	10.4
10	Sunday Night Football	NBC	9.7
11	CSI: Miami	CBS	9.2
11	NCIS	CBS	9.2
13	Without a Trace	CBS	8.8
13	The Moment of Truth	FOX	8.8
15	Two and a Half Men	CBS	8.5
15	Survivor	CBS	8.5
17	60 Minutes	CBS	8.4
18	Criminal Minds	CBS	8.2
19	Samantha Who?	ABC	8.0
20	Lost	ABC	7.9
21	Extreme Makeover: Home Edition	ABC	7.8
22	Brothers & Sisters	ABC	7.6
22	CSI: NY	CBS	7.6
22	Heroes	NBC	7.6
22	Law & Order: Special Victims Unit	NBC	7.6
26	Private Practice	ABC	7.3
27	Law & Order	NBC	7.2
28	Cold Case	CBS	7.1
28	Deal or No Deal — Monday	NBC	7.1
30	Shark	CBS	7.0
30	The Unit	CBS	7.0
30	Hell's Kitchen	FOX	7.0

September 2008–May 2009

Rank	Program	Network	Rating
1	American Idol — Wednesday	FOX	15.1
2	American Idol — Tuesday	FOX	14.6
3	Dancing with the Stars — Monday	ABC	12.9
4	CSI: Crime Scene Investigation	CBS	11.5
5	NCIS	CBS	10.9
6	The Mentalist	CBS	10.8
7	Dancing with the Stars — Tuesday	ABC	10.7
8	Sunday Night Football	NBC	10.0
9	Desperate Housewives	ABC	9.9
10	Grey's Anatomy	ABC	9.6
11	Criminal Minds	CBS	9.4
12	Two and a Half Men	CBS	9.1
12	CSI: Miami	CBS	9.1
14	60 Minutes	CBS	8.9
15	CSI: NY	CBS	8.6
16	Without a Trace	CBS	8.4
17	House	FOX	8.1
18	Survivor	CBS	7.8
18	Eleventh Hour	CBS	7.8
20	Cold Case	CBS	7.5
20	The Bachelor	ABC	7.5
22	24	FOX	7.3
23	Brothers & Sisters	ABC	7.2
24	Rules of Engagement	CBS	7.1
25	Castle	ABC	6.9
26	Law & Order: Special Victims Unit	NBC	6.7
26	ER	NBC	6.7
26	Bones	FOX	6.7
29	Ghost Whisperer	CBS	6.6
29	Lost	ABC	6.6
29	NUMB3RS	CBS	6.6

September 2009–May 2010

Rank	Program	Network	Rating
1	American Idol — Tuesday	FOX	13.7
2	American Idol — Wednesday	FOX	13.3
3	Dancing with the Stars	ABC	12.6
4	NCIS	CBS	11.5
5	Sunday Night Football	NBC	11.3
6	The Mentalist	CBS	10.6
7	Dancing with the Stars — Results	ABC	9.9
8	NCIS: Los Angeles	CBS	9.8
8	Undercover Boss	CBS	9.8
10	CSI: Crime Scene Investigation	CBS	9.7
11	Grey's Anatomy	ABC	9.0
12	Two and a Half Men	CBS	8.9
13	Desperate Housewives	ABC	8.8
14	The Big Bang Theory	CBS	8.5
14	Criminal Minds	CBS	8.5
14	The Good Wife	CBS	8.5
17	60 Minutes	CBS	8.4
18	CSI: Miami	CBS	8.1
19	CSI: NY	CBS	7.9
19	Survivor	CBS	7.9
21	The Bachelor	ABC	7.8
22	House	FOX	7.5
23	Brothers & Sisters	ABC	7.0
24	Castle	ABC	6.9
24	Lost	ABC	6.9
26	The Amazing Race	CBS	6.6
27	Bones	FOX	6.5
28	24	FOX	6.4
29	Cold Case	CBS	6.3
29	Private Practice	ABC	6.3

== 2010s ==
September 2010–May 2011

Rank	Program	Network	Rating
1	American Idol — Wednesday	FOX	14.5
2	Dancing with the Stars	ABC	13.8
3	American Idol — Thursday	FOX	13.4
4	Sunday Night Football	NBC	12.7
5	NCIS	CBS	11.8
5	Dancing with the Stars — Results	ABC	11.8
7	NCIS: Los Angeles	CBS	10.1
8	The Mentalist	CBS	9.6
9	Body of Proof	ABC	9.0
10	Criminal Minds	CBS	8.7
11	The Good Wife	CBS	8.5
12	60 Minutes	CBS	8.4
12	CSI: Crime Scene Investigation	CBS	8.4
14	The Big Bang Theory	CBS	8.0
14	Blue Bloods	CBS	8.0
16	Two and a Half Men	CBS	7.7
17	The Voice	NBC	7.5
17	Hawaii Five-0	CBS	7.5
17	Desperate Housewives	ABC	7.5
17	Grey's Anatomy	ABC	7.5
21	Survivor	CBS	7.4
22	Harry's Law	NBC	7.3
22	CSI: Miami	CBS	7.3
22	Castle	ABC	7.3
25	Undercover Boss	CBS	7.1
25	Modern Family	ABC	7.1
27	The Bachelor	ABC	7.0
27	Bones	FOX	7.0
29	Criminal Minds: Suspect Behavior	CBS	6.9
29	Mike & Molly	CBS	6.9

September 2011–May 2012

Rank	Program	Network	Rating
1	Sunday Night Football	NBC	12.4
2	NCIS	CBS	12.3
3	Dancing with the Stars	ABC	12.0
4	American Idol — Wednesday	FOX	11.8
5	American Idol — Thursday	FOX	11.0
6	Dancing with the Stars — Results	ABC	10.6
7	NCIS: Los Angeles	CBS	10.2
8	The Big Bang Theory	CBS	9.7
9	The Mentalist	CBS	9.3
10	The Voice	NBC	9.2
11	Two and a Half Men	CBS	9.1
12	Person of Interest	CBS	9.0
13	Criminal Minds	CBS	8.6
14	60 Minutes	CBS	8.3
15	Modern Family	ABC	8.1
16	CSI: Crime Scene Investigation	CBS	8.0
16	Castle	ABC	8.0
18	Unforgettable	CBS	7.9
19	Blue Bloods	CBS	7.8
19	The Good Wife	CBS	7.8
21	Hawaii Five-0	CBS	7.6
21	Grey's Anatomy	ABC	7.6
23	The X Factor — Thursday	FOX	7.4
23	The X Factor — Wednesday	FOX	7.4
25	Mike & Molly	CBS	7.2
25	Rob	CBS	7.2
27	CSI: Miami	CBS	7.1
28	2 Broke Girls	CBS	7.0
28	Desperate Housewives	ABC	7.0
28	Once Upon a Time	ABC	7.0

September 2012–May 2013

Rank	Program	Network	Rating
1	NCIS	CBS	13.5
2	Sunday Night Football	NBC	12.4
3	The Big Bang Theory	CBS	11.6
4	NCIS: Los Angeles	CBS	11.0
5	Person of Interest	CBS	10.0
6	Dancing with the Stars	ABC	9.9
7	American Idol — Wednesday	FOX	9.2
7	Dancing with the Stars — Results	ABC	9.2
9	American Idol — Thursday	FOX	8.9
10	Two and a Half Men	CBS	8.7
10	The Voice	NBC	8.7
12	Blue Bloods	CBS	8.5
13	The Voice — Tuesday	NBC	8.4
14	Elementary	CBS	8.3
15	Castle	ABC	8.1
16	60 Minutes	CBS	8.0
16	Criminal Minds	CBS	8.0
18	CSI: Crime Scene Investigation	CBS	7.7
18	Grey's Anatomy	ABC	7.7
18	The Mentalist	CBS	7.7
18	Modern Family	ABC	7.7
18	Vegas	CBS	7.7
23	Body of Proof	ABC	7.3
23	CSI: NY	CBS	7.3
23	The Following	FOX	7.3
23	The Good Wife	CBS	7.3
23	Survivor: Philippines	CBS	7.3
28	2 Broke Girls	CBS	6.8
28	Hawaii Five-0	CBS	6.8
30	Survivor: Caramoan	CBS	6.7

September 2013–May 2014

Rank	Program	Network	Rating
1	Sunday Night Football	NBC	12.6
1	NCIS	CBS	12.6
3	The Big Bang Theory	CBS	12.3
4	NCIS: Los Angeles	CBS	10.3
5	Dancing with the Stars	ABC	10.0
6	The Blacklist	NBC	9.5
7	Person of Interest	CBS	9.0
8	The Voice	NBC	8.9
9	Blue Bloods	CBS	8.8
10	The Voice — Tuesday	NBC	8.6
11	Grey's Anatomy	ABC	8.5
12	Castle	ABC	8.3
13	Criminal Minds	CBS	8.2
13	Scandal	ABC	8.2
15	Resurrection	ABC	8.1
16	CSI: Crime Scene Investigation	CBS	7.8
17	60 Minutes	CBS	7.7
18	Elementary	CBS	7.6
18	The Good Wife	CBS	7.6
18	Modern Family	ABC	7.6
21	Hawaii Five-0	CBS	7.5
22	American Idol — Wednesday	FOX	7.4
23	The Mentalist	CBS	7.3
24	The Millers	CBS	7.1
25	Survivor	CBS	7.0
25	American Idol — Thursday	FOX	7.0
27	Two and a Half Men	CBS	6.8
28	How I Met Your Mother	CBS	6.6
29	Chicago Fire	NBC	6.5
29	Intelligence	CBS	6.5

September 2014–May 2015

Rank	Program	Network	Rating
1	Sunday Night Football	NBC	12.3
2	The Big Bang Theory	CBS	11.6
2	NCIS	CBS	11.6
4	NCIS: New Orleans	CBS	11.3
5	Empire	FOX	10.9
6	Thursday Night Football	CBS	10.6
7	Dancing with the Stars	ABC	9.7
8	Criminal Minds	CBS	9.0
8	Madam Secretary	CBS	9.0
8	Scandal	ABC	9.0
11	Blue Bloods	CBS	8.8
12	The Blacklist	NBC	8.7
13	The Voice: Monday	NBC	8.5
14	Scorpion	CBS	8.4
15	The Voice: Tuesday	NBC	8.3
16	The Good Wife	CBS	8.1
17	60 Minutes	CBS	7.8
17	Grey's Anatomy	ABC	7.8
17	Hawaii Five-0	CBS	7.8
20	How to Get Away with Murder	ABC	7.7
20	Person of Interest	CBS	7.7
22	NCIS: Los Angeles	CBS	7.6
23	Modern Family	ABC	7.5
23	Two and a Half Men	CBS	7.5
25	Elementary	CBS	7.3
25	The Mentalist	CBS	7.3
25	Mom	CBS	7.3
28	Castle	ABC	7.2
28	CSI: Crime Scene Investigation	CBS	7.2
28	CSI: Cyber	CBS	7.2

September 2015–May 2016

Rank	Program	Network	Rating
1	NCIS	CBS	12.8
2	Sunday Night Football	NBC	12.6
3	The Big Bang Theory	CBS	12.5
4	Thursday Night Football	CBS	10.6
5	Empire	FOX	10.2
6	NCIS: New Orleans	CBS	9.4
7	Dancing with the Stars	ABC	8.8
8	Blue Bloods	CBS	8.4
9	The Voice: Monday	NBC	8.2
9	The X-Files	FOX	8.2
11	Grey's Anatomy	ABC	7.9
11	The Voice: Tuesday	NBC	7.9
13	Criminal Minds	CBS	7.8
13	Madam Secretary	CBS	7.8
15	60 Minutes	CBS	7.7
16	Scandal	ABC	7.6
16	Scorpion	CBS	7.6
18	The Blacklist	NBC	7.3
19	How to Get Away with Murder	ABC	7.2
19	Little Big Shots	NBC	7.2
21	Blindspot	NBC	7.1
21	The Good Wife	CBS	7.1
21	NCIS: Los Angeles	CBS	7.1
24	Chicago Fire	NBC	7.0
24	Hawaii Five-0	CBS	7.0
26	American Idol - Wednesday	FOX	6.9
27	American Idol - Thursday	FOX	6.7
28	Code Black	CBS	6.6
28	Survivor	CBS	6.6
30	Chicago Med	NBC	6.5
30	Life in Pieces	CBS	6.5
30	Shades of Blue	NBC	6.5

September 2016–May 2017

Rank	Program	Network	Rating
1	The Big Bang Theory	CBS	11.5
2	NCIS	CBS	11.4
3	Sunday Night Football	NBC	11.1
4	Thursday Night Football	CBS/NBC	9.6
4	Bull	CBS	9.6
6	This Is Us	NBC	9.4
7	Blue Bloods	CBS	8.9
8	NCIS: New Orleans	CBS	8.5
9	Dancing with the Stars	ABC	8.1
10	NCIS: Los Angeles	CBS	7.8
11	60 Minutes	CBS	7.7
12	Hawaii Five-0	CBS	7.6
12	The Voice	NBC	7.6
14	Designated Survivor	ABC	7.5
15	The Voice: Tuesday	NBC	7.4
16	Grey's Anatomy	ABC	7.3
17	Criminal Minds	CBS	6.9
17	Madam Secretary	CBS	6.9
19	Empire	FOX	6.7
19	Scorpion	CBS	6.7
21	Chicago Fire	NBC	6.5
22	Chicago Med	NBC	6.2
22	Survivor	CBS	6.2
24	Little Big Shots	NBC	6.1
24	MacGyver	CBS	6.1
26	Code Black	CBS	6.0
27	The Blacklist	NBC	5.9
27	Mom	CBS	5.9
29	The Bachelor	ABC	5.8
30	Scandal	ABC	5.7

September 2017–May 2018

Rank	Program	Network	Rating
1	The Big Bang Theory	CBS	11.1
2	NCIS	CBS	10.3
2	Sunday Night Football	NBC	10.3
4	This Is Us	NBC	10.2
4	Roseanne	ABC	10.2
6	Young Sheldon	CBS	9.5
7	The Good Doctor	ABC	9.3
8	Bull	CBS	8.9
9	Thursday Night Football	CBS/NBC	8.5
10	Blue Bloods	CBS	8.2
11	NCIS: New Orleans	CBS	7.8
12	The Voice	NBC	7.1
12	60 Minutes	CBS	7.1
12	Grey's Anatomy	ABC	7.1
15	Dancing with the Stars	ABC	6.9
16	Hawaii Five-0	CBS	6.8
16	The Voice: Tuesday	NBC	6.8
18	Mom	CBS	6.7
19	Chicago Med	NBC	6.6
19	NCIS: Los Angeles	CBS	6.6
21	Chicago P.D.	NBC	6.5
22	Chicago Fire	NBC	6.2
23	SEAL Team	CBS	6.1
23	Instinct	CBS	6.1
25	Criminal Minds	CBS	6.0
25	9-1-1	FOX	6.0
25	Dancing with the Stars: Athletes	ABC	6.0
28	Survivor	CBS	5.9
29	S.W.A.T.	CBS	5.8
30	Madam Secretary	CBS	5.6
30	American Idol - Monday	ABC	5.6
30	Law & Order: Special Victims Unit	NBC	5.6

September 2018–May 2019

Rank	Program	Network	Rating
1	Sunday Night Football	NBC	10.9
2	The Big Bang Theory	CBS	10.6
3	NCIS	CBS	9.6
4	Thursday Night Football	FOX	8.7
4	Young Sheldon	CBS	8.7
6	This Is Us	NBC	8.5
7	Blue Bloods	CBS	7.9
7	FBI	CBS	7.9
9	The Good Doctor	ABC	7.4
9	Manifest	NBC	7.4
11	Chicago Fire	NBC	7.2
11	America's Got Talent: The Champions	NBC	7.2
13	Chicago Med	NBC	7.0
13	Bull	CBS	7.0
15	Chicago P.D.	NBC	6.9
15	New Amsterdam	NBC	6.9
17	NCIS: New Orleans	CBS	6.8
18	60 Minutes	CBS	6.7
19	The Voice	NBC	6.6
20	Grey's Anatomy	ABC	6.5
21	Mom	CBS	6.4
22	The Voice: Tuesday	NBC	6.2
22	Hawaii Five-0	CBS	6.2
22	NCIS: Los Angeles	CBS	6.2
25	The Masked Singer	FOX	6.0
26	9-1-1	FOX	5.9
27	The Conners	ABC	5.8
27	God Friended Me	CBS	5.8
29	Survivor	CBS	5.5
29	Dancing with the Stars	ABC	5.5

September 2019–May 2020

Rank	Program	Network	Rating
1	Sunday Night Football	NBC	20.09
2	NCIS	CBS	15.34
3	Thursday Night Football	FOX	15.05
4	FBI	CBS	12.55
5	Blue Bloods	CBS	11.96
6	Chicago Fire	NBC	11.70
7	This Is Us	NBC	11.55
8	Young Sheldon	CBS	11.45
9	Chicago P.D.	NBC	11.23
10	Chicago Med	NBC	11.22
11	The Good Doctor	ABC	10.82
12	The Masked Singer	FOX	10.73
13	Bull	CBS	10.61
14	60 Minutes	CBS	10.46
15	9-1-1	FOX	10.42
16	The Voice	NBC	10.23
17	FBI: Most Wanted	CBS	10.20
18	New Amsterdam	NBC	9.70
19	Hawaii Five-0	CBS	9.68
20	NCIS: New Orleans	CBS	9.58
21	The Voice: Tuesday	NBC	9.53
22	Grey's Anatomy	ABC	9.39
23	Survivor	CBS	9.30
24	9-1-1: Lone Star	FOX	9.09
25	America's Got Talent: The Champions	NBC	8.92
26	Magnum P.I.	CBS	8.91
26	NCIS: Los Angeles	CBS	8.91
28	American Idol: Monday	ABC	8.54
29	Mom	CBS	8.52
29	Station 19	ABC	8.52

== 2020s ==
September 2020–May 2021

Rank	Program	Network	Rating
1	Sunday Night Football	NBC	16.50
2	Thursday Night Football	FOX	13.42
3	NCIS	CBS	12.58
4	The Equalizer	CBS	12.07
5	FBI	CBS	10.98
6	60 Minutes	CBS	10.73
7	Chicago Fire	NBC	10.23
8	Blue Bloods	CBS	10.16
9	Chicago Med	NBC	9.74
10	Chicago P.D.	NBC	9.73
11	9-1-1	FOX	9.62
12	Young Sheldon	CBS	9.45
13	This Is Us	NBC	9.32
14	FBI: Most Wanted	CBS	8.83
15	9-1-1: Lone Star	FOX	8.71
16	Bull	CBS	8.59
17	The Voice	NBC	8.40
18	The Voice: Tuesday	NBC	8.30
19	The Good Doctor	ABC	8.16
19	Grey's Anatomy	ABC	8.16
21	Law & Order: Organized Crime	NBC	7.83
22	NCIS: Los Angeles	CBS	7.80
23	The Masked Singer	FOX	7.56
24	Magnum P.I.	CBS	7.48
25	American Idol	ABC	7.42
26	Big Sky	ABC	7.35
27	NCIS: New Orleans	CBS	7.22
28	Celebrity Wheel of Fortune	ABC	7.15
29	The Rookie	ABC	7.11
29	Station 19	ABC	7.11

September 2021–May 2022

Rank	Program	Network	Rating
1	Sunday Night Football	NBC	18.00
2	Thursday Night Football	FOX	15.40
3	NCIS	CBS	10.90
4	FBI	CBS	10.29
5	Chicago Fire	NBC	9.81
6	Blue Bloods	CBS	9.78
7	The Equalizer	CBS	9.42
8	Young Sheldon	CBS	9.21
9	60 Minutes	CBS	9.19
10	Chicago P.D.	NBC	9.15
11	Chicago Med	NBC	9.09
12	FBI: Most Wanted	CBS	8.72
13	Ghosts	CBS	8.41
14	NCIS: Hawaiʻi	CBS	8.28
15	FBI: International	CBS	8.21
16	The Voice	NBC	8.12
17	The Voice: Tuesday	NBC	8.11
18	This Is Us	NBC	7.76
19	La Brea	NBC	7.43
20	Bull	CBS	7.37
21	Magnum P.I.	CBS	7.34
22	Survivor	CBS	7.32
23	American Idol	ABC	7.29
24	NCIS: Los Angeles	CBS	7.28
25	9-1-1	FOX	7.27
26	American Idol: Monday	ABC	6.99
27	9-1-1: Lone Star	FOX	6.88
28	Law & Order: Special Victims Unit	NBC	6.83
29	CSI: Vegas	CBS	6.80
29	The Good Doctor	ABC	6.80

September 2022–May 2023

Rank	Program	Network	Rating
1	Sunday Night Football	NBC	18.13
2	NCIS	CBS	9.83
3	FBI	CBS	9.52
4	Young Sheldon	CBS	9.28
5	Chicago Fire	NBC	9.25
6	Blue Bloods	CBS	9.24
7	Ghosts	CBS	9.08
8	60 Minutes	CBS	8.80
9	Chicago Med	NBC	8.48
10	The Equalizer	CBS	8.28
11	Chicago P.D.	NBC	8.27
12	Fire Country	CBS	8.25
13	FBI: Most Wanted	CBS	8.00
14	FBI: International	CBS	7.72
15	NCIS: Hawaiʻi	CBS	7.50
16	The Voice	NBC	7.30
17	The Voice: Tuesday	NBC	7.21
18	9-1-1	FOX	7.09
19	Law & Order: Special Victims Unit	NBC	6.87
20	American Idol	ABC	6.79
20	East New York	CBS	6.79
22	Survivor	CBS	6.71
23	S.W.A.T.	CBS	6.68
24	The Rookie	ABC	6.48
25	The Neighborhood	CBS	6.45
26	So Help Me Todd	CBS	6.37
27	Jeopardy! Masters	ABC	6.35
28	The Good Doctor	ABC	6.23
29	NCIS: Los Angeles	CBS	6.15
30	Bob Hearts Abishola	CBS	6.10

September 2023–May 2024

Rank	Program	Network	Rating
1	Sunday Night Football	NBC	19.84
2	Monday Night Football	ABC	11.99
3	Tracker	CBS	10.80
4	NCIS	CBS	9.66
5	Young Sheldon	CBS	9.10
6	FBI	CBS	8.96
7	Chicago Fire	NBC	8.79
8	Blue Bloods	CBS	8.45
9	60 Minutes	CBS	8.27
10	Ghosts	CBS	8.21
11	Chicago Med	NBC	8.20
12	Chicago P.D.	NBC	7.96
13	The Equalizer	CBS	7.90
14	NCIS: Hawaiʻi	CBS	7.79
15	Elsbeth	CBS	7.45
16	FBI: Most Wanted	CBS	7.39
17	Fire Country	CBS	7.33
18	FBI: International	CBS	7.21
19	The Voice	NBC	7.14
20	Law & Order: Special Victims Unit	NBC	6.91
21	The Voice: Tuesday	NBC	6.89
22	9-1-1	ABC	6.86
23	Will Trent	ABC	6.74
24	NCIS: Sydney	CBS	6.53
25	Survivor	CBS	6.50
26	So Help Me Todd	CBS	6.18
27	S.W.A.T.	CBS	6.17
28	CSI: Vegas	CBS	6.15
29	The Golden Bachelor	ABC	5.94
30	The Irrational	NBC	5.93

September 2024–May 2025

Rank	Program	Network	Rating
1	Sunday Night Football	NBC	21.6
2	Tracker	CBS	17.4
3	High Potential	ABC	16.1
4	Matlock	CBS	16.0
5	Georgie & Mandy's First Marriage	CBS	12.1
5	Ghosts	CBS	12.1
7	Monday Night Football	ABC	11.9
8	Elsbeth	CBS	11.5
9	Will Trent	ABC	11.4
10	9-1-1	ABC	11.1
11	Watson	CBS	11.0
12	Shifting Gears	ABC	10.9
13	The Rookie	ABC	10.8
14	FBI	CBS	10.6
14	NCIS	CBS	10.6
16	Chicago Fire	NBC	10.3
17	Blue Bloods	CBS	10.1
18	Chicago P.D.	NBC	9.8
19	Chicago Med	NBC	9.7
20	Fire Country	CBS	9.6
21	NCIS: Origins	CBS	9.3
22	Abbott Elementary	ABC	8.8
23	60 Minutes	CBS	8.7
23	Law & Order: Special Victims Unit	NBC	8.7
25	FBI: Most Wanted	CBS	8.4
26	Survivor 48	CBS	8.3
26	The Voice	NBC	8.3
28	The Equalizer	CBS	8.2
28	FBI: International	CBS	8.2
30	Survivor 47	CBS	7.9

== Multiple rankings in the Top 30 ==
49 seasons

- 60 Minutes (CBS)

34 seasons

- Monday Night Football (ABC)

22 seasons

- NCIS (CBS)
- Survivor (CBS)

19 seasons

- Sunday Night Football (NBC)

18 seasons

- American Idol (FOX/ABC)
- Gunsmoke (CBS)

17 seasons

- Disneyland/Walt Disney's Wonderful World of Color/The Wonderful World of Disney (ABC/NBC)
- Grey's Anatomy (ABC)
- The Red Skelton Show (NBC/CBS)
- The Toast of the Town/The Ed Sullivan Show (CBS)

15 seasons

- Blue Bloods (CBS)
- CSI: Crime Scene Investigation (CBS)
- Law & Order: Special Victims Unit (NBC)
- The Voice (NBC)

14 seasons

- Dancing with the Stars (ABC)
- ER (NBC)
- NCIS: Los Angeles (CBS)

13 seasons

- Criminal Minds (CBS)

12 seasons

- All in the Family/Archie Bunker's Place (CBS)
- Bonanza (NBC)
- Law & Order (NBC)
- The Lucy Show/Here's Lucy (CBS)
- Two and a Half Men (CBS)

11 seasons

- Chicago Fire (NBC)
- Frasier (NBC)
- Murder, She Wrote (CBS)
- My Three Sons (ABC/CBS)

10 seasons

- The Big Bang Theory (CBS)
- Chicago Med (NBC)
- CSI: Miami (CBS)
- Dallas (CBS)
- Friends (NBC)
- Hawaii Five-0 (CBS)
- I've Got a Secret (CBS)
- The Jack Benny Show (CBS)
- M*A*S*H (CBS)
- NYPD Blue (ABC)
- Roseanne/The Conners (ABC)

9 seasons

- The King of Queens (CBS)
- The Carol Burnett Show (CBS)
- Cheers (NBC)
- Dragnet (NBC)
- Happy Days (ABC)
- Lassie (CBS)
- You Bet Your Life (NBC)

8 seasons

- The Andy Griffith Show (CBS)
- The Beverly Hillbillies (CBS)
- Chicago P.D. (NBC)
- The Cosby Show (NBC)
- Desperate Housewives (ABC)
- Everybody Loves Raymond (CBS)
- General Electric Theater (CBS)
- Hawaii Five-O (CBS)
- Home Improvement (ABC)
- The Jeffersons (CBS)
- Knots Landing (CBS)
- Little House on the Prairie/Little House: A New Beginning (NBC)
- 9-1-1 (ABC/FOX)
- One Day at a Time (CBS)
- Thursday Night Football (CBS/NBC/FOX)
- 20/20 (ABC)
- The Virginian/The Men from Shiloh (NBC)

7 seasons

- Alice (CBS)
- Arthur Godfrey's Talent Scouts (CBS)
- Castle (ABC)
- Cold Case (CBS)
- CSI: NY (CBS)
- The Danny Thomas Show (CBS)
- The F.B.I. (ABC)
- FBI (CBS)
- The Golden Girls (NBC)
- The Good Wife (CBS)
- The Jackie Gleason Show (1962-1970) (CBS)
- Laverne & Shirley (ABC)
- The Love Boat (ABC)
- The Mentalist (CBS)
- Murphy Brown (CBS)
- NCIS: New Orleans (CBS)
- Three's Company (ABC)
- The Waltons (CBS)
- What's My Line? (CBS)
- Without a Trace (CBS)
- Young Sheldon (CBS)

6 seasons

- The Bachelor (ABC)
- Bewitched (ABC)
- Bull (CBS)
- Coach (ABC)
- Dateline NBC (NBC)
- Dynasty (ABC)
- Falcon Crest (CBS)
- FBI: Most Wanted (CBS)
- Fireside Theatre (NBC)
- Full House (ABC)
- The Good Doctor (ABC)
- Growing Pains (ABC)
- Have Gun – Will Travel (CBS)
- House (FOX)
- The Life of Riley (NBC)
- I Love Lucy (CBS)
- Ironside (NBC)
- Judging Amy (CBS)
- L.A. Law (NBC)
- Lost (ABC)
- The Mary Tyler Moore Show (CBS)
- Matlock (NBC/ABC)
- Newhart (CBS)
- Night Court (NBC)
- The Perry Como Show (NBC)
- Perry Mason (CBS)
- Primetime Live (ABC)
- Sanford and Son (NBC)
- Seinfeld (NBC)
- This Is Us (NBC)
- Trapper John, M.D. (CBS)
- Wagon Train (NBC/ABC)
- The West Wing (NBC)
- Who's the Boss? (ABC)

5 seasons

- Arthur Godfrey and His Friends (CBS)
- The Colgate Comedy Hour (NBC)
- The Dean Martin Show (NBC)
- A Different World (NBC)
- The Dukes of Hazzard (CBS)
- The Equalizer (CBS)
- Fantasy Island (ABC)
- The Ford Show (NBC)
- Gomer Pyle, U.S.M.C. (CBS)
- Head of the Class (ABC)
- In the Heat of the Night (NBC)
- JAG (CBS)
- The Lawrence Welk Show (ABC)
- Magnum, P.I. (1980-1988) (CBS)
- The Millionaire (CBS)
- Modern Family (ABC)
- Mom (CBS)
- Pabst Blue Ribbon Bouts (CBS)
- Private Secretary (CBS)
- Rawhide (CBS)
- The Real McCoys (ABC)
- Rowan & Martin's Laugh-In (NBC)
- Texaco Star Theater/The Milton Berle Show/The Buick-Berle Show (NBC)
- This Is Your Life (NBC)
- Touched by an Angel (CBS)
- Unsolved Mysteries (NBC)

4 seasons

- The A-Team (NBC)
- Adam-12 (NBC)
- Alfred Hitchcock Presents (CBS)
- Barnaby Jones (CBS)
- Barney Miller (ABC)
- Becker (CBS)
- The Blacklist (NBC)
- The Bob Newhart Show (CBS)
- Brothers & Sisters (ABC)
- Candid Camera (CBS)
- Cannon (CBS)
- Charlie's Angels (ABC)
- Cheyenne (ABC)
- Daniel Boone (NBC)
- December Bride (CBS)
- The Dick Van Dyke Show (CBS)
- The Doris Day Show (CBS)
- The Drew Carey Show (ABC)
- Eight Is Enough (ABC)
- Empty Nest (NBC)
- Extreme Makeover: Home Edition (ABC)
- The Facts of Life (NBC)
- The Fall Guy (ABC)
- Family Affair (CBS)
- Family Ties (NBC)
- FBI: International (CBS)
- Ford Theatre (NBC)
- The George Burns and Gracie Allen Show (CBS)
- Ghosts (CBS)
- Gillette Cavalcade of Sports (NBC)
- Good Times (CBS)
- Green Acres (CBS)
- Hunter (NBC)
- Kate & Allie (CBS)
- Law & Order: Criminal Intent (NBC)
- The Lawman (ABC)
- The Life and Legend of Wyatt Earp (ABC)
- Madam Secretary (CBS)
- Mama (CBS)
- Mannix (CBS)
- Marcus Welby, M.D. (ABC)
- Maude (CBS)
- Medical Center (CBS)
- The Mod Squad (ABC)
- Person of Interest (CBS)
- Petticoat Junction (CBS)
- Philco TV Playhouse (NBC)
- The Price Is Right (NBC)
- Real People (NBC)
- The Rifleman (ABC)
- Scandal (ABC)
- Simon & Simon (CBS)
- That's Incredible! (ABC)
- 24 (FOX)
- Walker, Texas Ranger (CBS)
- Will & Grace (NBC)
- Wings (NBC)
- The Wonder Years (ABC)
- The X-Files (FOX)
- Your Hit Parade (NBC)

3 seasons

- ALF (NBC)
- Amen (NBC)
- America's Funniest Home Videos (ABC)
- The Big Story (NBC)
- Bones (FOX)
- Chicago Hope (CBS)
- CHiPs (NBC)
- Crossing Jordan (NBC)
- Deal or No Deal (NBC)
- Dennis the Menace (CBS)
- Designing Women (CBS)
- Dharma & Greg (ABC)
- Diff'rent Strokes (NBC)
- Dr. Kildare (NBC)
- Elementary (CBS)
- Empire (FOX)
- Evening Shade (CBS)
- Family Law (CBS)
- Family Matters (ABC)
- Father Knows Best (NBC/CBS)
- Fear Factor (NBC)
- Fire Country (CBS)
- The Flintstones (ABC)
- The Flip Wilson Show (NBC)
- The Fresh Prince of Bel-Air (NBC)
- The Garry Moore Show (CBS)
- Goodyear TV Playhouse (NBC)
- Grace Under Fire (ABC)
- Hart to Hart (ABC)
- Hazel (NBC)
- Highway to Heaven (NBC)
- Hill Street Blues (NBC)
- Hotel (ABC)
- House Calls (CBS)
- Just Shoot Me! (NBC)
- Kojak (CBS)
- Kraft Television Theatre (NBC)
- The Jackie Gleason Show (1952-1957) (CBS)
- The Lineup (CBS)
- The Lone Ranger (ABC)
- Mad About You (NBC)
- Magnum, P.I. (2018-2024) (CBS/NBC)
- The Masked Singer (FOX)
- Mayberry R.F.D. (CBS)
- Moonlighting (ABC)
- NCIS: Hawaiʻi (CBS)
- 9-1-1: Lone Star (FOX)
- Northern Exposure (CBS)
- The Partridge Family (ABC)
- People Are Funny (NBC)
- The Practice (ABC)
- Providence (NBC)
- Rhoda (CBS)
- The Rookie (ABC)
- The Rookies (ABC)
- S.W.A.T. (CBS)
- Scarecrow & Mrs. King (CBS)
- Scorpion (CBS)
- 77 Sunset Strip (ABC)
- The Simpsons (FOX)
- The Six Million Dollar Man (ABC)
- 60 Minutes II (CBS)
- The $64,000 Question (CBS)
- The Smothers Brothers Comedy Hour (CBS)
- Soap (ABC)
- Spin City (ABC)
- The Streets of San Francisco (ABC)
- 227 (NBC)
- Valerie/Valerie's Family/The Hogan Family (NBC)
- Welcome Back, Kotter (ABC)
- Yes, Dear (CBS)
- Your Show of Shows (NBC)
- Zane Grey Theater (CBS)

2 seasons

- The Adventures of Robin Hood (CBS)
- The Alan Young Show (CBS)
- All Star Revue (NBC)
- The Amazing Race (CBS)
- America's Funniest People (ABC)
- America's Got Talent: The Champions (NBC)
- Amos 'n' Andy (CBS)
- The Ann Sothern Show (CBS)
- The Apprentice (NBC)
- Armstrong Circle Theatre (NBC)
- The Bachelorette (ABC)
- Baretta (ABC)
- Ben Casey (ABC)
- The Big Event (NBC)
- Big Town (CBS)
- The Bionic Woman (ABC)
- Bob Hope Presents the Chrysler Theatre (NBC)
- Body of Proof (ABC)
- Cagney & Lacey (CBS)
- Caroline in the City (NBC)
- Chico and the Man (NBC)
- Climax! (CBS)
- Code Black (CBS)
- Cosby (CBS)
- CSI: Vegas (CBS)
- Cybill (CBS)
- Daktari (CBS)
- Dave's World (CBS)
- Dear John (NBC)
- The Defenders (CBS)
- Diagnosis: Murder (CBS)
- Dr. Quinn, Medicine Woman (CBS)
- The Donna Reed Show (ABC)
- Doogie Howser, M.D. (ABC)
- Ellen (ABC)
- Elsbeth (CBS)
- Flipper (NBC)
- 48 Hours (CBS)
- The Fugitive (ABC)
- Gangbusters (NBC)
- The George Gobel Show (NBC)
- Get Smart (NBC)
- Gilligan's Island (CBS)
- The Glen Campbell Goodtime Hour (CBS)
- Grand (NBC)
- The Guardian (CBS)
- Hee Haw (CBS)
- Heroes (NBC)
- Hogan's Heroes (CBS)
- Hopalong Cassidy (NBC)
- How to Get Away with Murder (ABC)
- I Dream of Jeannie (NBC)
- Jesse (NBC)
- The Jim Nabors Hour (CBS)
- Julia (NBC)
- Kung Fu (ABC)
- Little Big Shots (NBC)
- The Loretta Young Show (NBC)
- Lou Grant (CBS)
- Love & War (CBS)
- Lux Video Theatre (NBC)
- Major Dad (CBS)
- Man Against Crime (NBC)
- The Many Loves of Dobie Gillis (CBS)
- Martin Kane, Private Eye (NBC)
- Maverick (ABC)
- McHale's Navy (ABC)
- Miami Vice (NBC)
- Mike & Molly (CBS)
- Mork & Mindy (ABC)
- My Favorite Martian (CBS)
- The Naked Truth (ABC/NBC)
- Name That Tune (CBS)
- The Nanny (CBS)
- New Amsterdam (NBC)
- Our Miss Brooks (CBS)
- The Patty Duke Show (ABC)
- Peter Gunn (NBC)
- The Phil Silvers Show (CBS)
- Police Woman (NBC)
- Private Practice (ABC)
- The Red Buttons Show (CBS)
- Rescue 911 (CBS)
- Riptide (NBC)
- Robert Montgomery Presents (NBC)
- Route 66 (CBS)
- The Roy Rogers Show (NBC)
- Rules of Engagement (CBS)
- Shark (CBS)
- The Single Guy (NBC)
- So Help Me Todd (CBS)
- The Sonny & Cher Comedy Hour (CBS)
- Station 19 (ABC)
- Still Standing (CBS)
- Strike It Rich (CBS)
- Sugarfoot (ABC)
- Tales of Wells Fargo (NBC)
- Taxi (ABC)
- 3rd Rock from the Sun (NBC)
- To Tell the Truth (CBS)
- Too Close for Comfort (ABC)
- Tracker (CBS)
- Treasury Men in Action (NBC)
- TV's Bloopers & Practical Jokes (NBC)
- 2 Broke Girls (CBS)
- Undercover Boss (CBS)
- The Unit (CBS)
- Vega$ (ABC)
- Veronica's Closet (NBC)
- Wanted: Dead or Alive (CBS)
- Webster (ABC)
- What's Happening!! (ABC)
- Who Wants to Be a Millionaire (ABC)
- Will Trent (ABC)
