= Ellen Douglas =

American novelist

- Born: Josephine Ayres Haxton; July 12, 1921; Natchez, Mississippi
- Died: November 7, 2012 (aged 91)
- Education: University of Mississippi
- Children: Ayres Haxton, Brooks Haxton, Richard Haxton
- Writing career
- Notable works: A Family's Affairs (1961) Black Cloud, White Cloud (1963) Apostles of Light (1973) The Rock Cried Out (1979)

Ellen Douglas was the pen name of Josephine Ayres Haxton (July 12, 1921 – November 7, 2012), an American author. Her 1973 novel Apostles of Light was a National Book Award nominee.

== Biography ==
Douglas was born in New Orleans, Louisiana and grew up in Hope, Arkansas, and Alexandria, Louisiana. She graduated from the University of Mississippi in 1942 and later settled in Greenville, Mississippi with her husband Kenneth Haxton. She had three sons with Haxton: Richard, Ayres, and Brooks Haxton, the latter a notable, award-winning poet and writer.

Douglas taught writing at Ole' Miss, where she was writer-in-residence from 1979 to 1983. One of her creative writing students was Larry Brown, a local Oxford firefighter who went on to publish many acclaimed works of fiction.

She adopted the pen name Ellen Douglas before the publication of A Family’s Affairs to protect the privacy of two aunts, on whose lives she had based much of the plot.

Douglas died of heart failure at the age of 91 on November 7, 2012.

Margalit Fox writes that Douglas's work "explored the epochal divide between the Old South and the New, examining vast, difficult subjects — race relations, tensions between the sexes, the conflict between the needs of the individual and those of the community — through the small, clear prism of domestic life."

== Selected bibliography ==
=== Novels and stories ===
- A Family's Affairs (1961)
- Black Cloud, White Cloud: Two Novellas and Two Stories (1963)
- "On the Lake", in Prize Stories 1963 (1963)
- Where The Dreams Cross (1968)
- Apostles of Light (Houghton Mifflin 1973)
- The Rock Cried Out (1979)
- A Lifetime Burning (Random House 1982)
- A Long Night (1986)
- The Magic Carpet and Other Tales (1987)
- Can't Quit You, Baby (Scribners 1988)

=== Nonfiction ===
- Truth: Four Stories I Am Finally Old Enough to Tell (Algonquin Books 1998) ISBN 978-1-565-12214-7
- Witnessing (University Press of Mississippi 2004) ISBN 978-1-578-06670-4

== Awards and recognition ==
- "On the Lake", one of Douglas's short stories, was included in the O. Henry collection in 1961.
- A Family's Affairs was awarded the Houghton Mifflin fellowship in 1961 and was recognized as one of the five best novels of the year by The New York Times.
- Black Cloud, White Cloud was named one of the five best works of fiction by The New York Times in 1963.
- Apostles of Light was nominated in 1973 for the National Book Award by the National Book Committee.
- Awarded a National Endowment for the Humanities fellowship in 1976
- Twice a recipient of a Mississippi Institute of Arts and Letters Award for literature in 1979 and 1983.
- Recognized as the first recipient of the Hillsdale Prize for Fiction from the Fellowship of Southern Writers
