= Little Sisters of the Poor Home for the Aged =

Little Sisters of the Poor Home for the Aged may refer to:

In Australia

- Little Sisters of the Poor Home for the Aged (Melbourne, Victoria), listed on the Victorian Heritage Register

In Spain

- House of Hermanitas de los Pobres (House of the Little Sisters of the Poor), Madrid, Spain

In the United States

- Little Sisters of the Poor Home for the Aged (Minneapolis, Minnesota), listed on the National Register of Historic Places (NRHP)
- Little Sisters of the Poor Home for the Aged (Nashville, Tennessee), listed on the NRHP in Nashville, Tennessee
- St. Sophia Home of the Little Sisters of the Poor, Richmond, Virginia, listed on the NRHP in Richmond, Virginia
- Home for the Aged Men and Women (Washington, DC)

== See also ==
- Little Sisters of the Poor Saints Peter and Paul Home v. Pennsylvania
- Little Sisters of the Poor
