= Smith-Little-Mars House =

Historic house in Tennessee, United States

- Smith--Little--Mars House
- U.S. National Register of Historic Places
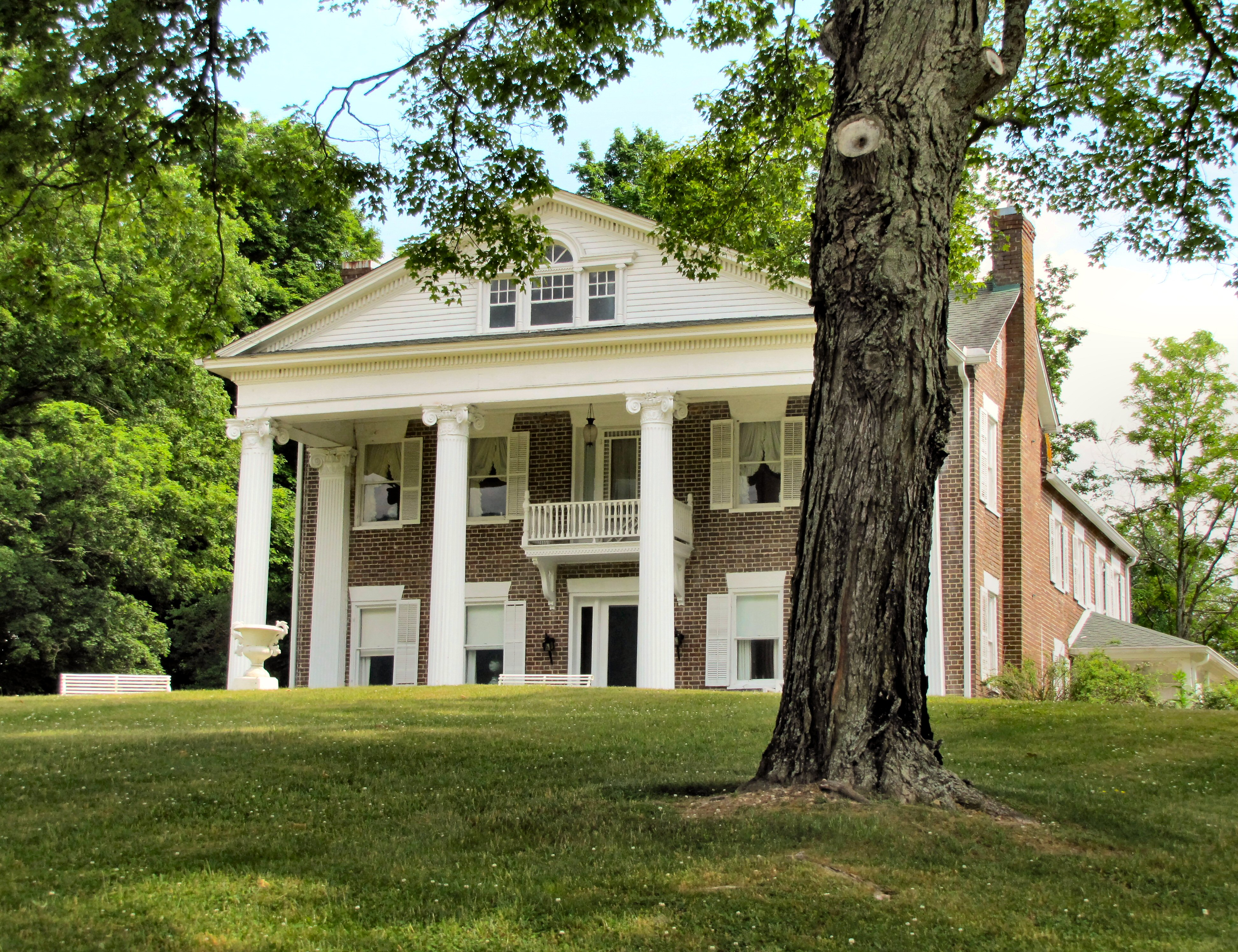
- The Smith-Little-Mars House in 2015

- Location within Tennessee Location within the United States
- Nearest city: LaFollette, Tennessee
- Coordinates: 36°26′41″N 83°55′45″W
- Area: 9.5 acres (3.8 ha)
- Built: 1840
- Architect: Little, Silas
- Architectural style: Federal
- NRHP reference No.: 76001767
- Added to NRHP: November 7, 1976

The Smith-Little-Mars House is a historic mansion near LaFollette, Tennessee, USA. It was listed on the National Register of Historic Places in 1976. Built in 1840 by slaves for Frank Smith in the Federal style, the house is one of the few antebellum homes remaining in the area. It is conjectured that the slaves who built the house belonged to Frank Kincaid II, because of the similarity in design and brickwork to other houses in Campbell and Clairborne counties. In the late 1890s, the house was purchased by Silas Little, a wealthy clothing store owner, who added Victorian embellishments.
