= Little House on the Prairie (disambiguation) =

Little House on the Prairie is a series of American children's novels by Laura Ingalls Wilder, or the media franchise based on it.

Little House on the Prairie may also refer to:

== Related to the Ingalls Wilder story ==
- Little House on the Prairie (novel), the third book of the Little House series
- Little House on the Prairie (film), a 1974 TV movie based on the above book
- Little House on the Prairie (feature film) an upcoming film directed by Sean Durkin
- Little House on the Prairie (musical), a musical adaptation of the books
- Little House on the Prairie (1974 TV series), a 1974–1983 American television series
- Little House on the Prairie (2005 TV series), a 2005 American miniseries
- Little House on the Prairie (2026 TV series), a 2026 Netflix television series

== Unrelated ==
- A nickname for the Stott Hall Farm on the M62 motorway in England

== See also ==
- Beyond the Prairie: The True Story of Laura Ingalls Wilder, a two-part 2000 and 2002 television movie
- Little House (disambiguation)
