= St. Sophia Home of the Little Sisters of the Poor =

Historic Catholic hospital in Virginia, US

- U.S. National Register of Historic Places
- Virginia Landmarks Register
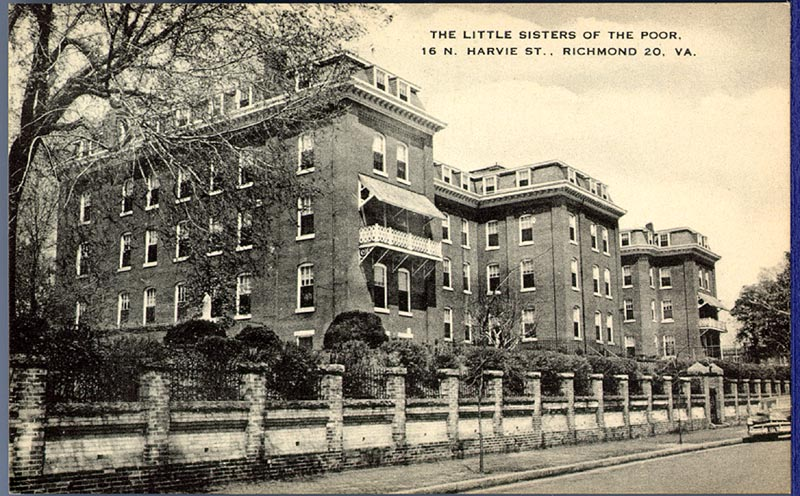
- St. Sophia Home of the Little Sisters of the Poor

- Location within Virginia Location within the United States
- Location: 16 N. Harvie St., Richmond, Virginia
- Coordinates: 37°32′50″N 77°27′32″W
- Area: 3 acres (1.2 ha)
- Built: 1832, 1877-1881, 1894, 1950s
- Architectural style: Second Empire, Italianate
- NRHP reference No.: 80004217
- VLR No.: 127-0319

Significant dates
- Added to NRHP: May 7, 1980
- Designated VLR: February 19, 1980

St. Sophia Home of the Little Sisters of the Poor, also known as the Little Sisters of the Poor Home for the Aged, is a historic Catholic hospital and convent located in Richmond, Virginia, United States. The original residence known as "Warsaw" was built in 1832, and subsequently incorporated into the Italianate style brick hospital building between 1877 and 1881. A convent wing was added in 1894 and a service wing in the 1950s. The building is a 3 1/2-story, brick structure on a brick basement with a Second Empire-style mansard roof.

The charity hospital and home for the elderly was operated by the Little Sisters of the Poor order, and was used through most of the 20th century. As late as 1939 there were 15 sisters serving approximately 160 residents. In 1976, the Little Sisters of the Poor and residents of St. Sophia's moved to a new modern complex in Henrico County. The building sat unoccupied until 1982 when it was repurposed into a condominium complex named “The Warsaw”.

It was listed on the National Register of Historic Places in 1980.
