= Jim Little House =

Historic house in Arkansas, United States

- U.S. National Register of Historic Places
- Location within Arkansas Location within the United States
- Location: Walnut St. E of jct. with Front St., Bradford, Arkansas
- Coordinates: 35°25′24″N 91°27′11″W
- Area: less than one acre
- Built: 1895
- Built by: Jim Little
- Architectural style: Vernacular T-shaped
- MPS: White County MPS
- NRHP reference No.: 91001315
- Added to NRHP: September 5, 1991

The Jim Little House was a historic house on East Walnut Street, between North Front and North Second Streets, in Bradford, Arkansas. It was a T-shaped wood-frame structure, with a gable roof, novelty siding, and vernacular style. It was built in 1895, and was one of White County's few surviving 19th-century houses.

The house was listed on the National Register of Historic Places in 1991. It has been listed as destroyed in the Arkansas Historic Preservation Program database.

== See also ==
- National Register of Historic Places listings in White County, Arkansas
