= Madeleine A. Polland =

Irish author

- Born: Madeleine Angela Cahill Polland; 31 May 1918; Ireland
- Died: 2005 (aged 86–87)
- Occupation: Writer
- Writing career
- Pen name: Frances Adrian
- Genres: Novels and children's fiction

Madeleine Angela Polland (31 May 1918 – 2005) was a prolific Irish children's author.

== Life and career ==
Born Madeleine Angela Cahill in Kinsale, County Cork, Ireland on 31 May 1918, her father moved the family to England while she was still in school. She attended Hitchin Girls' Grammar School in Hertfordshire from 1929 to 1937. She went on to work as an assistant librarian in Letchworth, Hertfordshire, from 1939 until 1942 and again from 1945 to 1946. In the Second World War she worked for the Women's Auxiliary Air Force at a radar installation (1942–1945).

In 1946, she married Arthur Joseph Polland. They had two children. Polland also wrote under the name Frances Adrian. She lived in later years in Málaga, Spain. Polland wrote historical fiction which spanned multiple countries. She travelled to many of the locations herself.

== Bibliography ==
- Children of the Red King, 1960
- The Town across the Water, 1961
- Beorn the Proud, 1961
- Fingal's Quest, 1961
- The White Twilight, 1962
- Chuiraquimba and the Black Robes, 1962
- City of the Golden House, 1963
- The Queen's Blessing, 1963
- Flame over Tara, 1964
- Thicker Than Water, 1964
- Mission to Cathay, 1965
- Queen without Crown, 1965
- Deirdre, 1967
- The Little Spot of Bother (in the U.S. as Minutes of a Murder), 1967
- To Tell My People, 1968
- Stranger in the Hills, 1968
- Random Army (in the U.S. as Shattered Summer), 1969
- To Kill a King, 1970
- Alhambra, 1970
- A Family Affair, 1971
- Package to Spain, 1971
- Daughter to Poseidon (in the U.S. as Daughter of the Sea), 1972
- Prince of the Double Axe, 1976
- Double Shadow, 1977
- Sabrina, 1979
- All Their Kingdoms, 1981
- The Heart Speaks Many Ways, 1982
- No Price Too High, 1984
- As It Was in the Beginning, 1987
- Rich Man's Flowers, 1989
- The Pomegranate House, 1992
