= Little House (Shepherdstown, West Virginia) =

20th century miniature house in West Virginia

Coordinates: 39°25′51.65″N 77°48′14.86″W

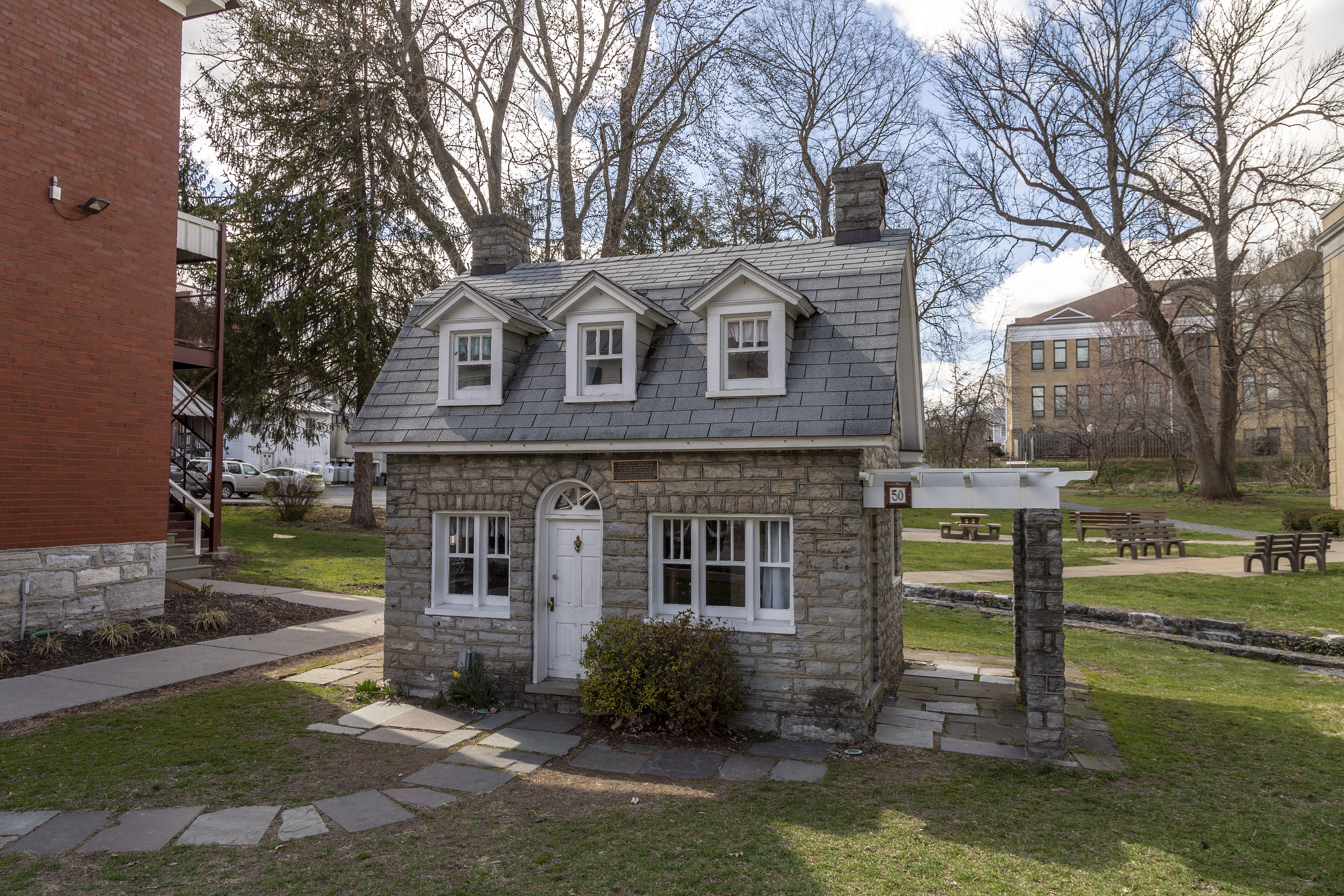
The Little House. The red building to the left is a regular two-story building

The Little House, also known as the Florence Shaw Demonstration Cottage, is a child-sized house in Shepherdstown, West Virginia. Built between 1928 and 1930, the 10-foot (3.0 m) tall Dutch Colonial house is part of a play complex conceived by Florence Shaw, supervisor of teacher training at Shepherd College. The stone walled, slate-roofed cottage measures 10 feet (3.0 m) long and 9.6 feet (2.9 m) deep. It is equipped with electric power and a working fireplace, and is fully furnished. The house is located on the edge of the Shepherd Campus along Town Run. The play complex includes a small barn on the other side of Town Run.

A plaque on the front of the house reads:

”This tablet was placed here by the friends of Florence Shaw to honor her for her services as professor of education at Shepherd College from 1923 to 1961. The erection of this Little House in 1929 was primarily due to her efforts.”
