= Family Affairs (1959 TV programme) =

British TV discussion programme

Family Affairs is a BBC television discussion programme that was broadcast from 1956.
