= A Family's Affairs =

1962 novel by Ellen Douglas

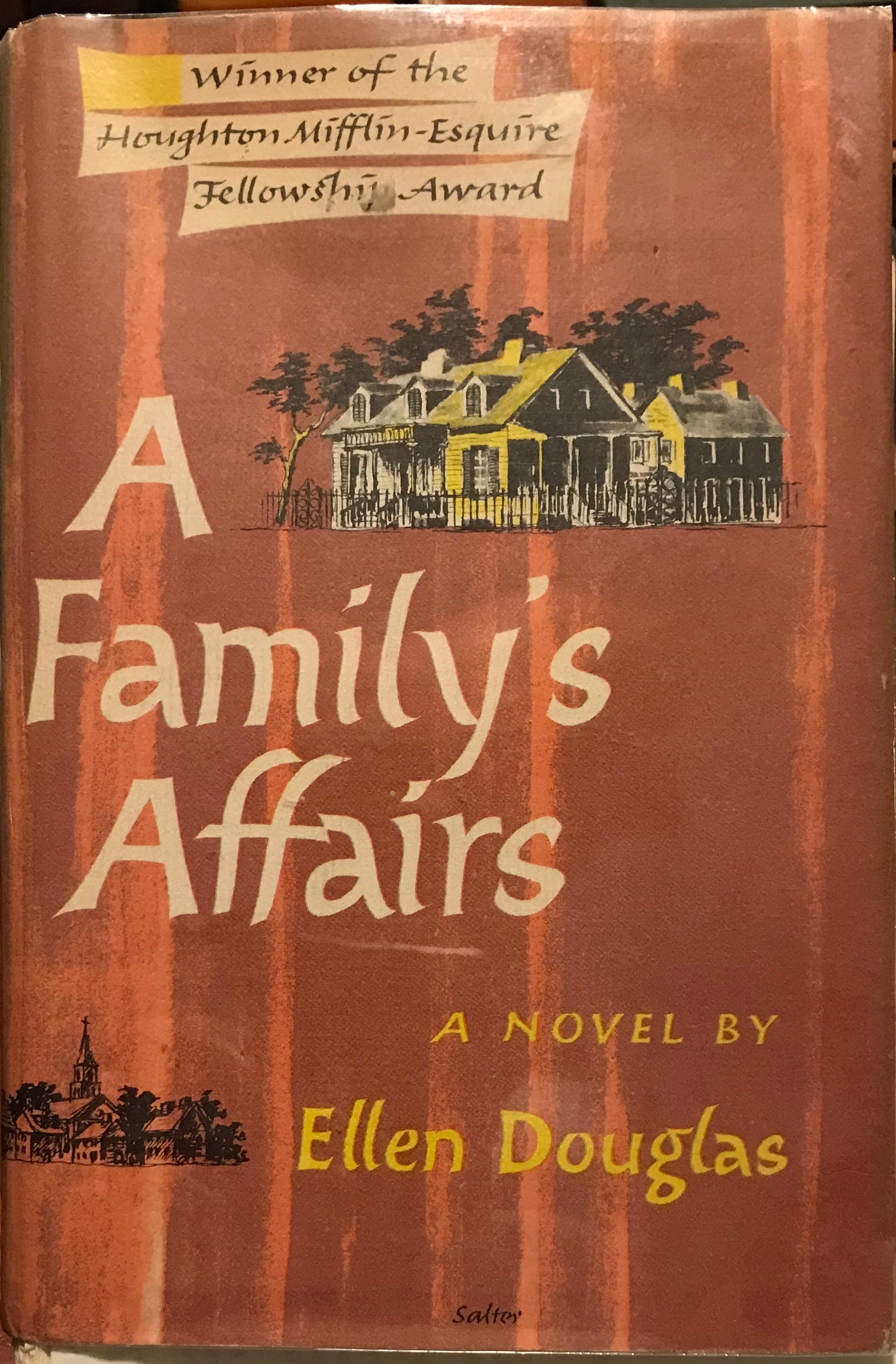
- First edition
- Author: Ellen Douglas
- Cover artist: George Salter
- Language: English
- Publisher: Houghton Mifflin
- Publication date: 11 June 1962
- Publication place: United States
- Media type: Print (hardback & paperback)
- Pages: 442 pp
- ISBN: 9780807121634
- OCLC: 1373389
- LC Class: PZ4.D7345 Fam FT MEADE
- Followed by: Black Cloud, White Cloud: Two Novellas and Two Stories

A Family's Affairs is a 1962 novel by Ellen Douglas.

This is Douglas' first novel. It tells the story of three generations of a Mississippi family, set in the fictional town of Homochitto. The novel was awarded the Houghton Mifflin fellowship in 1961 and was recognized as one of the five best novels of the year by The New York Times.
