= Family Affair (film) =

- Theatrical release poster
- Directed by: Chico Colvard
- Written by: Chico Colvard
- Produced by: Chico Colvard; Liz Garbus
- Cinematography: Chico Colvard
- Edited by: Rachel J. Clark
- Music by: Miriam Cutler
- Production company: C-LineFilms
- Release date: July 30, 2010
- Running time: 80 minutes
- Country: United States
- Language: English

Family Affair is a documentary film directed by Chico Colvard, exploring a history of abuse that had gone on inside his family, as a child. The movie was produced by Chico Colvard and Liz Garbus. It opened theatrically in Los Angeles on July 30, 2010 and opened in New York City on August 13, 2010 at the 14th Annual DocuWeeks. The film is a joint venture between OWN: Oprah Winfrey Network and Discovery Communications.
