= O'Connor House =

O'Connor House may refer to:

- James O'Connor Three-Decker, Worcester, Massachusetts, listed on the National Register of Historic Places (NRHP)
- James O'Connor-John Trybowski Three-Decker, Worcester, Massachusetts, NRHP-listed
- Cornelius O'Connor House, Homer, Nebraska, NRHP-listed
- O'Connor House (St. Thomas, North Dakota), NRHP-listed
- Barden-O'Connor House, Victoria, Texas, NRHP-listed
- Thomas M. O'Connor House, Victoria, Texas, NRHP-listed

== See also ==
- O'Connor Building (disambiguation)
