= O'Connor Building =

O'Connor Building may refer to:

- Sandra Day O'Connor United States Courthouse, also known as Sandra Day O'Connor Federal Building, Phoenix, Arizona
- J.S. O'Connor American Rich Cut Glassware Factory, Hawley, Pennsylvania
- Morrison Block, also known as M. O'Connor Grocery Wholesalers, Indianapolis, Indiana
- O'Connor-Proctor Building, Victoria, Texas

== See also ==
- O'Connor House (disambiguation)
