= Bettin =

Bettin' is a shortening for betting. Notable people with the surname Bettin or de Bettin include:

- Gianfranco Bettin (born 1955), Italian politician
- Giorgio de Bettin (born 1972), Italian ice hockey player
- Grietje Staffelt (née Bettin, born 1975), German politician
- Luigi de Bettin (fl. 1960s), Italian bobsleigh competitor
- Joël Bettin (born 1959), French canoeist
- Mauro Bettin (born 1968), Italian cyclist
- Max Bettin (fl. 1908), American Jew leader known for the Max Bettin House
- Val Bettin (1923–2021), American actor
