= Presbyterian Iglesia Nicea =

Historic church in Texas, United States

- U.S. National Register of Historic Places
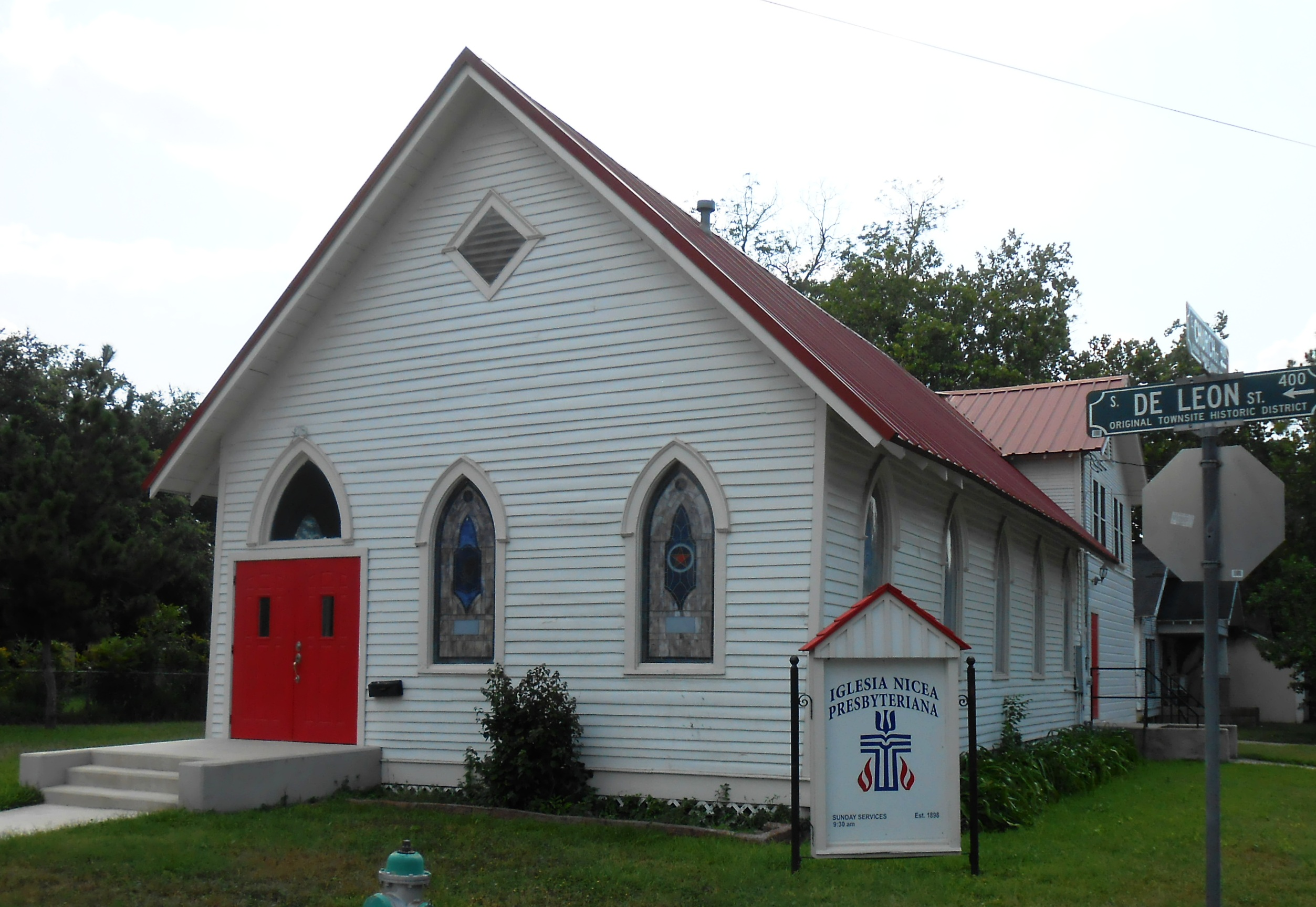
- Iglesia Nicea in 2014

- Location within Texas Location within the United States
- Location: 401 S. DeLeon, Victoria, Texas
- Coordinates: 28°47′43″N 97°0′16″W
- Area: less than one acre
- Built: 1910
- Architect: Jules Leffland
- Architectural style: Late Gothic Revival
- MPS: Victoria MRA
- NRHP reference No.: 86002571
- Added to NRHP: October 28, 1992

The Presbyterian Iglesia Nicea is a Hispanic Presbyterian church at 401 S. DeLeon in Victoria, Texas. It was designed by architect Jules Leffland. It was listed on the National Register of Historic Places in 1992.

Land for the church was donated by Mrs. John M. Brownson, wife of the founder of Victoria National Bank. It is a one-story wood-frame church that was built in 1910. In 1934 the building was moved to allow for addition of a Sunday School hall and a fellowship hall.

It was listed on the NRHP as part of a study which listed numerous historic resources in the Victoria area.

== See also ==
- National Register of Historic Places listings in Victoria County, Texas
