= George H. Hauschild Building =

- U.S. National Register of Historic Places
- Recorded Texas Historic Landmark
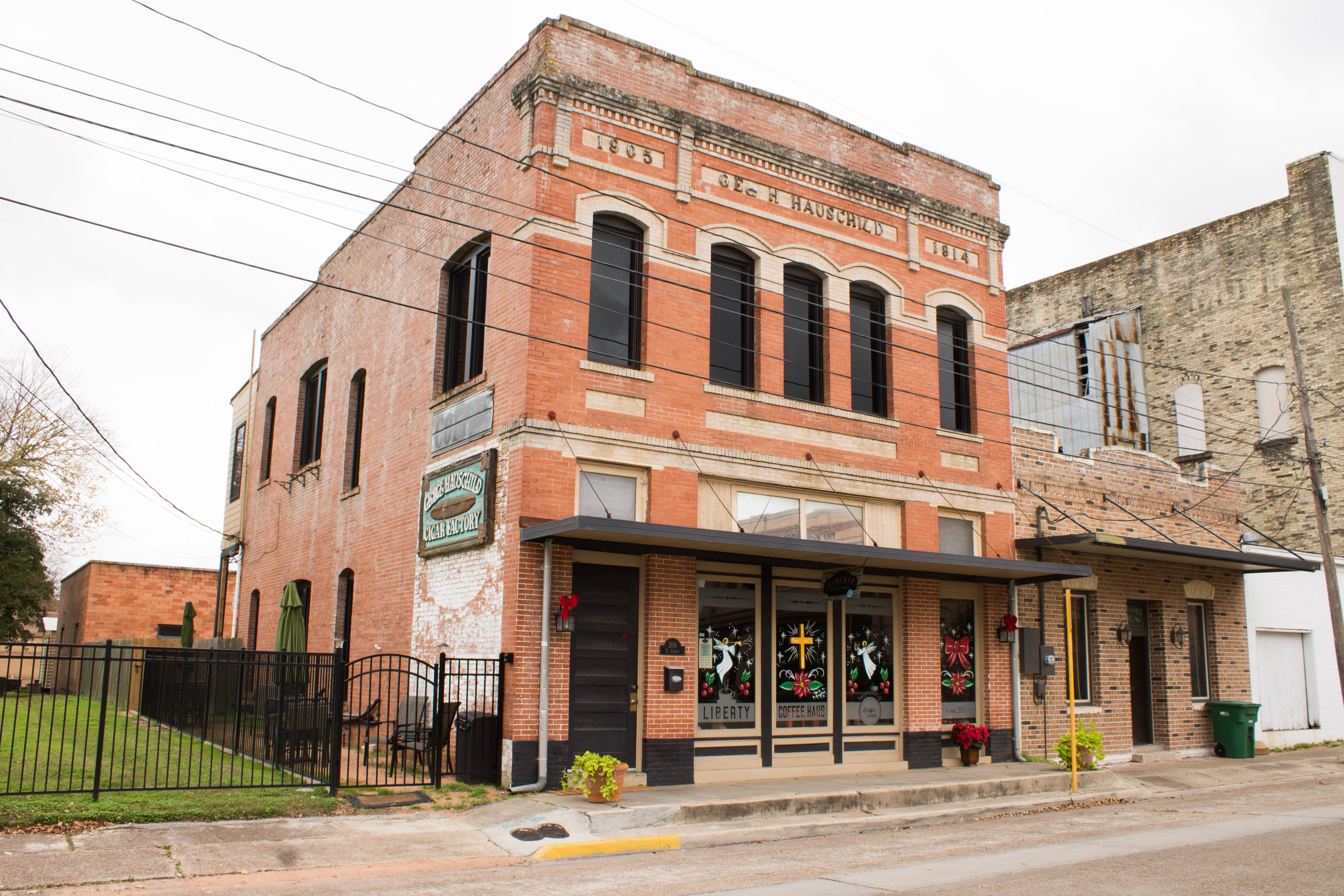
- Hauschild Building in 2015

- Location within Texas Location within the United States
- Location: 206 N. Liberty, Victoria, Texas
- Coordinates: 28°47′59″N 97°0′15″W
- Area: less than one acre
- Built: 1914
- Built by: Eugene Tuttle
- Architect: Jules Leffland
- MPS: Victoria MRA
- NRHP reference No.: 86002530
- RTHL No.: 14524

Significant dates
- Added to NRHP: December 9, 1986
- Designated RTHL: 1990

The George H. Hauschild Building at 206 N. Liberty in Victoria, Texas was built in 1914. It was designed by architect Jules Leffland and built by Eugene Tuttle.

It was listed on the National Register of Historic Places (NRHP) in 1986.

It is a two-story brick building that was built for George H. Hauschild's cigar manufacturing firm, with a dwelling unit above. Hauschild operated a ranch in the Victoria area.

It was listed on the NRHP as part of a study which listed numerous historic resources in the Victoria area.

== See also ==
- National Register of Historic Places listings in Victoria County, Texas
- Recorded Texas Historic Landmarks in Victoria County
