= Pickering House (Victoria, Texas) =

Historic house in Texas, United States

- U.S. National Register of Historic Places
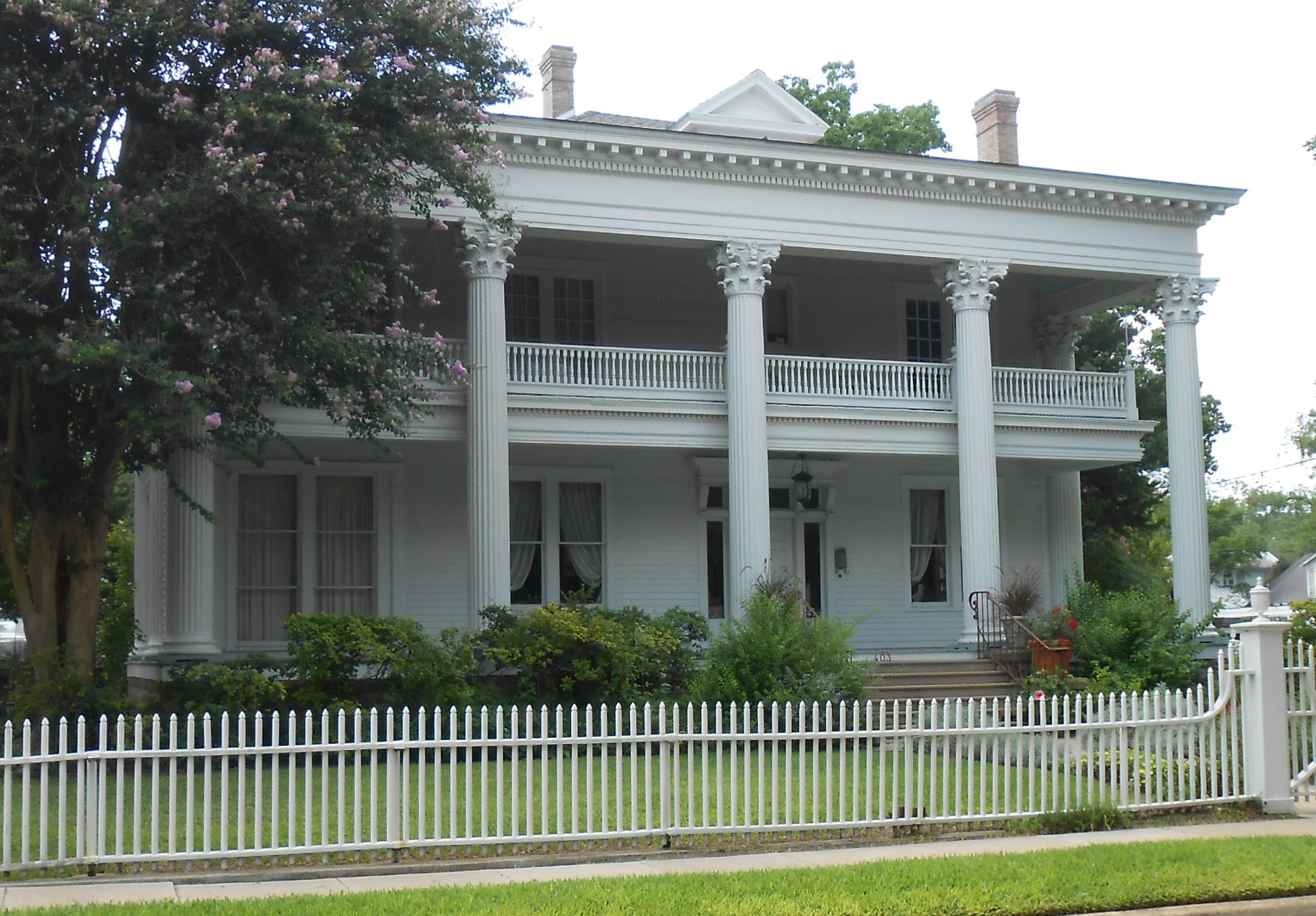
- Pickering House in 2014

- Location within Texas Location within the United States
- Location: 403 N. Glass, Victoria, Texas
- Coordinates: 28°48′10″N 97°0′24″W
- Area: less than one acre
- Built: 1855
- Architect: Jules Leffland
- Architectural style: Classical Revival
- MPS: Victoria MRA
- NRHP reference No.: 86002553
- Added to NRHP: December 9, 1986

The Pickering House, at 403 N. Glass in Victoria, Texas, was built c.1850s. In about 1911 it was remodelled to a Classical Revival design by architect Jules Leffland.

It was listed on the National Register of Historic Places in 1986 for its architecture. The listing included four contributing buildings.

The house has an asymmetrical plan and a two-story porch across its front. The original house was built for sea captain A. F. Higgs, entrepreneur of the Texas Continental Meat Co., possibly in the 1850s. Joe M. Pickering, a businessman and co-founder of the Anchor Lumber Co., bought the house in 1908.

It was listed on the NRHP as part of a study which listed numerous historic resources in the Victoria area.

== See also ==
- National Register of Historic Places listings in Victoria County, Texas
