= J. T. Jecker House =

Historic house in Texas, United States

- U.S. National Register of Historic Places
- Recorded Texas Historic Landmark
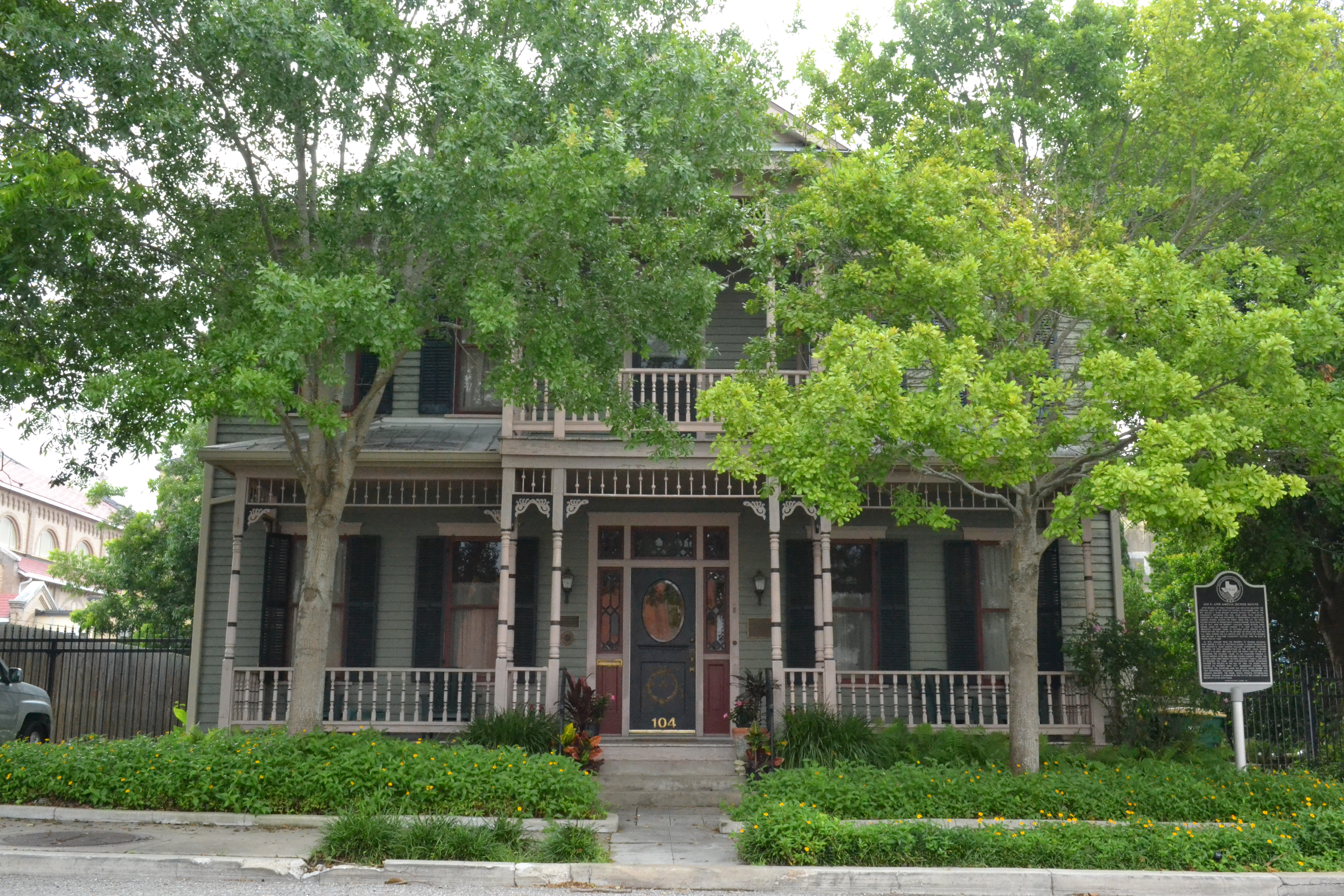
- J. T. Jecker House in 2016

- Location within Texas Location within the United States
- Location: 104 N. Liberty, Victoria, Texas
- Coordinates: 28°48′1″N 97°6′24″W
- Area: less than one acre
- Built: 1870
- Architect: Jules Leffland
- Architectural style: Late Victorian
- MPS: Victoria MRA
- NRHP reference No.: 86002531
- RTHL No.: 13496

Significant dates
- Added to NRHP: March 24, 1987
- Designated RTHL: 2005

The J. T. Jecker House at 104 N. Liberty in Victoria, Texas, United States, was built in 1870. It was designed by architect Jules Leffland in Late Victorian architecture. It was listed on the National Register of Historic Places (NRHP) in 1987.

It is a two-story wood-frame house with a two-story three-bay porch on the five-bay front of the building. The original house, built c.1870, is believed to have been the home of Dr. James B.P. January, who served as physician for Sam Houston's army during the Texas Revolution. In 1904 it was renovated for Joe T. Jecker, then the owner, to designs by architect Jules Leffland. In 1983 it appeared much as it did in 1904.

It was listed on the NRHP as part of a study which listed numerous historic resources in the Victoria area.

== See also ==
- National Register of Historic Places listings in Victoria County, Texas
- Recorded Texas Historic Landmarks in Victoria County
