= William Wheeler House (Victoria, Texas) =

Historic house in Texas, United States

- U.S. National Register of Historic Places
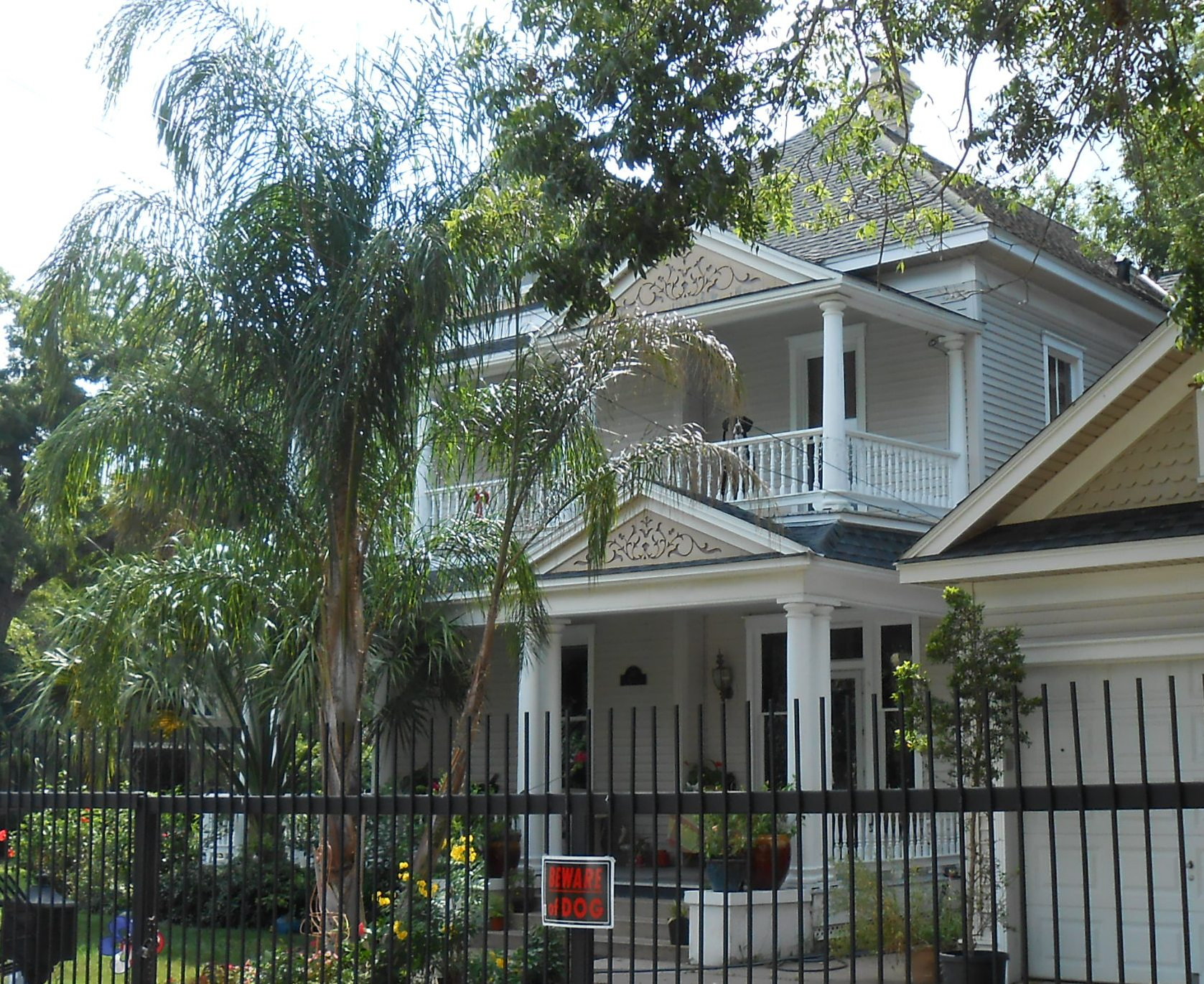
- Wheeler House in 2014

- Location within Texas Location within the United States
- Location: 303 N. William St., Victoria, Texas
- Coordinates: 28°48′2″N 97°0′12″W
- Area: less than one acre
- Built: 1900
- Architect: Jules Leffland
- Architectural style: Classical Revival
- MPS: Victoria MRA
- NRHP reference No.: 86002599
- Added to NRHP: December 9, 1986

The William Wheeler House in Victoria, Texas, was built in 1900. It was designed by the architect Jules Leffland in Classical Revival style for English immigrant William Wheeler and his family: Emma Hauschlld Wheeler and six children. It was listed on the U.S. National Register of Historic Places in 1986.

It has a wrap-around porch. It has wood siding scored to look like stone.

William Wheeler "assisted in designing water systems in St. Charles, Missouri and Palestine, Tyler and Columbus, Texas before coming to oversee the construction of Victoria's water system in 1884. Wheeler served as superintendent of the Victoria Water Department from 1885 to 1922. He also began a plumbing business that his son and grandson continued until 1965."

The house was occupied by the Wheeler family until 1982.

It was listed on the NRHP as part of a study which listed numerous historic resources in the Victoria area.

== See also ==
- National Register of Historic Places listings in Victoria County, Texas
