= Theodore Buhler House =

Historic house in Texas, United States

- U.S. National Register of Historic Places
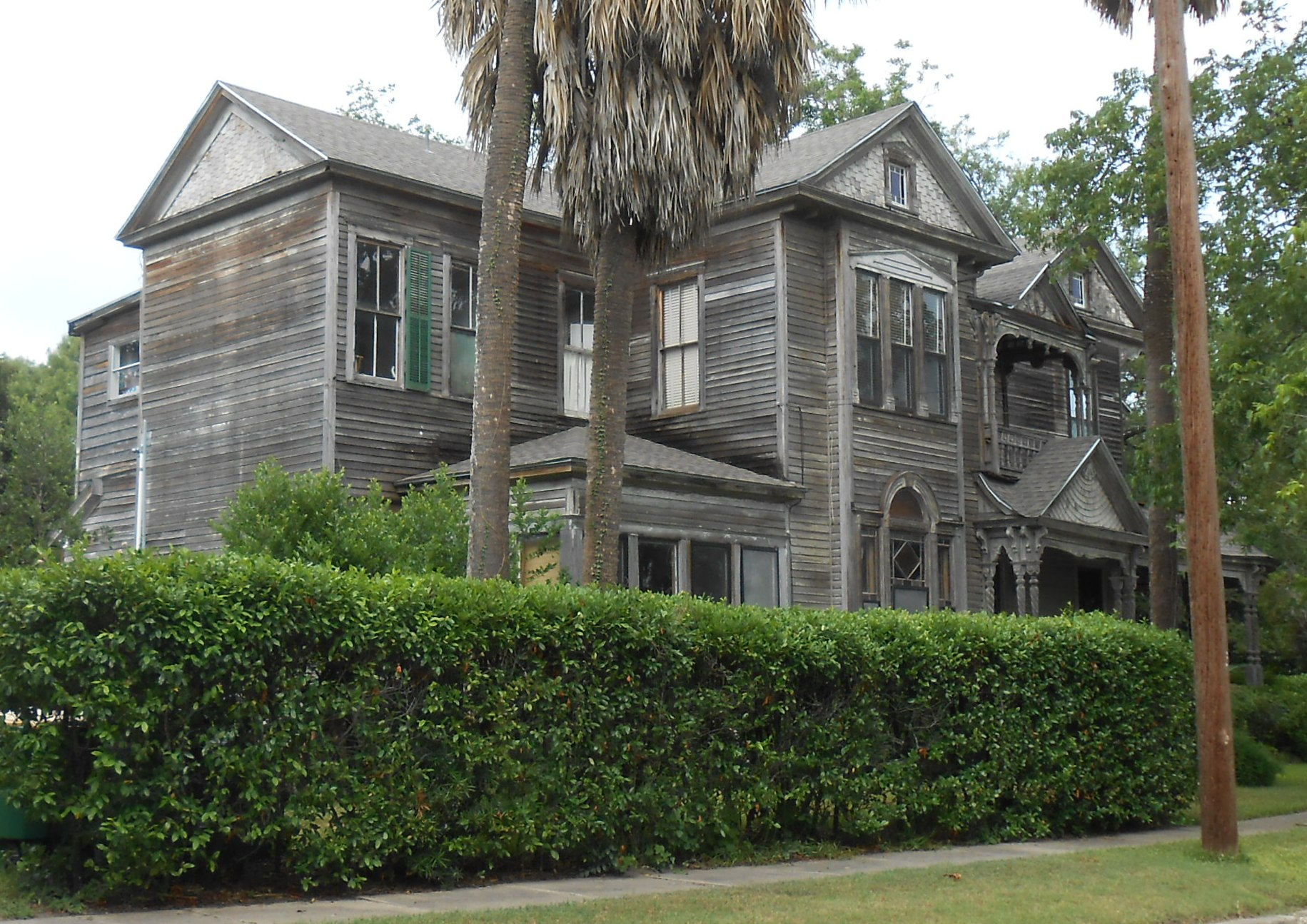
- The house in 2014

- Location within Texas Location within the United States
- Location: 202 West Stayton, Victoria, Texas
- Coordinates: 28°48′13″N 97°00′23″W
- Area: less than one acre
- Built: 1890
- Architectural style: Late Victorian
- MPS: Victoria MRA
- NRHP reference No.: 86002594
- Added to NRHP: December 9, 1986

The Theodore Buhler House is a historic house in Victoria, Texas. It was built in 1890 for Theodore Buhler and his wife, Katherine Schmidt. Born in Baden, Germany, he emigrated to the United States at a young age and grew up in New Orleans, Louisiana. During the American Civil War, he worked for Cook's foundry in New Orleans, which made firearms for the Confederate States Army. In the postbellum era, he worked for the railroads and steamships in Louisiana and Texas, and he co-founded the First National Bank of Victoria, the Victoria Loan Company, and the Victoria Building and Loan Company. He died in 1912.

The house was designed by Danish-born architect Jules Leffland in the Queen Anne architectural style. It has been listed on the National Register of Historic Places since December 9, 1986.
