= Trinity Lutheran Church (Victoria, Texas) =

Historic church in Texas, United States

- U.S. National Register of Historic Places
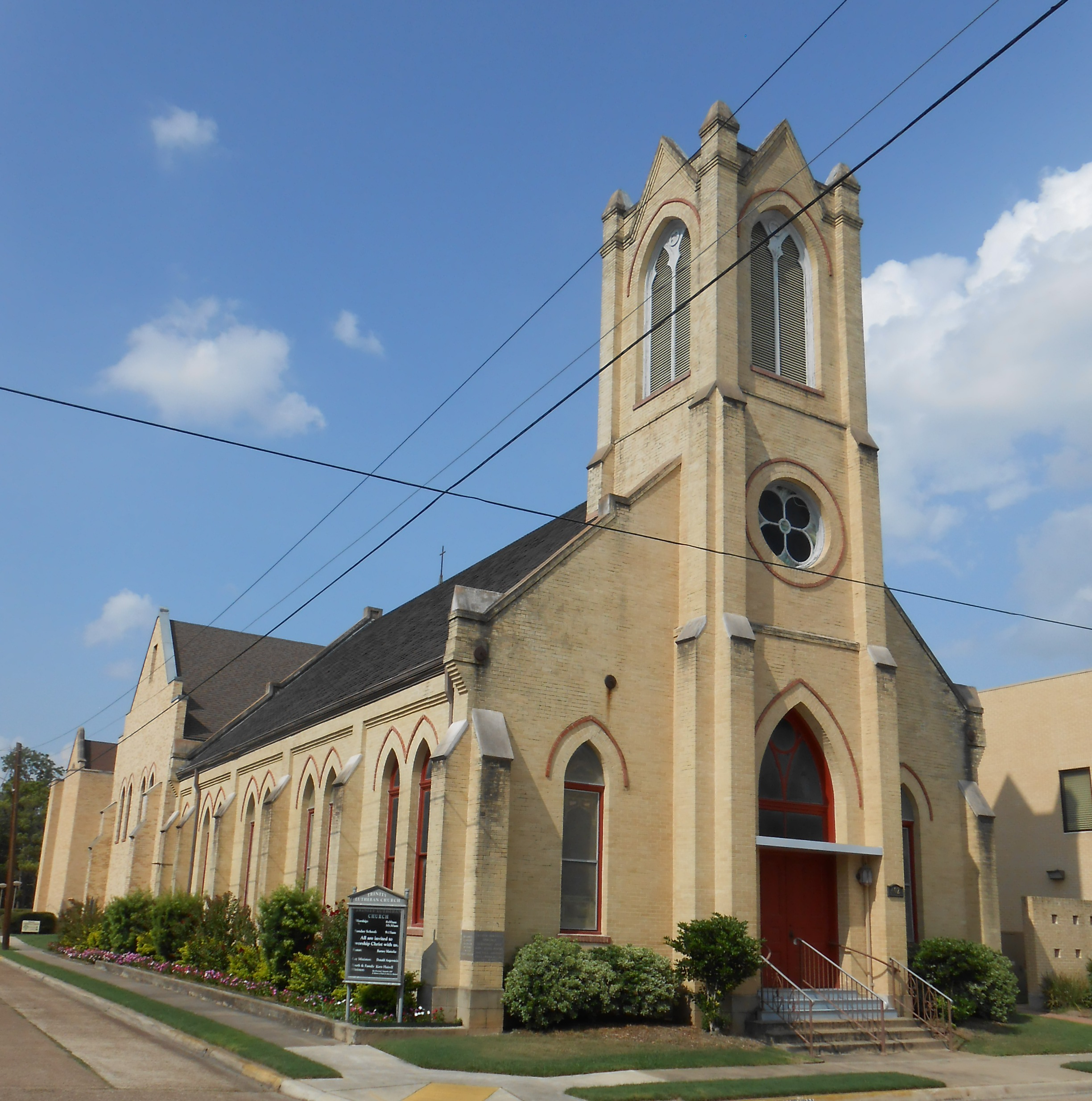
- Trinity Church in 2014

- Location within Texas Location within the United States
- Location: 402 E. Constitution, Victoria, Texas
- Coordinates: 28°47′53″N 97°0′10″W
- Area: less than one acre
- Built: 1908
- Built by: Fred Urban
- Architect: James Hull
- Architectural style: Late Gothic Revival
- MPS: Victoria MRA
- NRHP reference No.: 86002486
- Added to NRHP: December 9, 1986

Trinity Lutheran Church is a historic church at 402 E. Constitution in Victoria, Texas.

The corner stone was laid September 10, 1908. On May 2, 1909, Rev. Karl Weiss dedicated the church. In 1986 it was added to the National Register.

== See also ==
- National Register of Historic Places listings in Victoria County, Texas
