= Jules Leffland =

American architect

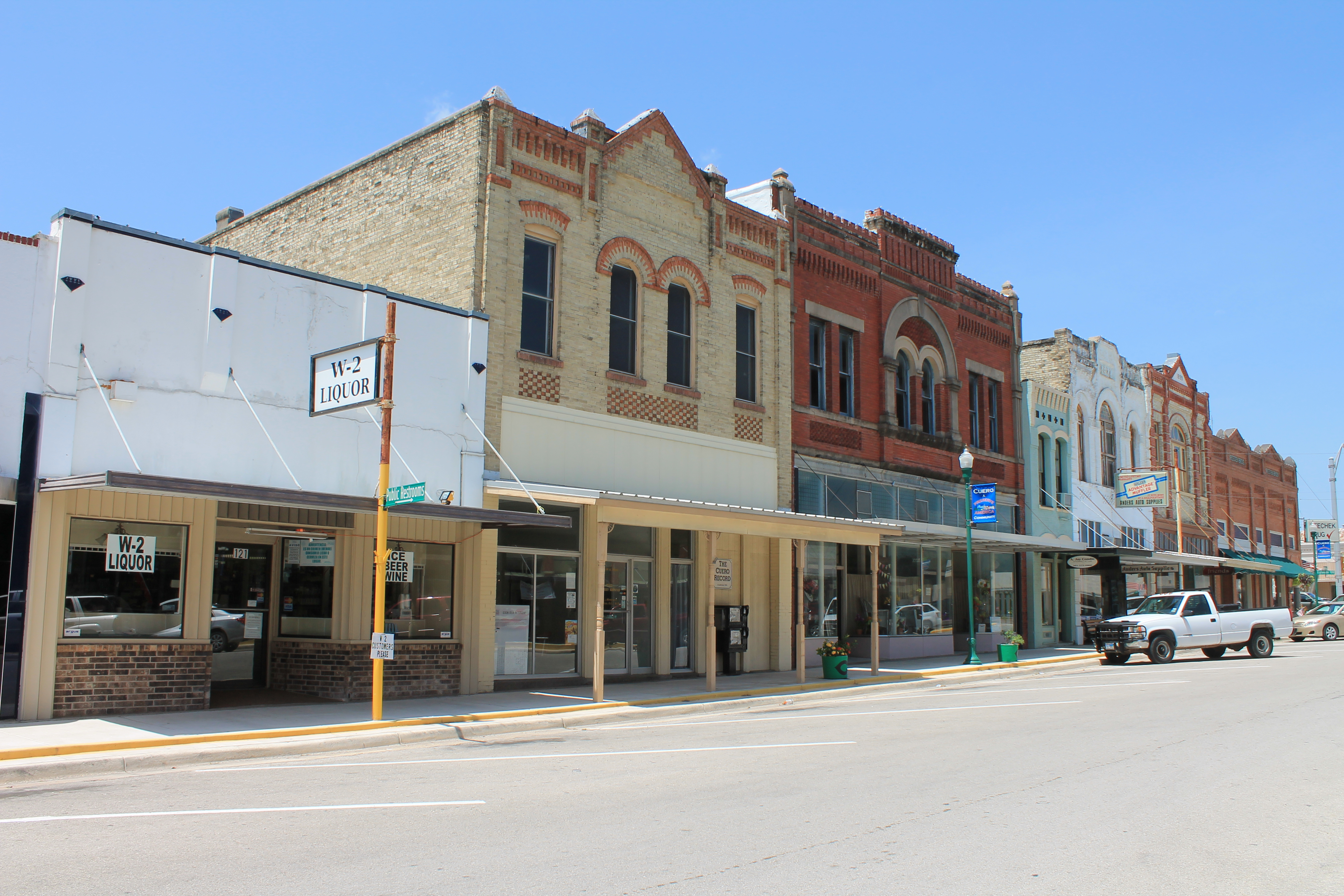
Cuero Commercial Historic District

Julius Carl "Jules" Leffland (September 9, 1854 – October 21, 1924) was a Danish-born architect known for his work in Victoria, Texas, and throughout South Texas. He was active in South Texas from approximately 1886 until the 1910s. Many of his works are listed on the National Register of Historic Places.

== Biography ==
Leffland was born in Usserød, Denmark in 1854 and studied architecture at the Institute of Technology in Copenhagen. His grandfather and father were architects in Denmark. He was married in 1879 to Emilie Sophie Struck, and they had eight children. After beginning his career as an architect in Denmark, Leffland emigrated to the United States in 1886. By the end of 1886, he had relocated to Victoria, Texas. He became one of the most prolific and respected architects in Victoria. Leffland also designed numerous buildings in Cuero, Texas and was its "most active architect". As his reputation grew, Leffland received commissions throughout South Texas, including Wharton, Beeville, Kingsville, and San Diego, Texas. According to one account, "Leffland was well-versed in a variety of stylistic expressions, although the Neoclassical Revival mode seems to be not only his most successful style but his personal favorite as well." By 1910, he had reportedly designed at least 80 structures, including churches, banks, city halls, hotels and residences across South Texas. Many of his works are listed on the U.S. National Register of Historic Places. Leffland died in October 1924 in Victoria County, Texas. His son Kai Leffland also was an architect and carried on Leffland's practice after his death.

== Retrospectives ==
In 1999, an exhibition at The Nave Museum in Victoria featuring Leffland's architectural drawings was opened under the title, "Architectural Drawings or Jules Carl Leffland." In 2005, the Matagorda County Museum opened an exhibit featuring "the life and legacy of building designer Jules Leffland."

== Works ==
Leffland's works include:

- Max Bettin House, 602 E. Santa Rosa, Victoria, Texas, NRHP-listed
- Theodore Buhler House, 202 West Stayton, Victoria, Texas, NRHP-listed
- Breeden-Runge Wholesale Grocery Company Building, 108 N. Frederick William, Cuero, Texas, NRHP-listed
- Burger-Robertson Block (1909–1919), 115-137 S. Fulton Street, Wharton, Texas. Three of its six commercial buildings were designed by Leffland. It is a contributing building in the NRHP-listed Wharton County Courthouse Historic Commercial District.
- Burrough-Daniel House, 502 W. North, Victoria, Texas, NRHP-listed
- Dr. L.W. and Martha E.S. Chilton House, 242 N. Chilton St., Goliad, Texas, NRHP-listed
- George H. Hauschild Building, 206 N. Liberty, Victoria, Texas, NRHP-listed
- J. T. Jecker House, 104 N. Liberty, Victoria, Texas, NRHP-listed
- Jules Leffland House, 302 E. Convent, Victoria, Texas, NRHP-listed
- Mrs. J. V. Murphy House, 204 E. Santa Rosa, Victoria, Texas, NRHP-listed
- Old Nazareth Academy (1904), 105 W. Church, Victoria, Texas, NRHP-listed
- Pickering House, 403 N. Glass, Victoria, Texas, NRHP-listed
- Presbyterian Iglesia Nicea, 401 S. DeLeon, Victoria, Texas, NRHP-listed
- Proctor House, 507 N. Glass, Victoria, Texas, NRHP-listed
- John B. Ragland Mercantile Company Building, 201 E. Kleberg Ave., Kingsville, Texas, NRHP-listed
- D. H. Regan House, 507 S. DeLeon, Victoria, Texas, NRHP-listed
- J. V. Vandenberge House, 301 N. Vine, Victoria, Texas, NRHP-listed
- Victoria Colored School, 702 E. Convent, Victoria, Texas, NRHP-listed
- William Wheeler House, 303 N. William St., Victoria, Texas, NRHP-listed
- Multiple works in Cuero Commercial Historic District, roughly bounded by Gonzales, Main, Terrell and Courthouse, Cuero, Texas, NRHP-listed
- One or more works in Terrell-Reuss Streets Historic District, 300 to 900 blocks of Terrell, 500 to 900 blocks of Indianola, and 200 blk. of W. Reuss to 400 blk. of E. Reuss, Cuero, Texas, NRHP-listed
