= National Register of Historic Places listings in Victoria County, Texas =

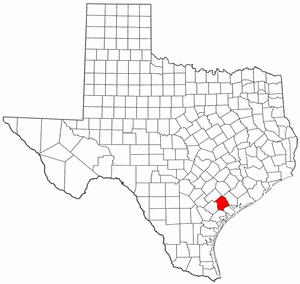
Location of Victoria County in Texas

This is a list of the National Register of Historic Places listings in Victoria County, Texas.

This is intended to be a complete list of properties and districts listed on the National Register of Historic Places in Victoria County, Texas. There are one district and 114 individual properties listed on the National Register in the county. An additional property has since been delisted. Two properties are designated State Antiquities Landmarks while 26 are Recorded Texas Historic Landmarks.

This National Park Service list is complete through NPS recent listings posted September 26, 2025.

== Current listings ==
The publicly disclosed locations of National Register properties and districts may be seen in a mapping service provided.

	Name on the Register	Image	Date listed	Location	City or town	Description
1	C. R. Alden Building	C. R. Alden Building	December 9, 1986 (#86002533)	106-110 W. Juan Linn; 28°47′52″N 97°00′26″W	Victoria	
2	Frank Alonso House	Frank Alonso House	December 9, 1986 (#86002585)	401 S. Cameron; 28°47′39″N 97°00′02″W	Victoria	
3	B'nai Israel	B'nai Israel	December 9, 1986 (#86002613)	604 N. Main; 28°48′13″N 97°00′14″W	Victoria	
4	Barden-O'Connor House	Barden-O'Connor House	December 9, 1986 (#86002609)	305 N. Moody; 28°48′09″N 97°00′30″W	Victoria	
5	W. C. Barnes House	W. C. Barnes House	December 9, 1986 (#86002568)	106 W. Stayton; 28°48′14″N 97°00′18″W	Victoria	
6	E. H. D. Bendt House	E. H. D. Bendt House	December 9, 1986 (#86002570)	407 S. DeLeon; 28°47′42″N 97°00′17″W	Victoria	
7	Bernhard Electric Building		January 25, 2024 (#100009882)	103-109 E. Goodwin Avenue; 28°48′02″N 97°00′17″W	Victoria	
8	Max Bettin House	Max Bettin House	December 9, 1986 (#86002564)	602 E. Santa Rosa; 28°47′48″N 97°00′05″W	Victoria	
9	Braman House	Braman House	December 9, 1986 (#86002593)	206 W. Stayton; 28°48′15″N 97°00′21″W	Victoria	
10	Theodore Buhler House	Theodore Buhler House	December 9, 1986 (#86002594)	202 W. Stayton; 28°48′14″N 97°00′19″W	Victoria	
11	Building at 205 East Constitution	Building at 205 East Constitution	December 9, 1986 (#86002475)	205 E. Constitution; 28°47′55″N 97°00′17″W	Victoria	
12	Burrough-Daniel House	Burrough-Daniel House	December 9, 1986 (#86002604)	502 W. North; 28°48′21″N 97°00′29″W	Victoria	
13	Calhoun Bakery		December 9, 1986 (#86002534)	209 N. Wheeler; 28°47′58″N 97°00′06″W	Victoria	Demolished
14	Callender House	Callender House	September 26, 1979 (#79003019)	404 W. Guadelupe St; 28°48′30″N 97°00′26″W	Victoria	Recorded Texas Historic Landmark
15	City of Victoria Pumping Plant-Waterworks	City of Victoria Pumping Plant-Waterworks	December 9, 1986 (#86002610)	105 W. Juan Linn; 28°48′22″N 97°00′58″W	Victoria	Recorded Texas Historic Landmark
16	Clark House	Clark House	December 9, 1986 (#86002507)	606 S. Liberty; 28°47′38″N 97°00′26″W	Victoria	
17	Robert Clark House	Robert Clark House	December 9, 1986 (#86002615)	317 N. Main; 28°48′06″N 97°00′19″W	Victoria	Recorded Texas Historic Landmark
18	John H. Clegg House	John H. Clegg House	December 9, 1986 (#86002548)	507 N. Vine; 28°48′17″N 97°00′30″W	Victoria	
19	F. H. Crain House	F. H. Crain House	December 9, 1986 (#86002549)	307 N. Vine; 28°48′11″N 97°00′33″W	Victoria	
20	DeLeon Plaza and Bandstand	DeLeon Plaza and Bandstand	March 24, 1987 (#86002584)	100 blk. W. Constitution; 28°47′59″N 97°00′23″W	Victoria	Recorded Texas Historic Landmark
21	Diebel-Hyak House	Diebel-Hyak House	December 12, 1986 (#86002484)	501 S. Cameron; 28°47′36″N 97°00′03″W	Victoria	
22	Farmers and Merchants Cotton Gin Warehouse	Farmers and Merchants Cotton Gin Warehouse	December 9, 1986 (#86002561)	402 S. East; 28°47′38″N 96°59′58″W	Victoria	
23	Fleming-Welder House	Fleming-Welder House	December 9, 1986 (#86002581)	607 N. Craig; 28°48′22″N 97°00′36″W	Victoria	Recorded Texas Historic Landmark
24	Fort St. Louis Site	Fort St. Louis Site	March 31, 1971 (#71000969)	Address restricted	Inez	
25	Fossati's	Fossati's	May 20, 1991 (#91000578)	302 S. Main; 28°47′50″N 97°00′24″W	Victoria	Recorded Texas Historic Landmark
26	E. J. Fossati House		December 9, 1986 (#86002563)	607 S. DeLeon; 28°47′36″N 97°00′20″W	Victoria	
27	Jacob Fox House	Jacob Fox House	December 9, 1986 (#86002596)	708 W. Power; 28°48′18″N 97°00′40″W	Victoria	Recorded Texas Historic Landmark
28	Gaylord-Levy House	Gaylord-Levy House	December 9, 1986 (#86002589)	402 N. Bridge; 28°48′08″N 97°00′21″W	Victoria	
29	Gervais House	Gervais House	July 5, 1990 (#90001052)	507 W. Forrest; 28°48′05″N 97°00′37″W	Victoria	
30	Goldman's Cotton Gin Warehouse	Goldman's Cotton Gin Warehouse	December 9, 1986 (#86002606)	901 E. Murray; 28°47′32″N 97°00′00″W	Victoria	
31	A. Goldman Building	A. Goldman Building	December 9, 1986 (#86002499)	207 E. Constitution; 28°47′55″N 97°00′17″W	Victoria	
32	Gramann House	Gramann House	December 9, 1986 (#86002542)	302 E. Goodwin; 28°48′01″N 97°00′11″W	Victoria	
33	George and Adele Hauschild House		December 9, 1986 (#86002510)	208 N. Liberty; 28°48′01″N 97°00′16″W	Victoria	Demolished
34	George H. Hauschild Building	George H. Hauschild Building	December 9, 1986 (#86002530)	206 N. Liberty; 28°48′01″N 97°00′17″W	Victoria	Recorded Texas Historic Landmark
35	Hill-Howard House	Hill-Howard House	December 9, 1986 (#86002558)	802 W. Power; 28°48′18″N 97°00′42″W	Victoria	Recorded Texas Historic Landmark
36	Hiller House	Hiller House	December 9, 1986 (#86002482)	3003 N. Vine; 28°49′18″N 97°00′33″W	Victoria	Recorded Texas Historic Landmark
37	Hiller House	Hiller House	December 9, 1986 (#86002459)	501 E. Church; 28°47′42″N 97°00′12″W	Victoria	
38	House at 304 West Stayton	House at 304 West Stayton	December 9, 1986 (#86002591)	304 W. Stayton; 28°48′16″N 97°00′24″W	Victoria	
39	House at 306 East Forrest	House at 306 East Forrest	December 9, 1986 (#86002557)	306 E. Forrest; 28°47′56″N 97°00′08″W	Victoria	
40	House at 401 East Stayton	House at 401 East Stayton	December 9, 1986 (#86002572)	401 E. Stayton; 28°48′08″N 97°00′03″W	Victoria	
41	House at 402 W. Colorado	House at 402 W. Colorado	May 20, 1991 (#91000576)	402 W. Colorado; 28°48′33″N 97°00′27″W	Victoria	
42	House at 407 East Convent	House at 407 East Convent	December 9, 1986 (#86002583)	407 E. Convent; 28°47′39″N 97°00′14″W	Victoria	
43	House at 4402 East Juan Linn	House at 4402 East Juan Linn	December 9, 1986 (#86002535)	4402 E. Juan Linn; 28°47′01″N 96°57′51″W	Victoria	
44	House at 604 East Santa Rosa	House at 604 East Santa Rosa	December 9, 1986 (#86002562)	604 E. Santa Rosa; 28°47′48″N 97°00′04″W	Victoria	
45	House at 702 Siegfried	House at 702 Siegfried	December 9, 1986 (#86002577)	702 Siegfried; 28°47′31″N 97°00′58″W	Victoria	
46	House at 706 Siegfried		December 9, 1986 (#86002576)	706 Siegfried; 28°47′31″N 97°00′59″W	Victoria	Demolished between 2011 and 2013
47	House at 804 Siegfried	House at 804 Siegfried	December 9, 1986 (#86002574)	804 Siegfried; 28°47′30″N 97°01′04″W	Victoria	
48	House at 1602 North Moody	House at 1602 North Moody	December 9, 1986 (#86002608)	1602 N. Moody; 28°48′33″N 97°00′26″W	Victoria	
49	House at 1907 Southwest Ben Jordan	House at 1907 Southwest Ben Jordan	December 9, 1986 (#86002590)	1907 S.W. Ben Jordan; 28°47′14″N 96°59′19″W	Victoria	
50	Hull House	Hull House	December 9, 1986 (#86002543)	1002 NE Water; 28°47′28″N 96°59′58″W	Victoria	
51	E. J. Jecker House	E. J. Jecker House	December 9, 1986 (#86002539)	201 N. Wheeler; 28°47′56″N 97°00′07″W	Victoria	
52	J. T. Jecker House	J. T. Jecker House	March 24, 1987 (#86002531)	104 N. Liberty; 28°47′57″N 97°00′18″W	Victoria	Recorded Texas Historic Landmark
53	Jordan-Koch House	Jordan-Koch House	December 9, 1986 (#86002579)	307 N. DeLeon; 28°48′02″N 97°00′08″W	Victoria	
54	E. C. Kaufman House	E. C. Kaufman House	December 9, 1986 (#86002567)	502 S. DeLeon; 28°47′40″N 97°00′17″W	Victoria	
55	Keef-Filley Building	Keef-Filley Building	March 24, 1987 (#86002612)	214 S. Main; 28°47′52″N 97°00′24″W	Victoria	
56	Lander-Hopkins House	Lander-Hopkins House	December 9, 1986 (#86002600)	202 W. Power at N. Bridge; 28°48′11″N 97°00′21″W	Victoria	
57	Lane-Tarkington House	Lane-Tarkington House	December 9, 1986 (#86002617)	1207 N. Bridge; 28°48′22″N 97°00′17″W	Victoria	
58	Lawrence House	Lawrence House	December 9, 1986 (#86002588)	1203 N. Bridge; 28°48′21″N 97°00′17″W	Victoria	
59	Jules Leffland House	Jules Leffland House	May 20, 1991 (#91000577)	302 E. Convent; 28°47′43″N 97°00′19″W	Victoria	
60	Levi-Welder House	Levi-Welder House	December 9, 1986 (#86002614)	403 N. Main; 28°48′09″N 97°00′18″W	Victoria	Recorded Texas Historic Landmark
61	Little House	Little House	December 9, 1986 (#86002551)	502 N. Victoria; 28°48′16″N 97°00′33″W	Victoria	
62	Vera Martin-Fiek-Thumford House	Vera Martin-Fiek-Thumford House	December 9, 1986 (#86002597)	507 N. William; 28°48′10″N 97°00′09″W	Victoria	
63	McCabe Building	McCabe Building	December 19, 1986 (#86002464)	508 N. Wheeler; 28°48′07″N 97°00′01″W	Victoria	Demolished in October, 2013.
64	McCan-Nave House	McCan-Nave House	December 9, 1986 (#86002555)	401 N. Glass; 28°48′09″N 97°00′25″W	Victoria	
65	McDonald House	McDonald House	December 9, 1986 (#86002460)	406 E. Constitution; 28°47′53″N 97°00′09″W	Victoria	
66	James McFaddin House	James McFaddin House	March 24, 1987 (#86002506)	207 W. Commercial; 28°48′08″N 97°00′25″W	Victoria	Recorded Texas Historic Landmark
67	McNamara-O'Conner House	McNamara-O'Conner House	December 9, 1986 (#86002509)	502 N. Liberty; 28°48′09″N 97°00′12″W	Victoria	Recorded Texas Historic Landmark
68	Mission Creek Dam and Acequia Site	Mission Creek Dam and Acequia Site	April 9, 1980 (#80004157)	Address restricted	Victoria	
69	Guy Mitchell House	Guy Mitchell House	December 9, 1986 (#86002541)	402 W. Goodwin; 28°48′07″N 97°00′31″W	Victoria	
70	Moeller House		December 9, 1986 (#86002559)	901 S. East; 28°47′22″N 97°00′05″W	Victoria	Demolished
71	Mohris-Abschier House	Mohris-Abschier House	December 9, 1986 (#86002580)	101 N. DeLeon; 28°47′54″N 97°00′12″W	Victoria	
72	Mrs. J. V. Murphy House	Mrs. J. V. Murphy House	December 9, 1986 (#86002554)	204 E. Santa Rosa; 28°47′53″N 97°00′18″W	Victoria	
73	Royston Nave Memorial	Royston Nave Memorial	December 9, 1986 (#86002502)	306 W. Commercial; 28°48′10″N 97°00′28″W	Victoria	
74	Thomas M. O'Connor House	Thomas M. O'Connor House	December 9, 1986 (#86002587)	303 S. Bridge; 28°47′51″N 97°00′30″W	Victoria	
75	O'Connor-Proctor Building	O'Connor-Proctor Building	December 9, 1986 (#86002546)	202 N. Main; 28°48′00″N 97°00′20″W	Victoria	Recorded Texas Historic Landmark
76	Old Brownson School	Old Brownson School	December 9, 1986 (#86002598)	500 blk. of W. Power; 28°48′14″N 97°00′33″W	Victoria	
77	Old Federal Building and Post Office	Old Federal Building and Post Office	December 9, 1986 (#86002493)	210 E. Constitution; 28°47′55″N 97°00′15″W	Victoria	Recorded Texas Historic Landmark
78	Old Municipal Assembly Hall		December 9, 1986 (#86002603)	800 E. Pine; 28°48′12″N 96°59′45″W	Victoria	Demolished
79	Old Nazareth Academy	Old Nazareth Academy	December 9, 1986 (#86002462)	105 W. Church; 28°47′48″N 97°00′28″W	Victoria	
80	Old Victoria County Courthouse	Old Victoria County Courthouse	August 18, 1977 (#77001479)	101 N. Bridge St. 28°47′59″N 97°00′26″W	Victoria	State Antiquities Landmark, Recorded Texas Historic Landmark
81	Our Lady of Lourdes Church	Our Lady of Lourdes Church	December 9, 1986 (#86002601)	105 N. William; 28°47′57″N 97°00′14″W	Victoria	
82	Pela House	Pela House	December 9, 1986 (#86002552)	309 E. Santa Rosa; 28°47′50″N 97°00′14″W	Victoria	Recorded Texas Historic Landmark
83	Judge Alexander H. Phillips House	Judge Alexander H. Phillips House	November 3, 1983 (#83003824)	705 N. Craig St. 28°48′25″N 97°00′36″W	Victoria	Recorded Texas Historic Landmark
84	Pickering House	Pickering House	December 9, 1986 (#86002553)	403 N. Glass; 28°48′11″N 97°00′25″W	Victoria	
85	Pippert House		December 9, 1986 (#86002578)	207 E. Third; 28°47′30″N 97°00′28″W	Victoria	Demolished
86	Presbyterian Iglesia Nicea	Presbyterian Iglesia Nicea	October 28, 1992 (#86002571)	401 S. DeLeon; 28°47′44″N 97°00′16″W	Victoria	
87	Proctor House	Proctor House	December 6, 1986 (#86002544)	507 N. Glass; 28°48′14″N 97°00′23″W	Victoria	Recorded Texas Historic Landmark
88	Proctor-Vandenberge House	Proctor-Vandenberge House	December 9, 1986 (#86002575)	604 N. Craig; 28°48′22″N 97°00′36″W	Victoria	Recorded Texas Historic Landmark
89	Randall Building	Randall Building	December 9, 1986 (#86002560)	103-105 W. Santa Rosa; 28°47′54″N 97°00′25″W	Victoria	
90	D. H. Regan House	D. H. Regan House	December 9, 1986 (#86002565)	507 S. DeLeon; 28°47′39″N 97°00′18″W	Victoria	Recorded Texas Historic Landmark
91	Roselle-Smith House	Roselle-Smith House	July 5, 1990 (#90001050)	301 E. Commercial; 28°48′03″N 97°00′11″W	Victoria	
92	Saint Mary's Catholic Church	Saint Mary's Catholic Church	December 9, 1986 (#86002450)	101 W. Church; 28°47′48″N 97°00′27″W	Victoria	Recorded Texas Historic Landmark
93	Schroeder House	Schroeder House	December 9, 1986 (#86002545)	1507 N. Vine; 28°48′32″N 97°00′30″W	Victoria	
94	Schummacker Company Building	Schummacker Company Building	December 9, 1986 (#86002602)	402 E. Power; 28°48′06″N 97°00′05″W	Victoria	State Antiquities Landmark
95	Alphonse T. Sengele House	Alphonse T. Sengele House	October 28, 1992 (#86002538)	502 E. Juan Linn; 28°47′46″N 97°00′10″W	Victoria	
96	Henry Shrader House	Henry Shrader House	December 9, 1986 (#86002483)	607 S. Cameron; 28°47′31″N 97°00′06″W	Victoria	
97	Sigmund House	Sigmund House	December 9, 1986 (#86002566)	508 E. Santa Rosa; 28°47′49″N 97°00′06″W	Victoria	
98	South Bridge Street Historic District	South Bridge Street Historic District	September 24, 1986 (#86002592)	W side 700 blk. of S. Bridge and N side 200 blk. of W. Water Sts. 28°47′37″N 97°00′35″W	Victoria	
99	Stuart House	Stuart House	December 9, 1986 (#86002586)	506 S. Bridge; 28°47′44″N 97°00′31″W	Victoria	
100	Tasin House	Tasin House	December 9, 1986 (#86002536)	202 N. Wheeler; 28°47′56″N 97°00′06″W	Victoria	
101	Texas Company Filling Station		December 9, 1986 (#86002595)	102 S. Williams St. 28°47′54″N 97°00′15″W	Victoria	Demolished
102	Tonkawa Bank Site	Tonkawa Bank Site	February 13, 1981 (#81000634)	Address restricted	Victoria	41 VT 10
103	Townsend-Wilkins House	Townsend-Wilkins House	December 9, 1986 (#86002605)	106 N. Navarro; 28°47′53″N 97°00′03″W	Victoria	
104	Trinity Lutheran Church	Trinity Lutheran Church	December 9, 1986 (#86002486)	402 E. Constitution; 28°47′53″N 97°00′10″W	Victoria	
105	Fred Urban House	Fred Urban House	October 28, 1992 (#86002556)	501 E. River; 28°47′33″N 97°00′15″W	Victoria	
106	J. V. Vandenberge House	J. V. Vandenberge House	December 9, 1986 (#86002550)	301 N. Vine; 28°48′09″N 97°00′34″W	Victoria	
107	Victoria Colored School	Victoria Colored School	December 9, 1986 (#86002582)	702 E. Convent; 28°47′38″N 97°00′05″W	Victoria	
108	Victoria County Monument	Victoria County Monument	July 27, 2018 (#100002760)	402 N DeLeon St., Memorial Square Park; 28°48′05″N 97°00′05″W	Victoria	
109	Victoria Grist Windmill	Victoria Grist Windmill	April 30, 1976 (#76002079)	Memorial Park in Victoria; 28°48′03″N 97°00′05″W	Victoria	Recorded Texas Historic Landmark
110	Weber-Schuchert House	Weber-Schuchert House	December 9, 1986 (#86002490)	302 E. Constitution; 28°47′55″N 97°00′14″W	Victoria	
111	Webster Chapel United Methodist Church	Webster Chapel United Methodist Church	December 9, 1986 (#86002478)	405 S. Wheeler; 28°47′41″N 97°00′13″W	Victoria	
112	Robert H. Welder House	Robert H. Welder House	March 12, 1999 (#86003843)	210 E. Juan Linn; 28°47′49″N 97°00′18″W	Victoria	
113	William Wheeler House	William Wheeler House	December 9, 1986 (#86002599)	303 N. William St. 28°48′02″N 97°00′12″W	Victoria	
114	Willeke Site	Willeke Site	November 20, 1978 (#78002997)	Address restricted	Victoria	41VT16
115	B. F. Williams House	B. F. Williams House	December 9, 1986 (#86002607)	401 E. Murray; 28°47′37″N 97°00′18″W	Victoria	Recorded Texas Historic Landmark
116	Woodhouse House	Woodhouse House	December 9, 1986 (#86002481)	609 N. Wheeler; 28°48′11″N 97°00′01″W	Victoria	Recorded Texas Historic Landmark
117	Herman and Alvina Zahn House		December 9, 1986 (#86002573)	310 S. Wheeler St. 28°47′43″N 97°00′11″W	Victoria	Relocated in 2014.

== Former listing ==
	Name on the Register	Image	Date listed	Date removed	Location	City or town	Description
1	Krenek House		December 9, 1986 (#86002611)	July 19, 2010	607 N. Main; 28°48′15″N 97°00′14″W	Victoria	Demolished April 9–10, 2010.

== See also ==
- National Register of Historic Places listings in Texas
- Recorded Texas Historic Landmarks in Victoria County
