= Little House (Victoria, Texas) =

Historic house in Texas, United States

- U.S. National Register of Historic Places
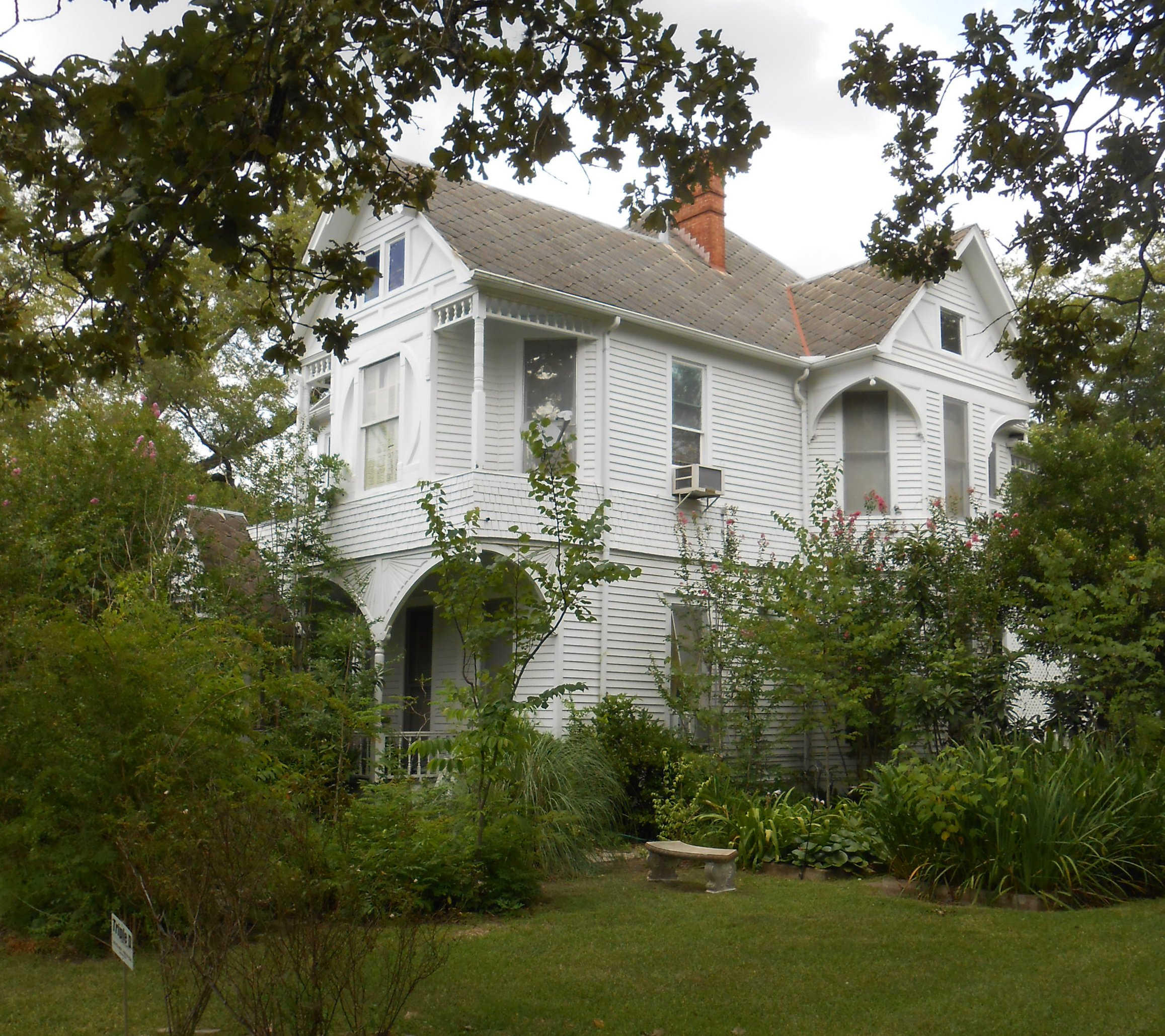
- Little House in 2014

- Location within Texas Location within the United States
- Location: 502 N. Victoria, Victoria, Texas
- Coordinates: 28°48′15″N 97°0′31″W
- Area: less than one acre
- Built: 1896
- Architectural style: Late Victorian
- MPS: Victoria MRA
- NRHP reference No.: 86002551
- Added to NRHP: December 9, 1986

Little House is a historic house in Victoria, Texas, that was built circa 1896. It was listed on the National Register of Historic Places in 1986. It was deemed to be an "exceptional local example of a Victorian-era residence". Its Victorian features include asymmetrical massing and an octagonal turret on its second floor. It was listed on the National Register as part of a group of historic Victoria resources.

The 2,880-square-foot (268 m^{2}) home was finished February 1896. Construction commenced after the death of Mr. John Little in 1895 and was the home of Henrietta Little and her daughters, Sarah, Margaret and Caroline. The home design was a George F. Barber model #33 of the Cottage Souvenir #2 book. The home design was modified to suit Mrs. Little and her girls. The home opened up into the foyer which boasted an elegant staircase, pocket doors leading to a study complete with fireplace, a dining room with a bay window and the sitting room adjacent the kitchen. The kitchen had a second set of stairs that opened into a small hallway upstairs connecting to two of the bedrooms and a serving room. The crowning feature of the home's design was the round picture window in the main bedroom that overlooked Victoria Street. During the home's 125 years, the building was moderately renovated with a porch being enclosed to use as a closet and the home's original roof covered with slate tiles. The home remained in the Little family until Caroline's death in 1953. The home was sold to Harry and Yetta Goltzman in 1953 and they lived in the home until the early 1960s when Oscar and Gladys Phillips purchased the home. The Phillips family lived in the home until their matriarch, Gladys, died in 2019. The home was purchased in January 2022 and was demolished by the new owner shortly after taking possession of the home.

== See also ==
- National Register of Historic Places listings in Victoria County, Texas
