= Victoria Grist Windmill =

- U.S. National Register of Historic Places
- Recorded Texas Historic Landmark
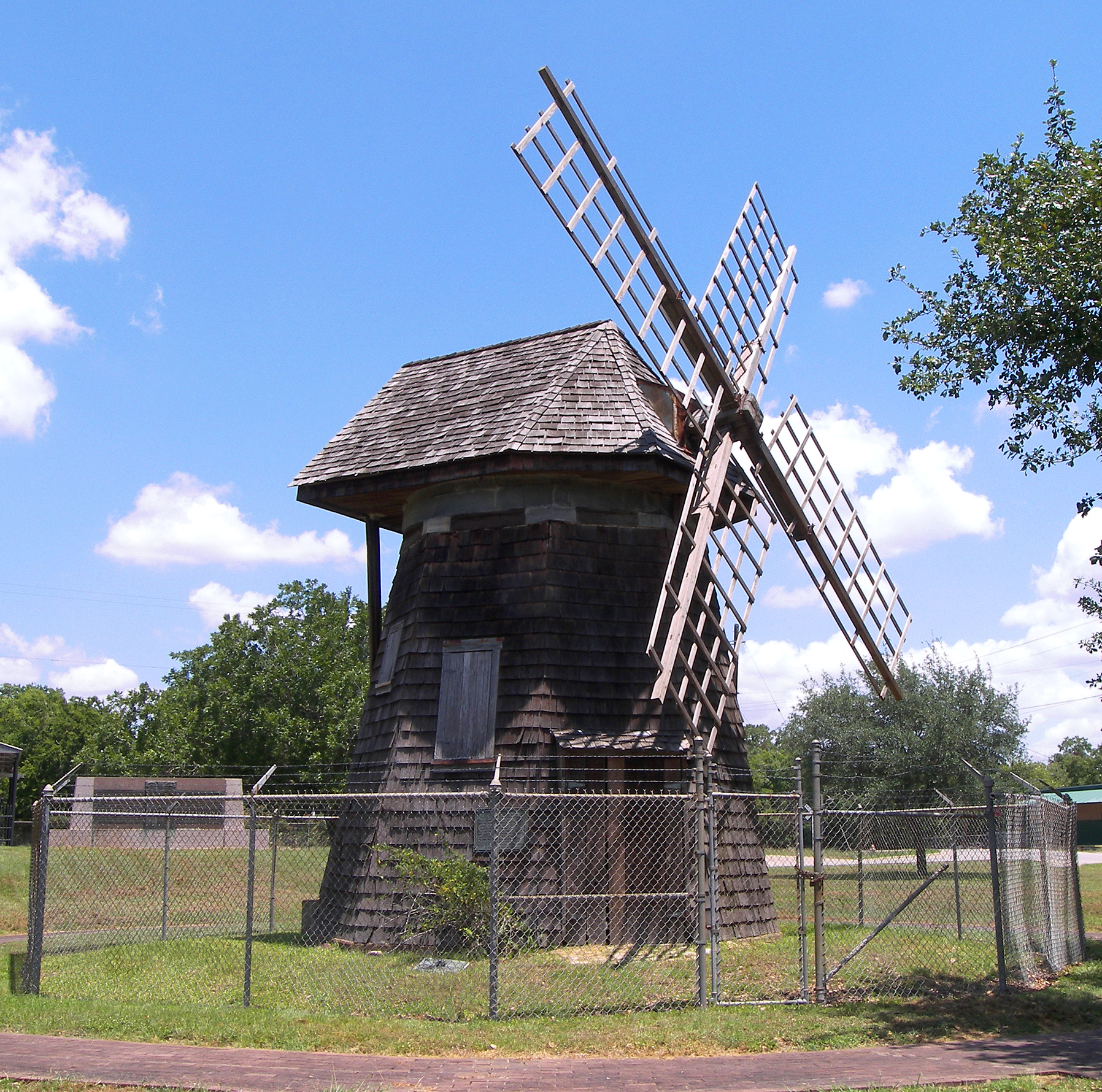
- Victoria Grist Windmill in 2008

- Location within Texas Location within the United States
- Location: Memorial Park in Victoria, Texas
- Coordinates: 28°48′1″N 97°0′0″W
- Area: 0.1 acres (0.040 ha)
- Built: 1870
- Built by: Otto Feik
- Architect: F.G. Wittke
- Architectural style: Tower-type windmill
- NRHP reference No.: 76002079
- RTHL No.: 14443

Significant dates
- Added to NRHP: April 30, 1976
- Designated RTHL: 1962

Victoria Grist Windmill is an historic gristmill in Memorial Square in Victoria, Texas, United States. The windmill was added to the National Register of Historic Places on April 30, 1976, and became an American Society of Mechanical Engineers Landmark in May 1991.

The windmill was built in 1870 and is probably the last remaining windmill of European design in the Southwestern United States. Standing 35 feet high and supporting four 15-foot blades, the Dutch turret-mill style windmill was constructed by German immigrant Fred Meiss, Jr. and Otto Fiek near Spring Creek. The turret-style allowed the top to be turned so the sails face the wind. The millstones were made in Germany, and Rudolph Witte brought them through the port of Indianola in the 1840s. The stones were capable of grinding 500 pounds of cornmeal a week. The walls of the mill are constructed of wooden logs and covered with shakes. In 1935, the Victoria Grist Windmill was moved from its earlier location (west of Victoria) to Memorial Square.

Due to neglect, the windmill was removed in the 1990s.

== See also ==
- National Register of Historic Places listings in Victoria County, Texas
- Recorded Texas Historic Landmarks in Victoria County
