= Webster Chapel United Methodist Church =

Historic church in Texas, United States

- U.S. National Register of Historic Places
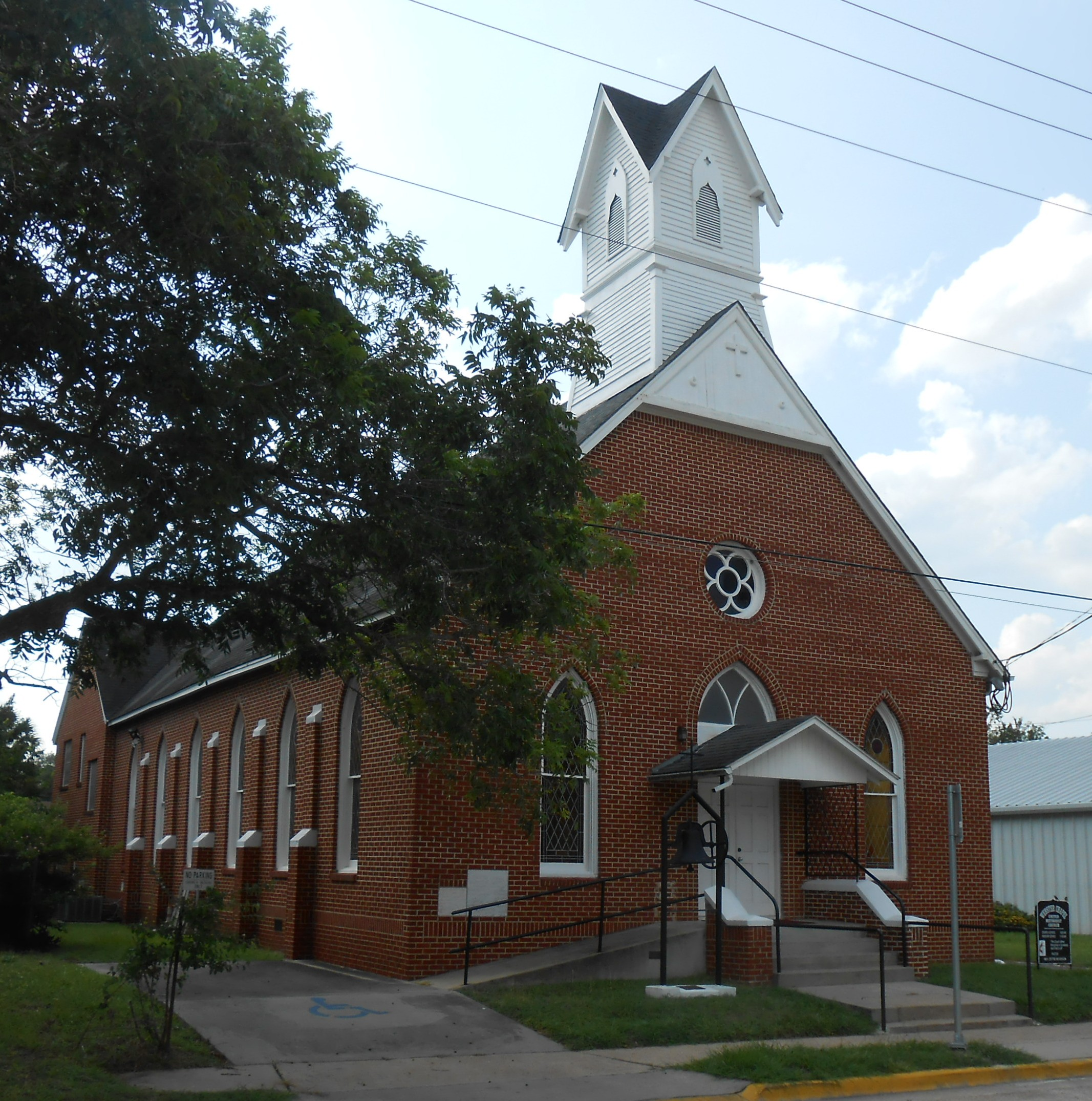
- Webster Chapel in 2014

- Location within Texas Location within the United States
- Location: 405 S. Wheeler, Victoria, Texas
- Coordinates: 28°47′40″N 97°0′13″W
- Area: less than one acre
- Built: 1889
- Architectural style: Gothic
- MPS: Victoria MRA
- NRHP reference No.: 86002478
- Added to NRHP: December 9, 1986

Webster Chapel United Methodist Church is a historic United Methodist church at 405 S. Wheeler in Victoria, Texas.

It was built in 1889 in a Gothic style and was added to the National Register in 1986.

== See also ==
- National Register of Historic Places listings in Victoria County, Texas
