= D. H. Regan House =

Historic house in Texas, United States

- U.S. National Register of Historic Places
- Recorded Texas Historic Landmark
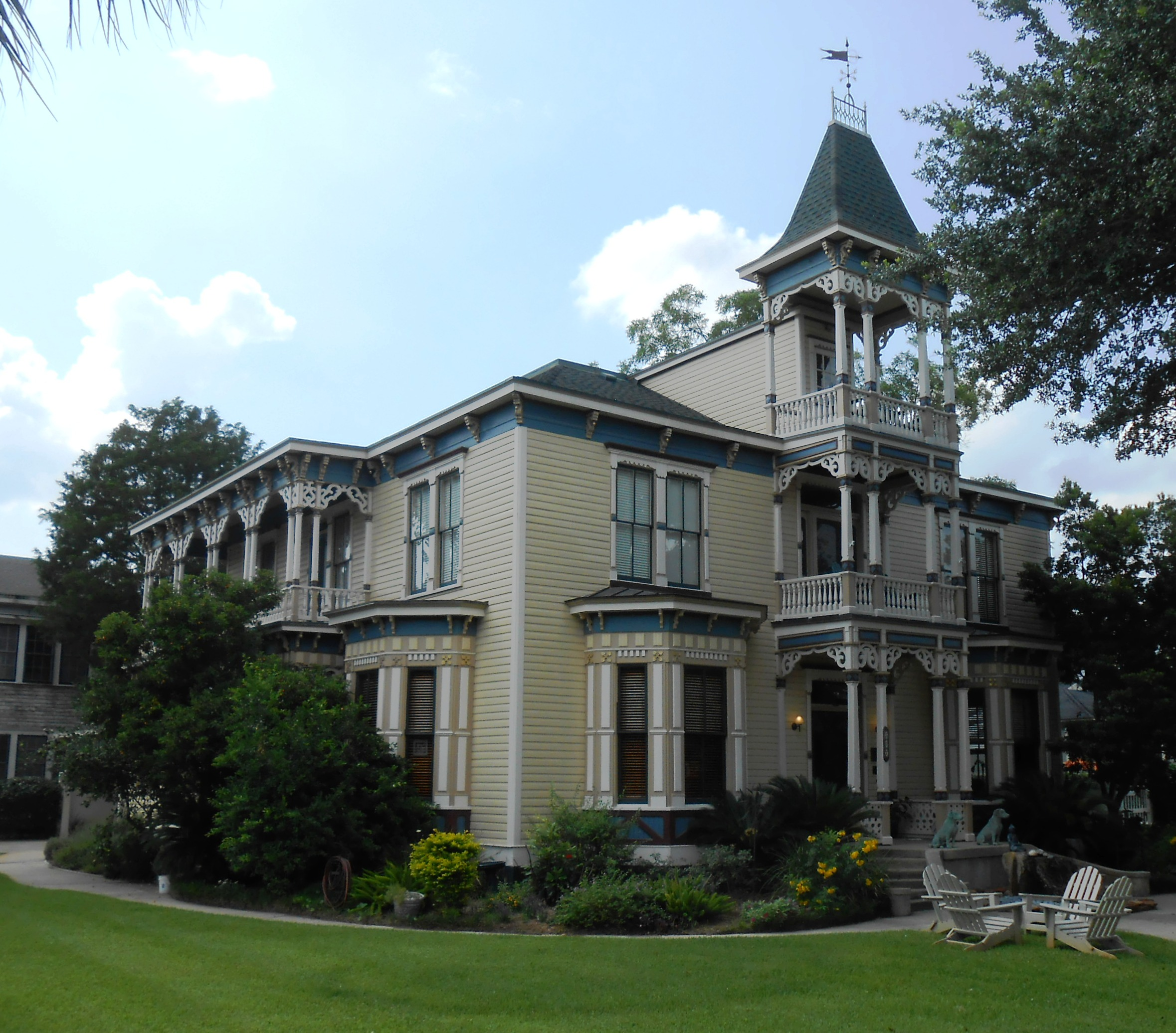
- Regan House in 2014

- Location within Texas Location within the United States
- Location: 507 S. DeLeon, Victoria, Texas
- Coordinates: 28°47′38″N 97°0′21″W
- Area: less than one acre
- Built: 1880
- Architect: Jules Leffland
- Architectural style: Italianate
- MPS: Victoria MRA
- NRHP reference No.: 86002565
- RTHL No.: 4234

Significant dates
- Added to NRHP: December 9, 1986
- Designated RTHL: 1996

The D. H. Regan House at 507 S. DeLeon in Victoria, Texas, United States, is an Italianate architecture home designed by architect Jules Leffland. It was built in 1880. It was listed on the National Register of Historic Places in 1986.

It was listed on the NRHP as part of a study which listed numerous historic resources in the Victoria area.

It is one of the "highly embellished, but rigidly symmetrical, houses built in the 1870s" that demonstrate a change from "mid-century classicism" in architecture in the Victoria area.

Like the Huck-Welder House, it is one of the homes and businesses that were moved after devastating storms hit the coastal community of Indianola, a port on the Matagorda Bay, in 1875 (the third storm in the 1875 hurricane season) and in 1886 (the devastating 1886 Indianola hurricane).

== See also ==
- National Register of Historic Places listings in Victoria County, Texas
- Recorded Texas Historic Landmarks in Victoria County
