= J. V. Vandenberge House =

Historic house in Texas, United States

- U.S. National Register of Historic Places
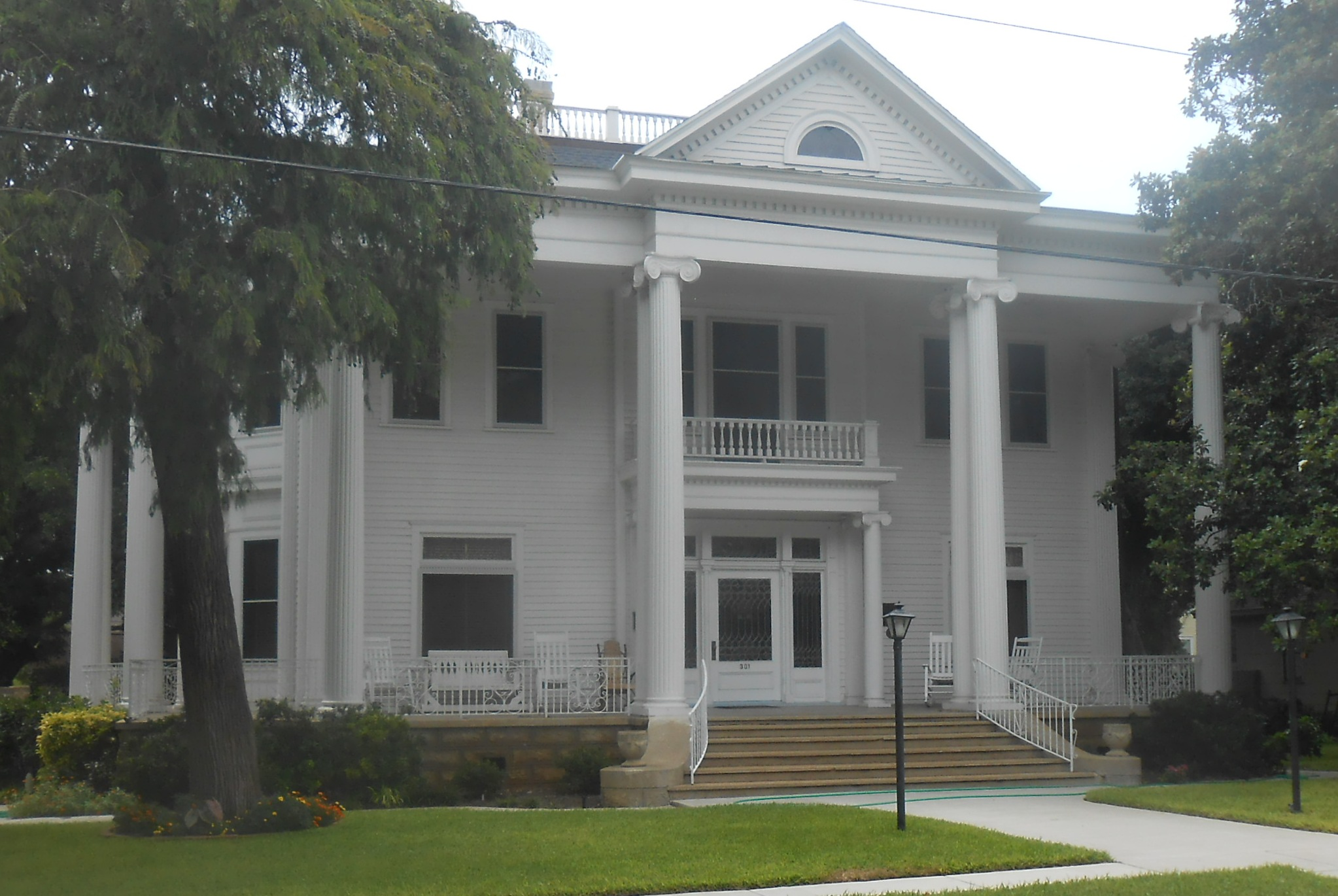
- Vandenberge House in 2014

- Location within Texas Location within the United States
- Location: 301 N. Vine, Victoria, Texas
- Coordinates: 28°48′7″N 97°0′33″W
- Area: less than one acre
- Built: 1908
- Architect: Jules Leffland
- Architectural style: Classical Revival
- MPS: Victoria MRA
- NRHP reference No.: 86002550
- Added to NRHP: December 9, 1986

The J. V. Vandenberge House at 301 N. Vine in Victoria, Texas, United States was built in 1908. It was a work of architect Jules Leffland. It was listed on the National Register of Historic Places in 1986.

It has been termed an "outstanding example" of Leffland's work.

== See also ==
- National Register of Historic Places listings in Victoria County, Texas
