= Burrough–Daniel House =

Historic house in Texas, United States

- U.S. National Register of Historic Places
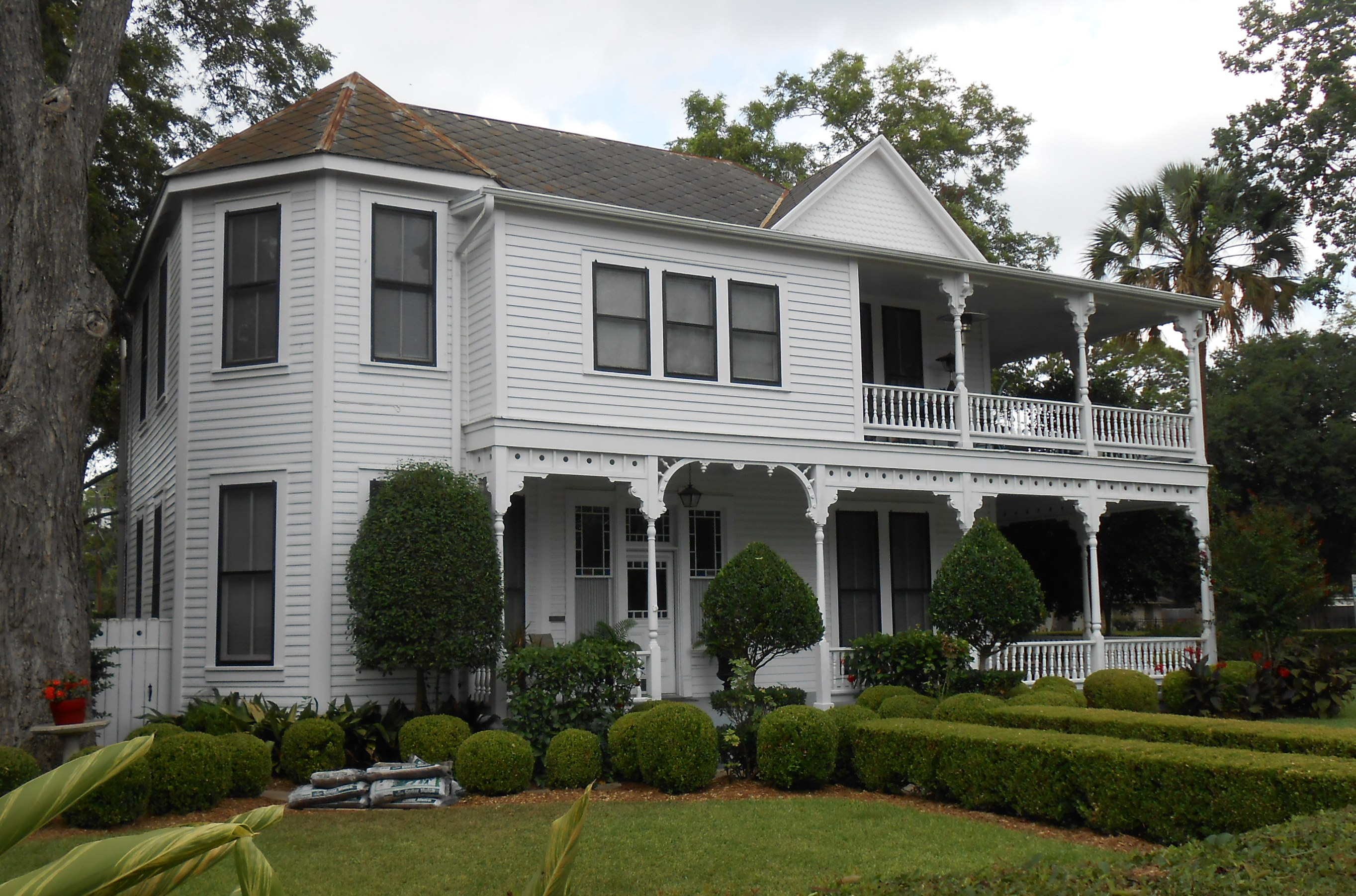
- Burrough–Daniel House in 2014

- Location within Texas Location within the United States
- Location: 502 W. North, Victoria, Texas
- Coordinates: 28°48′21″N 97°0′28″W
- Area: less than one acre
- Built: 1892
- Built by: Nathan S. Gilbert
- Architect: Jules Leffland
- Architectural style: Late Victorian
- MPS: Victoria MRA
- NRHP reference No.: 86002604
- Added to NRHP: December 9, 1986

The Burrough–Daniel House at 502 W. North in Victoria, Texas was built in 1892. It was designed by architect Jules Leffland in Late Victorian architecture. It was listed on the National Register of Historic Places in 1986.

Leffland designed many buildings in Victoria.

== See also ==
- National Register of Historic Places listings in Victoria County, Texas
