= McCabe Building (Victoria, Texas) =

Historic house in Texas, United States

- U.S. National Register of Historic Places
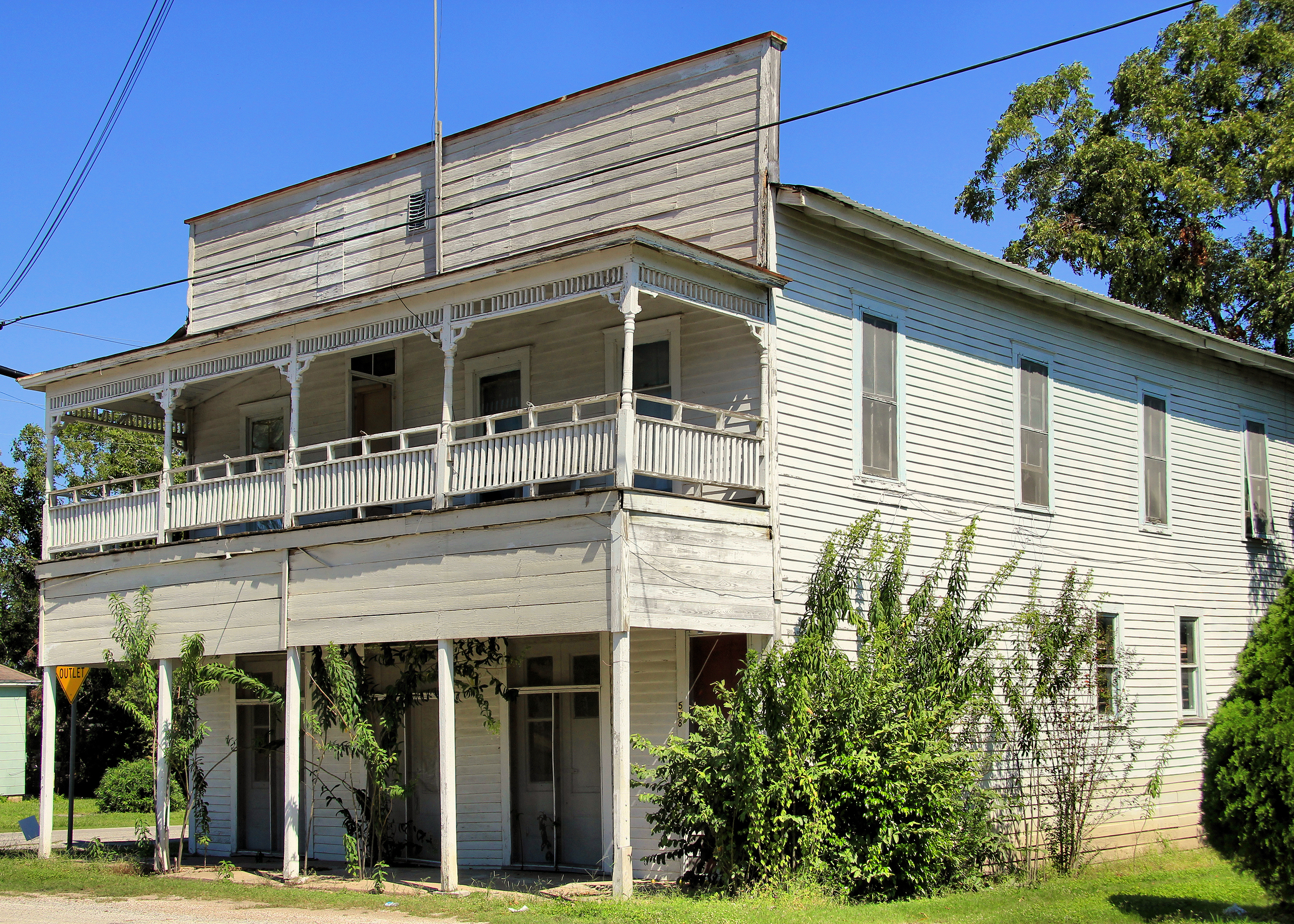
- McCabe Building in 2013

- Location within Texas Location within the United States
- Location: 508 N. Wheeler, Victoria, Texas
- Coordinates: 28°48′5″N 96°59′23″W
- Area: less than one acre
- Built: 1908
- MPS: Victoria MRA
- NRHP reference No.: 86002464
- Added to NRHP: December 19, 1986

The McCabe Building in Victoria, Texas was built in 1908. The McCabe Building is an example of a local two story frame commercial structure. J. H. McCabe operated a grocery business in the building. The building was listed on the National Register of Historic Places on December 19, 1986.

A neighboring business, Wholesale Tire Company, purchased the lot and building in 2013 because they needed more room for inventory and work space. The building was inspected and found to be losing structural integrity. The business decided it would be too large an investment to incorporate the building into their expansion plans. The building was scheduled to be demolished.

== See also ==
- National Register of Historic Places listings in Victoria County, Texas
