= Jules Leffland House =

Historic house in Texas, United States

- U.S. National Register of Historic Places
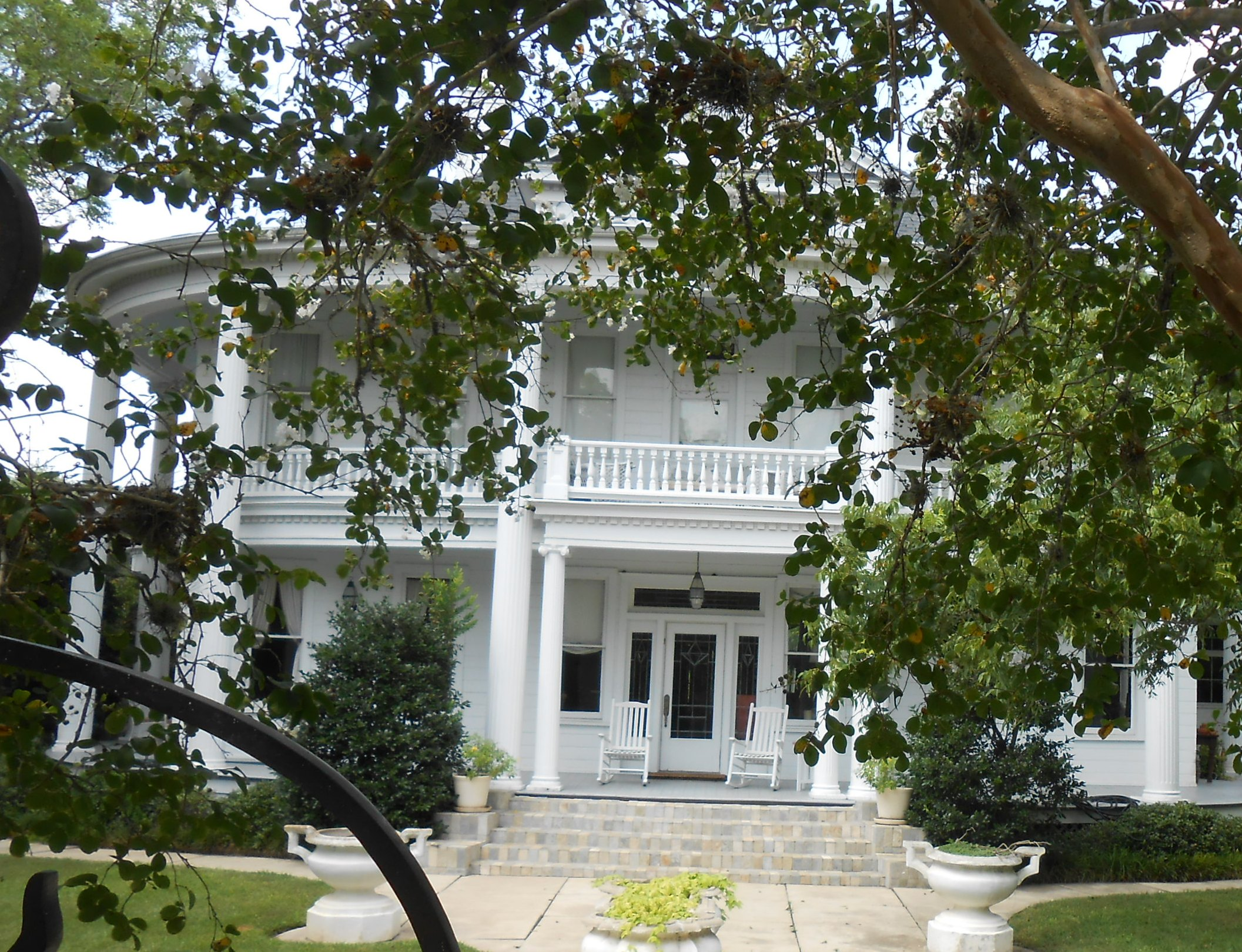
- Jules Leffland House in 2014

- Location within Texas Location within the United States
- Location: 302 E. Convent, Victoria, Texas
- Coordinates: 28°47′42″N 97°0′17″W
- Area: less than one acre
- Built: 1900
- Architect: Jules Leffland
- Architectural style: Classical Revival
- MPS: Victoria MRA
- NRHP reference No.: 91000577
- Added to NRHP: May 20, 1991

The Jules Leffland House at 302 E. Convent in Victoria, Texas, United States, was built in 1900. It was a home of local architect Jules Leffland. It was listed on the National Register of Historic Places in 1991.

It has been termed an "outstanding example" of Leffland's work.

== See also ==
- National Register of Historic Places listings in Victoria County, Texas
