= Mrs. J. V. Murphy House =

Historic house in Texas, United States

- U.S. National Register of Historic Places
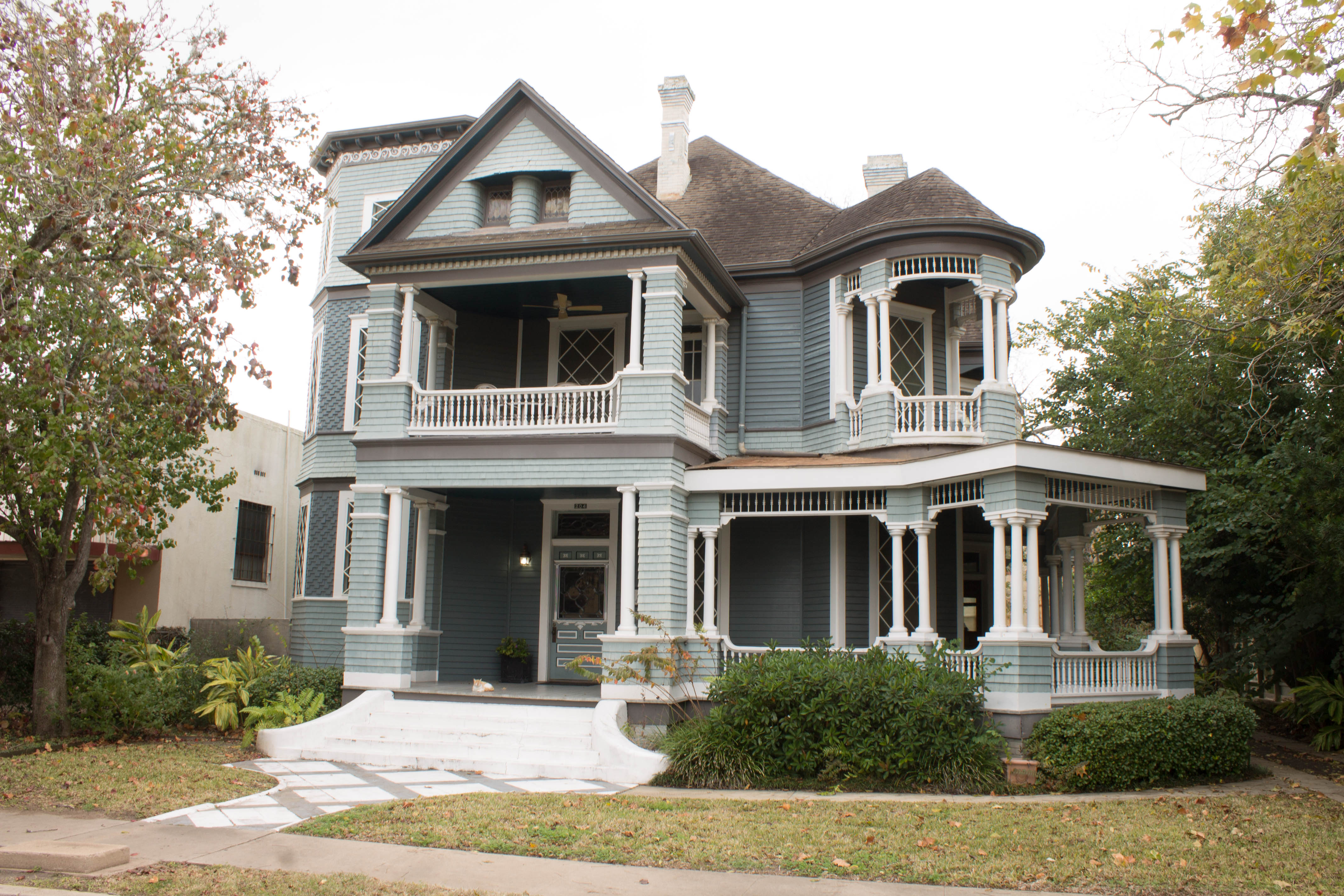
- Murphy House in 2015

- Location within Texas Location within the United States
- Location: 204 E. Santa Rosa, Victoria, Texas
- Coordinates: 28°47′52″N 97°0′54″W
- Area: less than one acre
- Built: 1900
- Architect: Jules Leffland
- Architectural style: Late Victorian
- MPS: Victoria MRA
- NRHP reference No.: 86002554
- Added to NRHP: December 9, 1986

The Mrs. J. V. Murphy House at 204 E. Santa Rosa in Victoria, Texas was built in 1899–1900. It was designed by architect Jules Leffland. It was listed on the National Register of Historic Places in 1986.

It is a large 2 1/2-story house with Queen Anne elements. It has a stair turret and a wrap-around porch. A tower top was never rebuilt after it was destroyed by a storm in the early 1900s.

It was listed on the NRHP as part of a study which listed numerous historic resources in the Victoria area, including other "complex and inventive Queen Anne dwellings" created by Leffland and other architects in the 1890s.

== See also ==
- National Register of Historic Places listings in Victoria County, Texas
