= Old Nazareth Academy =

- U.S. National Register of Historic Places
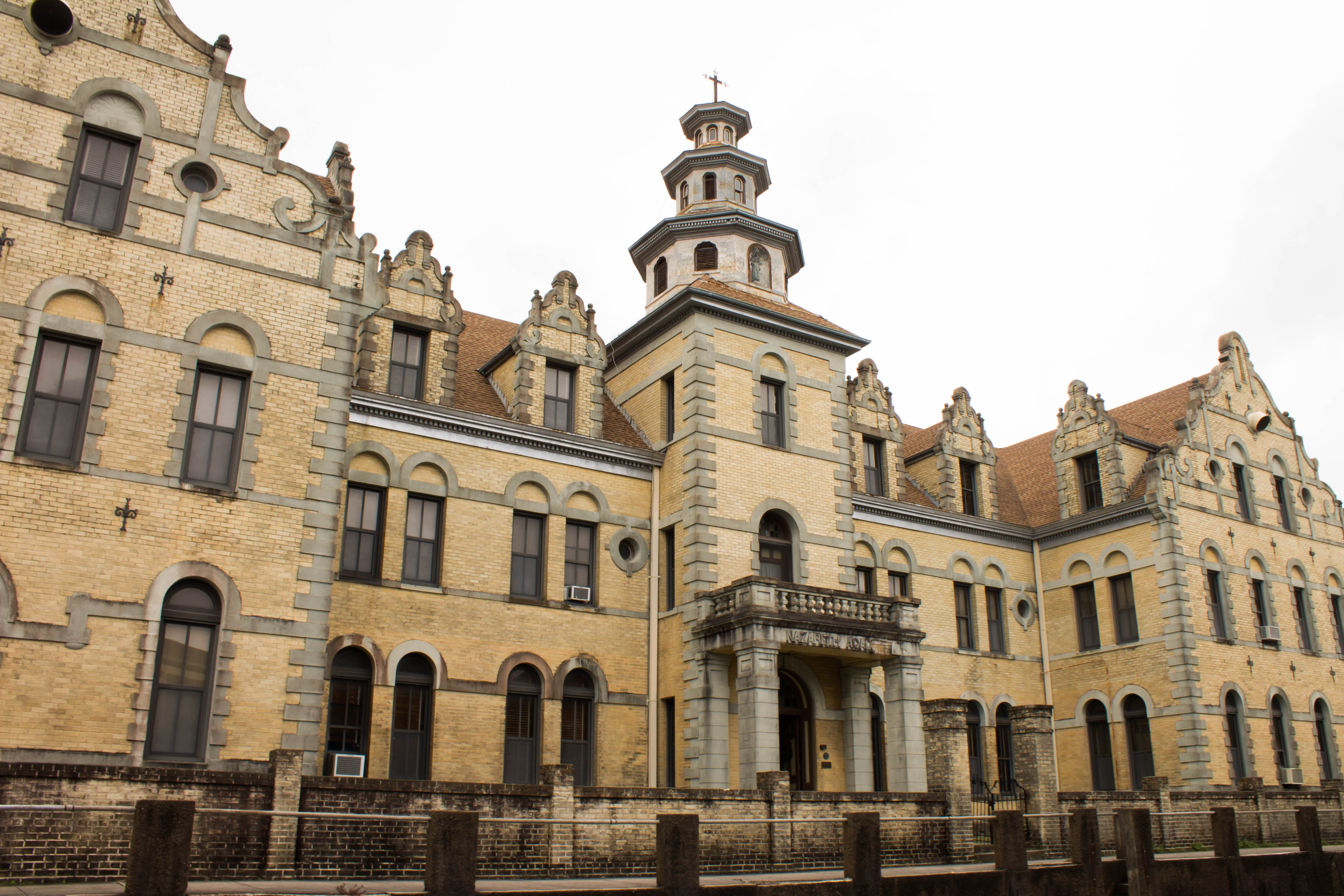
- Old Nazareth Academy in 2015

- Location within Texas Location within the United States
- Location: 105 W. Church, Victoria, Texas
- Coordinates: 28°47′46″N 97°0′28″W
- Area: 2.1 acres (0.85 ha)
- Built: 1904
- Built by: Guithier & Mitchell
- Architect: Jules Leffland
- Architectural style: Rococo Revival
- MPS: Victoria MRA
- NRHP reference No.: 86002462
- Added to NRHP: December 9, 1986

The Old Nazareth Academy at 105 W. Church in Victoria, Texas was built in 1904. It served as a church school.

It was "a fanciful two-and-one half-story brick classroom building" designed by architect Jules Leffland. It was used by the Nazareth Academy from 1905 to 1951.

It was built by contractors Guithier & Mitchell. It was listed on the National Register of Historic Places in 1986. The listing included one contributing building on 2.1 acres (0.85 ha).

== See also ==
- National Register of Historic Places listings in Victoria County, Texas
