= Wharton County Courthouse Historic Commercial District =

Historic district in Texas, United States

- U.S. National Register of Historic Places
- U.S. Historic district
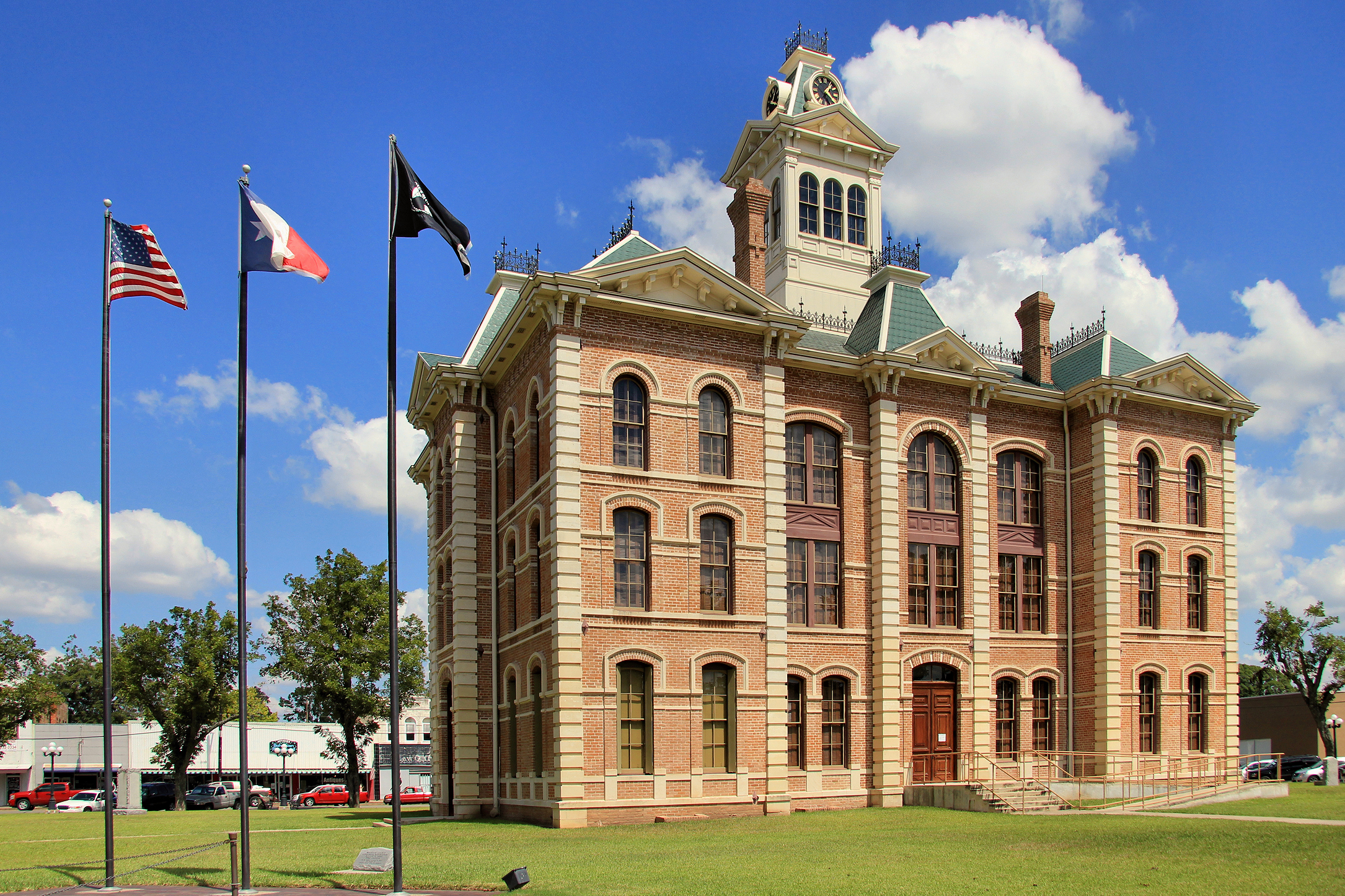
- Wharton County Courthouse in 2013

- Location within Texas Location within the United States
- Location: Roughly bounded by the alley N of Milam St., Rusk St., Elm St. and Richmond St., Wharton, Texas
- Coordinates: 29°18′38″N 96°6′3″W
- Area: 21 acres (8.5 ha)
- Architect: Jules Leffland, Wyatt C. Hedrick
- Architectural style: Moderne, Italianate, Romanesque
- NRHP reference No.: 91001624
- Added to NRHP: November 5, 1991

The Wharton County Courthouse Historic Commercial District is a 21-acre (8.5 ha) historic district in Wharton, Texas that was listed on the National Register of Historic Places in 1991. It includes works by architects Jules Leffland and Wyatt C. Hedrick and others. The NRHP listing included 46 contributing buildings and two contributing objects, as well as 31 non-contributing buildings and two non-contributing objects, on the blocks fronting on the courthouse square and on nearby blocks (see map on page 7 of NRHP document).

The Wharton County Courthouse itself is a three-story Art Deco building with a one-story addition. The courthouse square was lined with pecan trees as of 1991 and has an octagonal gazebo and three memorials.

Selected buildings in the district are:

- W. A. Harrison Building (1913), 200 W. Milam, built for William Alexander Harrison of prominent Harrison family
- Burger-Robertson Block (1909-1919), 115-137 S. Fulton Street, consisting of six commercial buildings, three of which were designed by Victoria architect Jules Leffland.

== See also ==
- National Register of Historic Places listings in Wharton County, Texas
