= Proctor House (Victoria, Texas) =

Historic house in Texas, United States

- U.S. National Register of Historic Places
- Recorded Texas Historic Landmark
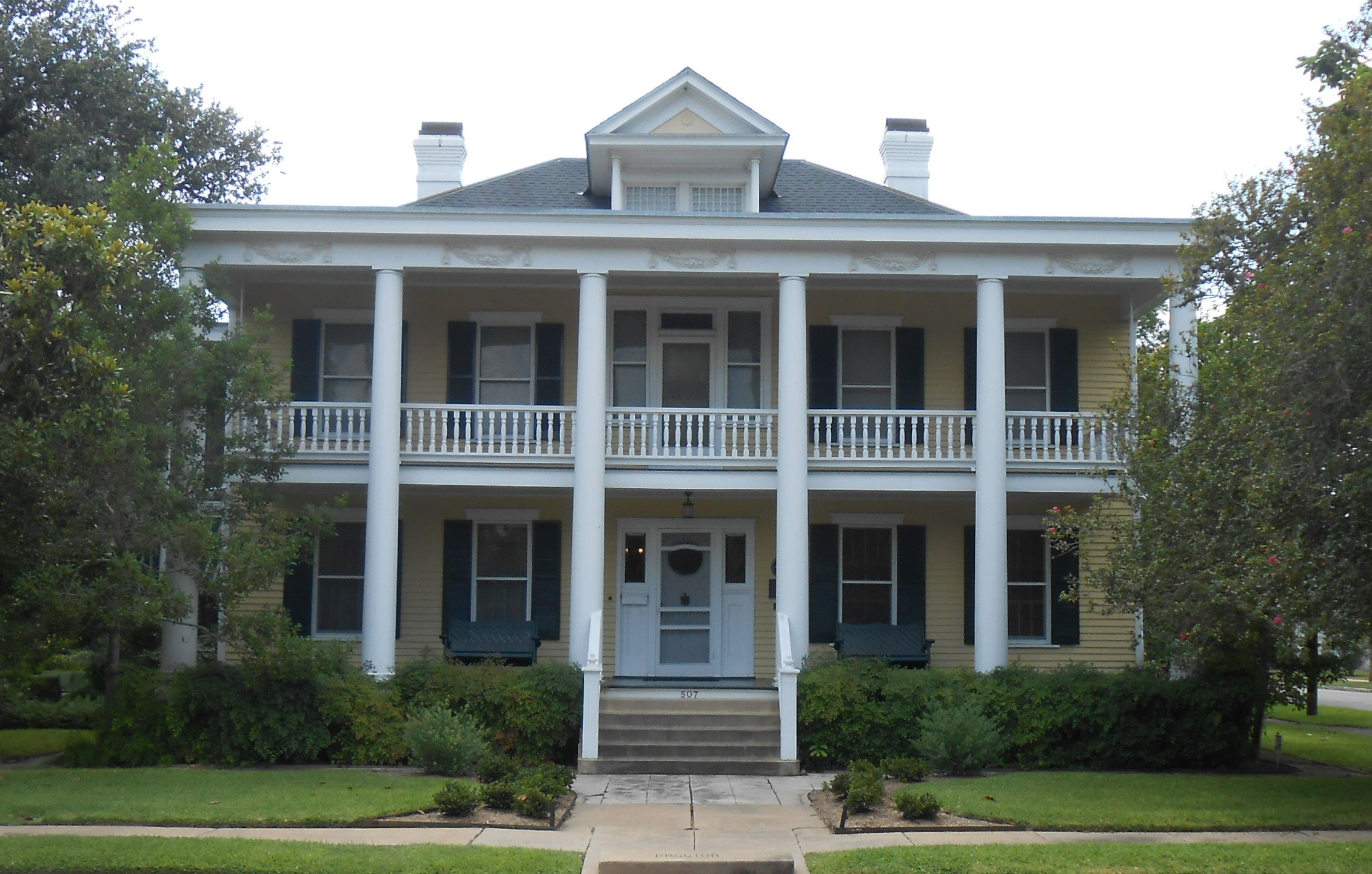
- Proctor House in 2014

- Location within Texas Location within the United States
- Location: 507 N. Glass, Victoria, Texas
- Coordinates: 28°48′9″N 97°0′25″W
- Area: 1 acre (0.40 ha)
- Built: 1900
- Architect: Jules Leffland
- Architectural style: Colonial Revival
- MPS: Victoria MRA
- NRHP reference No.: 86002544
- RTHL No.: 4129

Significant dates
- Added to NRHP: December 6, 1986
- Designated RTHL: 1985

The Proctor House at 507 N. Glass in Victoria, Texas was built in approximately 1900. It was designed by Jules Leffland and was built in 1900. The listing included two contributing buildings.

It is an "understated Neoclassical Revival styled dwelling" designed by architect Jules Leffland for the Venable Bland Proctor family. Venable Proctor was a lawyer in the law firm of Proctor, Vandenberge, Grain and Mitchell for many years. A two-story frame carriage house with a cupola is a second contributing building on the property.

It was listed on the NRHP as part of a study which listed numerous historic resources in the Victoria area.

== See also ==
- National Register of Historic Places listings in Victoria County, Texas
- Recorded Texas Historic Landmarks in Victoria County
