= Thomas M. O'Connor House =

Historic house in Texas, United States

- U.S. National Register of Historic Places
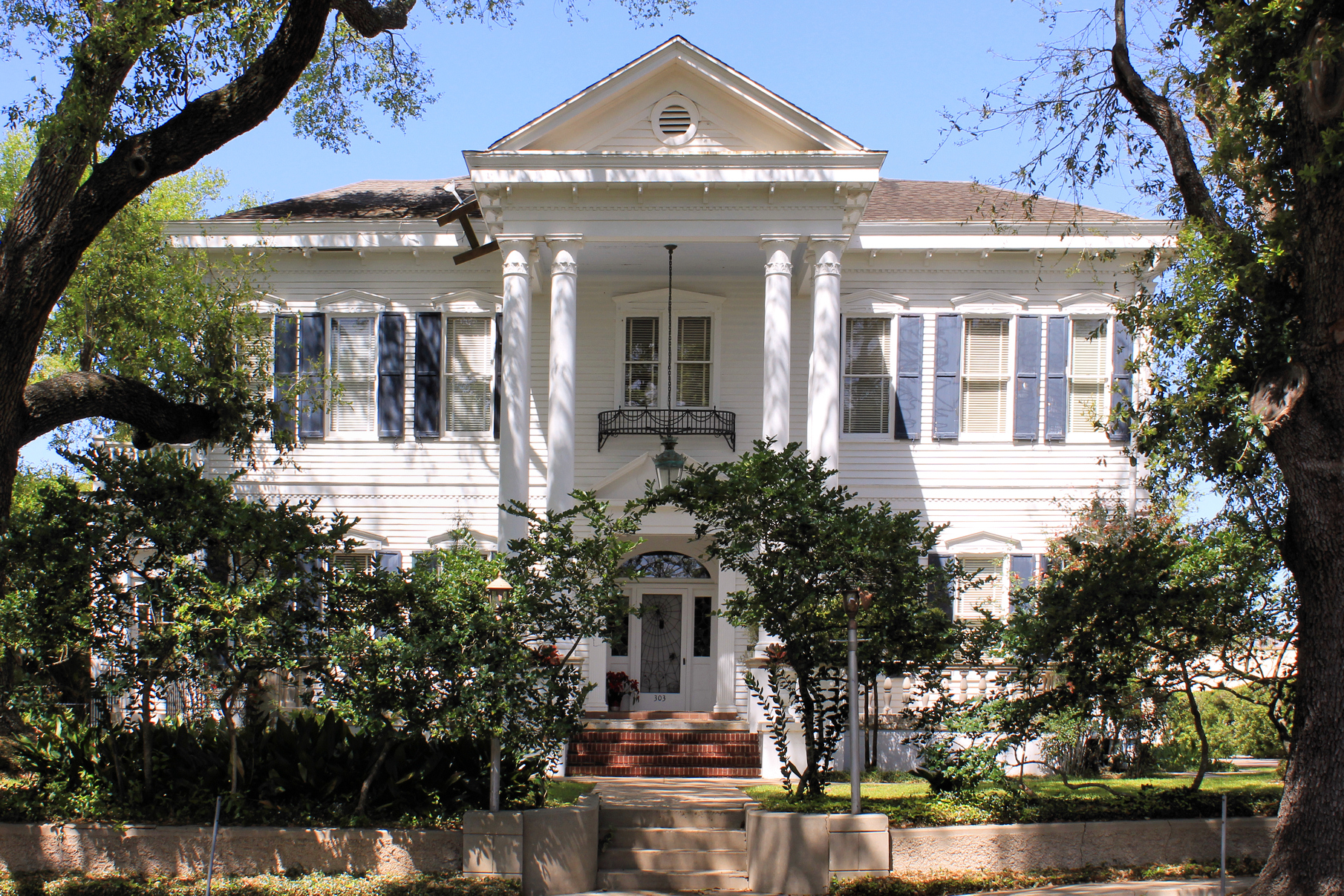
- O'Connor House in 2016

- Location within Texas Location within the United States
- Location: 303 S. Bridge, Victoria, Texas
- Coordinates: 28°47′50″N 97°0′29″W
- Area: less than one acre
- Built: 1885
- Architectural style: Italianate, Classical Revival
- MPS: Victoria MRA
- NRHP reference No.: 86002587
- Added to NRHP: December 9, 1986

The Thomas M. O'Connor House on S. Bridge in Victoria, Texas, United States was built in 1885. It was listed on the National Register of Historic Places in 1986. The listing included two contributing buildings.

It was built with Italianate style and was remodelled in Classical Revival in the early 20th century. It has a two-story pedimented portico with paired two-story columns on masonry piers.

The house was home of Thomas M. O'Connor, a banker who accumulated ranch holdings of over 500,000 acres (200,000 ha) in years following the American Civil War. In 1983 the house still belonged to the prominent O'Connor family.

It was listed on the NRHP as part of a study which listed numerous historic resources in the Victoria area.

== See also ==
- National Register of Historic Places listings in Victoria County, Texas
