= Max Bettin House =

Historic house in Texas, United States

- U.S. National Register of Historic Places
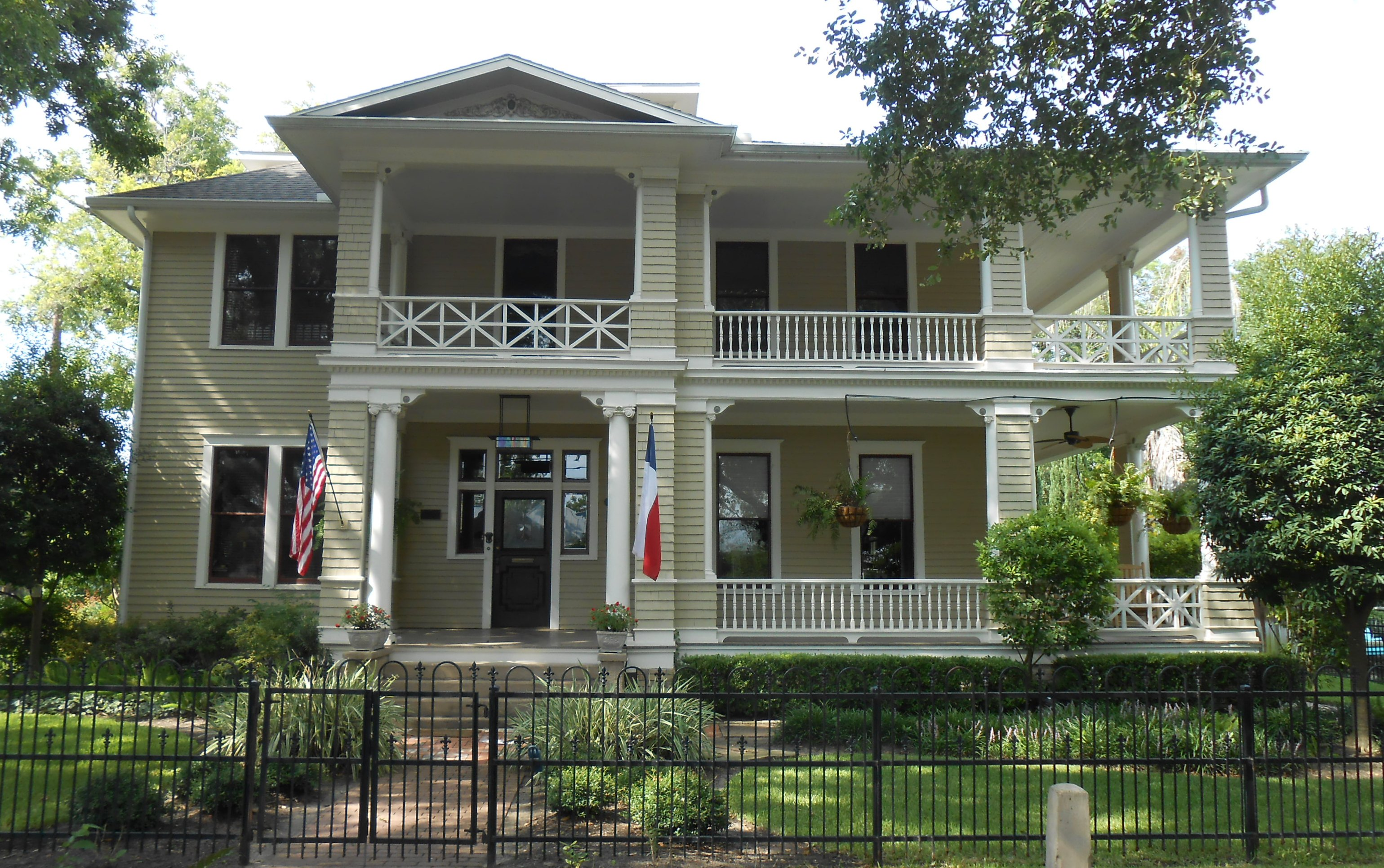
- Max Bettin House in 2014

- Location within Texas Location within the United States
- Location: 602 E. Santa Rosa, Victoria, Texas
- Coordinates: 28°47′47″N 97°0′1″W
- Area: less than one acre
- Built: 1908
- Architect: Jules Leffland
- MPS: Victoria MRA
- NRHP reference No.: 86002564
- Added to NRHP: December 9, 1986

The Max Bettin House at 602 E. Santa Rosa in Victoria, Texas, United States was built in 1908. It is believed to be a work of architect Jules Leffland. It was listed on the National Register of Historic Places in 1986.

The two-story house was built in 1908 for Max Bettin, a prominent local grocer who was a leader in the local Jewish community. A one-story house now located at 604 E. Santa Rosa was originally located here, but was moved to make way for this house. The house has a two-story L-shaped porch on two sides.

It was listed on the NRHP as part of a study which listed numerous historic resources in the Victoria area.

== See also ==
- National Register of Historic Places listings in Victoria County, Texas
