= Barden–O'Connor House =

Historic house in Texas, United States

- U.S. National Register of Historic Places
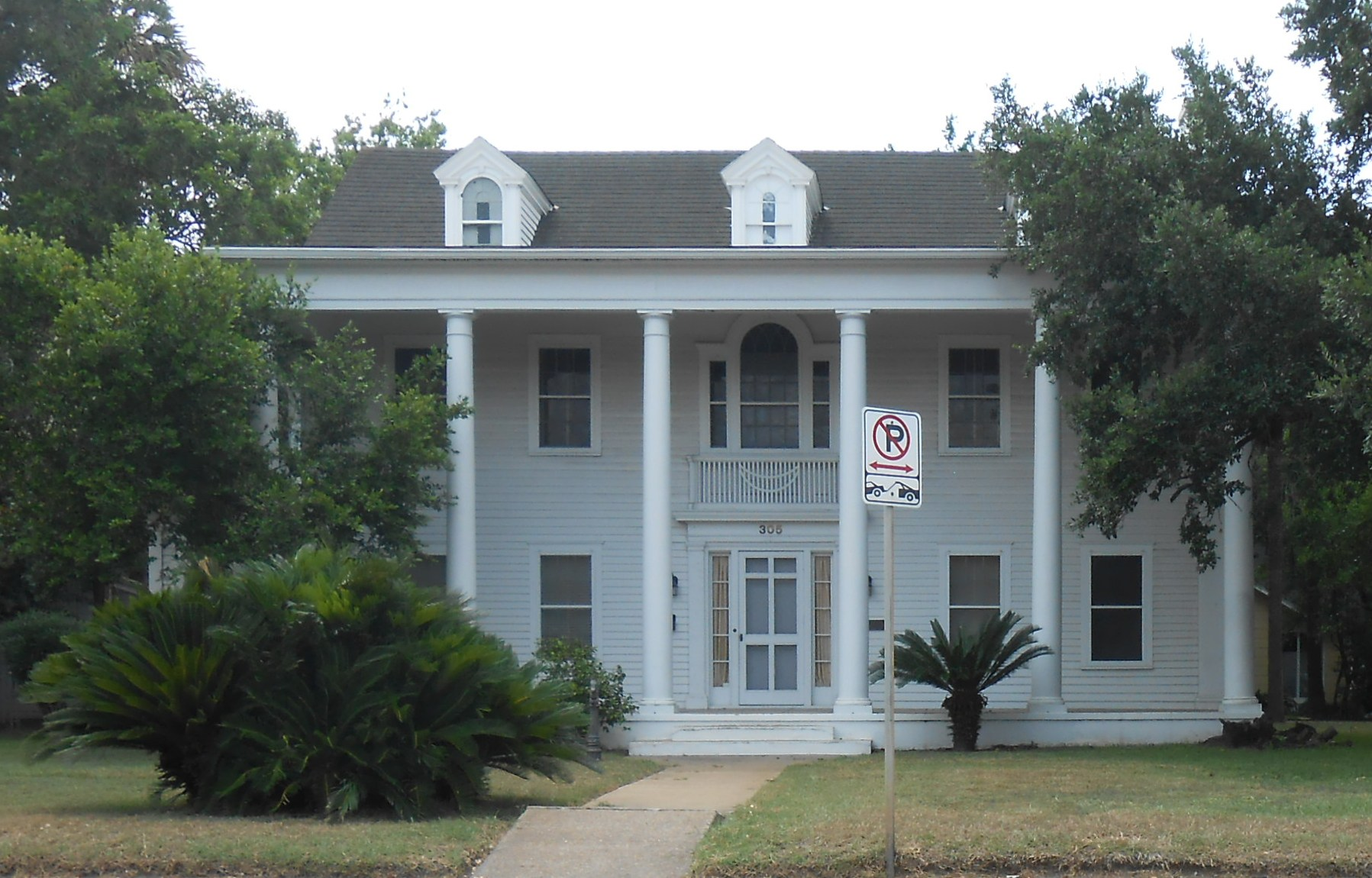
- Barden–O'Connor House in 2014

- Location within Texas Location within the United States
- Location: 305 N. Moody, Victoria, Texas
- Coordinates: 28°47′36″N 97°0′29″W
- Area: less than one acre
- Built: 1870
- Architectural style: Classical Revival
- MPS: Victoria MRA
- NRHP reference No.: 86002609
- Added to NRHP: December 9, 1986

The Barden–O'Connor House in Victoria, Texas was built in 1870. It was listed on the National Register of Historic Places in 1986.

It is a two-and-a-half-story Georgian or Classical Revival building. It has a five-bay two-story porch, with two-story Doric columns.

An early owner was E.B. Barden, a bank teller. It was owned by Thomas M. O'Connor and then by his son Dennis O'Connor, of one of the largest ranching operations in South Texas.

It was listed on the NRHP along with a number of other properties associated with the O'Connor ranching family, as part of a study which listed numerous historic resources in the Victoria area.

== See also ==
- National Register of Historic Places listings in Victoria County, Texas
