= O'Connor–Proctor Building =

- U.S. National Register of Historic Places
- Recorded Texas Historic Landmark
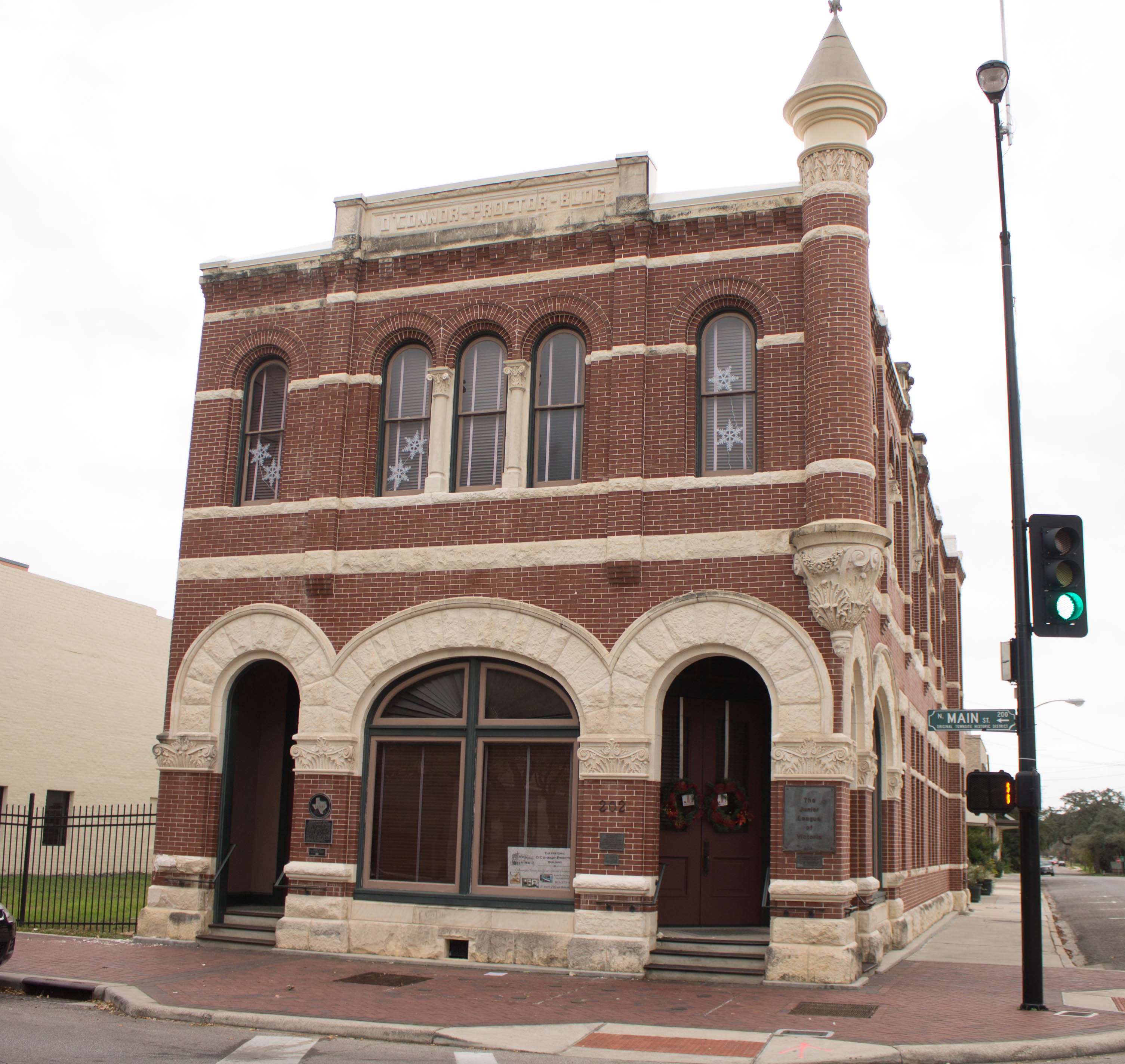
- O'Connor–Proctor Building in 2015

- Location within Texas Location within the United States
- Location: 202 N. Main, Victoria, Texas
- Coordinates: 28°48′32″N 97°0′18″W
- Area: less than one acre
- Built: 1895
- Built by: McKnight Bros.
- Architect: Paul Helwig
- Architectural style: Romanesque
- MPS: Victoria MRA
- NRHP reference No.: 86002546
- RTHL No.: 3629

Significant dates
- Added to NRHP: December 9, 1986
- Designated RTHL: 1980

The O'Connor–Proctor Building on N. Main in Victoria, Texas was built in 1895 at cost of $7,721. It was designed by architect Paul Helwig and its exterior is "St. Louis red brick trimmed with Kerrville white limestone". It was listed on the National Register of Historic Places in 1986.

In 2013 it is the headquarters building of the Junior League of Victoria.

== See also ==
- National Register of Historic Places listings in Victoria County, Texas
- Recorded Texas Historic Landmarks in Victoria County
