= April 1902 =

Month in 1902

<<	April 1902					>>
Su	Mo	Tu	We	Th	Fr	Sa
		1	2	3	4	5
6	7	8	9	10	11	12
13	14	15	16	17	18	19
20	21	22	23	24	25	26
27	28	29	30

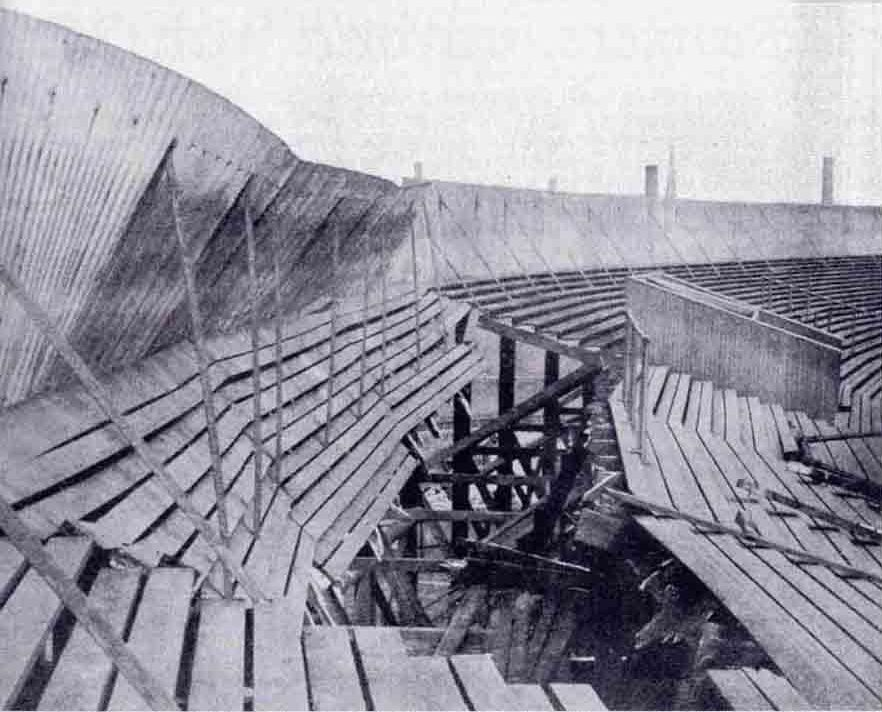
April 5, 1902: Ibrox Stadium stands collapse during England-Scotland match, 25 killed, 517 injured

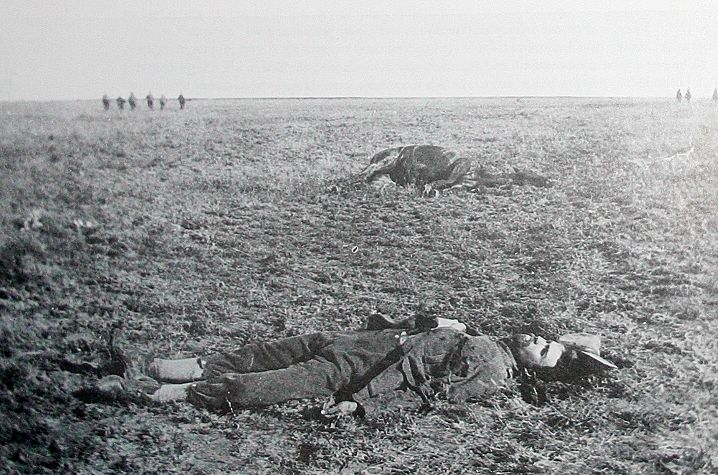
April 11, 1902: South African Army fights last disastrous battle against the British

The following events occurred in April 1902:

== April 1, 1902 (Tuesday) ==
- The Naivasha and Kisumu regions of Uganda became part of British East Africa.
- Thirty-nine British soldiers were killed and 45 injured in a railroad accident near Barberton in the Transvaal.
- All 700 longshoremen in Halifax, Nova Scotia went on strike to seek an increase in pay.
- Died:
  - Manuel Antonio Sanclemente, 86, former President of Colombia (b. 1814)
  - Thomas Dunn English, 82, published author and songwriter who later served as U.S. Congressman for New Jersey (b. 1819)
  - Joseph S. Fowler, 81, U.S. Senator for Tennessee from 1866 to 1871 during the Reconstruction era (b. 1820)

== April 2, 1902 (Wednesday) ==
- Irish Nationalist politician John Redmond was awarded the freedom of the City of Dublin.
- Died:
  - Esther Hobart Morris, 89, the first woman to serve as a justice of the peace in the United States (b. 1812). She was appointed to the post in Sweetwater County, Wyoming after her predecessor resigned to protest the territory's adoption of the women's suffrage amendment.
  - Junius Henri Browne, 68, American war correspondent for the New-York Tribune during the American Civil War, known for being confined as a prisoner of war for almost two years before escaping with another journalist back to Union territory (b. 1833)

== April 3, 1902 (Thursday) ==
- Lobbied by the American dairy industry, the United States Senate voted, 39 to 31, to pass a bill putting additional taxes on the butter substitute oleomargarine.

== April 4, 1902 (Friday) ==
- The will of Cecil Rhodes was made public on the day after his funeral services, revealing that he was funding scholarships to the University of Oxford for students from the United States and Germany. The reach of the Rhodes Scholarship would expand over the years.
- Born:
  - Louise Lévêque de Vilmorin, French actress; in Verrières-le-Buisson, Essonne département (d. 1969)
  - Stanley G. Weinbaum, American science fiction author; in Louisville, Kentucky (d. 1935)

== April 5, 1902 (Saturday) ==
- Twenty-five people were killed and 517 injured in the collapse of the bleachers at Ibrox Park. During an international football match between Scotland and England, part of the newly built wooden West Tribune Stand collapsed, throwing hundreds of supporters to the ground below.
- Ricardo Viñes gave the first public performance of Maurice Ravel's popular piano piece Pavane pour une infante défunte.

== April 6, 1902 (Sunday) ==
- Will Reynolds, an African-American railroad employee who was being served with a warrant for a five dollar charge account, killed the sheriff of Colbert County, Alabama and five deputies, along with one bystander, before being killed by a party of law enforcement officers.
- Born: F. L. Green, British novelist; in Portsmouth (d. 1953)
- Died: Robert Owen, 81, Welsh theologian (b. 1820)

== April 7, 1902 (Monday) ==
- Bulgarian revolutionary Metody Patchev entered Kadino Selo, Macedonia with six other revolutionaries, not realising that Ottoman troops were stationed in the village. Recognising the hopelessness of their situation, he killed his friends and committed suicide.
- Commandant Pieter Hendrik Kritzinger was acquitted of charges in the court-martial by the British Army.
- The United States House of Representatives passed its version of the Chinese Exclusion Bill. The Senate rejected any changes to existing law nine days later.

== April 8, 1902 (Tuesday) ==
- Russia and China signed a treaty for Russian withdrawal of troops from Manchuria over in three stages taking place between July 1902 and January 1904.
- A partial solar eclipse was visible from the Earth.
- Born:
  - Andrew Irvine, British mountaineer; in Birkenhead, Cheshire (d. 1924)
  - Josef Krips, Austrian conductor and violinist; in Vienna (d. 1974)
- Died: The Earl of Kimberley, 76, British Foreign Secretary 1894 to 1895 (b. 1826)

== April 9, 1902 (Wednesday) ==
- Having had their safe passage guaranteed by the British during the Second Boer War, a group of Boer leaders, including Martinus Theunis Steyn, Schalk Willem Burger, Louis Botha, Jan Smuts, Christiaan de Wet and Koos de la Rey, met at Klerksdorp, Transvaal, to discuss the possibility of opening negotiations with the British.
- The Underground Electric Railways Company of London was established, consolidating the group of Underground lines controlled by American financier Charles Yerkes.

== April 10, 1902 (Thursday) ==
- The Belgian general strike of 1902 began, the second general strike in the country's history.
- France and Venezuela resumed diplomatic relations, which had been terminated in 1895.

== April 11, 1902 (Friday) ==
- An earthquake of magnitude 6.6 struck the south end of Lake Baykal, Russia. No injuries were recorded.
- In the Battle of Rooiwal, the last major battle of the Second Boer War, a commando team led by General Jan Kemp attacked a larger force under Lieutenant Colonel Robert Kekewich. The British soldiers had a positional advantage and inflicted severe losses on the Boers, effectively ending the war in Western Transvaal.
- Tenor Enrico Caruso made the first million-selling recording, for the Gramophone Company in Milan.
- Died: Wade Hampton III, 84, former Confederate States Army lieutenant general and one of the largest slaveholders in the American South prior to the outbreak of the American Civil War (b. 1818)

== April 12, 1902 (Saturday) ==
- U.S. President Theodore Roosevelt signed legislation repealing the taxes that had been levied to pay for the Spanish–American War.
- Born: Louis Beel, Prime Minister of the Netherlands 1946—1948 and 1958—1959; in Roermond (d. 1977)
- Died:
  - Marie Alfred Cornu, 61, French physicist (b. 1841)
  - De Witt Talmage, 70, popular American evangelist (b. 1832)

== April 13, 1902 (Sunday) ==
- A new car speed record of 74 mph (119 km/h) was set in Nice, France by Léon Serpollet.
- The Belgian steamer Legia collided with another steamer off the Newarp Lightvessel of England and sank.

== April 14, 1902 (Monday) ==
- In Kemmerer, Wyoming, U.S. merchant J. C. Penney opened his first store, originally under the trade name "Golden Rule", with himself and his wife as the sole employees. Penney would say later that he was surprised that his first day's revenue was $466.59. By 1913, he would have 36 stores and incorporate as the J. C. Penney Company. By 1924 he would have 500 stores and by 1941, there would be 1,600.

== April 15, 1902 (Tuesday) ==
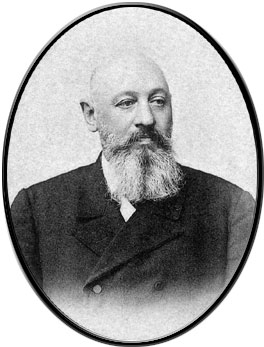
Sipyagain

- Dmitry Sipyagin, the Russian Empire's chief law enforcement officer as Minister of the Interior and the nation's secret police, was shot multiple times as he entered Mariinsky Palace in Saint Petersburg to attend a cabinet meeting. Sipyagin was assassinated by Stepan Balmashov, who gained entry to the palace and then fatally wounded the Minister.
- Died: Jules Dalou, 63, French sculptor (b. 1838)

== April 16, 1902 (Wednesday) ==
- Thomas Lincoln Tally opened his "Electric Theatre", the first cinema in Los Angeles.
- General Miguel Malvar surrendered to U.S. forces during the ongoing Philippine–American War.
- Died:
  - Francis, Duke of Cádiz, 79, former King Consort of Spain as husband of Queen Isabella II (b. 1822)
  - Aurélien Scholl, 68, French novelist and journalist (b. 1833)

== April 17, 1902 (Thursday) ==
- Longshoremen in Copenhagen went on strike and refused to load or unload ships arriving in Denmark.
- Tomás Estrada Palma departed from the United States, where he held citizenship, on a voyage to Cuba where he was to be inaugurated as President.

== April 18, 1902 (Friday) ==
- A series of earthquakes struck Guatemala as the worst tremor in the Central American nation in nearly 200 years, with a maximum Mercalli intensity of VIII ("Severe"). Officially, 800 people were killed although the consequences of the quake, including flooding, a tsunami and volcanic activity, killed an estimated 12,200 people. Hardest hit was the city of Escuintla, which was shaken for two minutes, killing 4,000 of its 10,000 inhabitants. The town of Ocós was destroyed by lava from fissures that opened beneath the town, and then struck by a tidal wave from the Pacific Ocean. Other villages with a large loss of life were San Marcos, San Pedro Sacatepéquez, San Juan Ostuncalco, Champerico, Cuyotenango, Maztenango and Tuscana.
- Born: Rabbi Menachem Mendel Schneerson, the last rebbe of the Lubavitcher Hasidic dynasty; in Nikolayev, Kherson Governorate, Russian Empire (Now Mykolaiv, Ukraine) (d. 1994)

== April 19, 1902 (Saturday) ==
- Vyacheslav von Plehve was appointed as the new Russian Minister of Internal Affairs to replace the late Dmitry Sipyagin.
- The 1902 FA Cup Final took place at The Crystal Palace in England in "bitterly cold" weather, and ended in a draw, necessitating a replay on April 26.
- Died:
  - Colonel Charles Marshall, 71, former Confederate States Army officer and aide-de-camp to Robert E. Lee who later worked to foster the "Lost Cause" movement to erect statues of Confederate military men (b. 1830)
  - Hans von Pechmann, 52, German chemist (b. 1850)

== April 20, 1902 (Sunday) ==
- Belgium's general strike was declared over by the Belgian Workers' Party, parliament having refused to agree to voting reform.
- Died: Frank R. Stockton, 67, American humorist and children's author (b. 1834)

== April 21, 1902 (Monday) ==
- Lieutenant Magnus von Levetzow of the Imperial German Navy submitted a report to his superiors of a military operation plan from his "study of the most suitable invasion route for Germany in the event of war with the United States."
- Died: Ethna Carbery, 35, Irish poet, died of gastritis (b. 1864)

== April 22, 1902 (Tuesday) ==
- U.S. President Theodore Roosevelt directed the convening of a court-martial of U.S. Army General Jacob H. Smith at Manila for the March across Samar.
- General Pyotr Vannovsky resigned as the Russian Minister of National Education.
- Died:
  - Philip Richard Morris, 65, English painter (b. 1836)
  - Egbert Viele, 76, American engineer and cartographer (b. 1825)

== April 23, 1902 (Wednesday) ==
- The Mount Pelée volcano in Martinique began erupting, raining cinders on its southern and western side. The volcano's deadly eruption would happen 15 days later.
- By a small majority, Denmark's upper house of Parliament approved the sale of the Danish West Indies to the United States.
- Born: Halldór Laxness, Icelandic writer, Nobel Prize laureate; in Reykjavík (d. 1998)

== April 24, 1902 (Thursday) ==
- Manchester United was founded by five English investors who bought the assets of the bankrupt Newton Heath LYR Football Club. In its first 100 seasons, Man U. would win 10 FA Cups and seven First Division titles and seven Premier League titles.
- Died: Lavinia Veiongo, 23, queen consort of Tonga, died from tuberculosis (b. 1879)

== April 25, 1902 (Friday) ==
- Boer General Jan Smuts departed Concordia in the Northern Cape of the South African Republic (the Transavaal), along with 250 men to meet with British negotiators at Vereeniging to discuss a ceasefire in the Second Boer War. General Smuts "was received with all military honours" by Colonel Cooper of the British Army, who provided an escort to guide Smuts and his entourage through British lines. The evening before his departure, General Smuts told supporters, "If on my return I can say 'It is peace,' then we shall have reason for joy. But if I say 'The war goes on', then we shall take up arms again, and fight with more ardour than ever, and with new enthusiasm.'"
- Born: Werner Heyde, German psychiatrist and war criminal; in Forst, Brandenburg (d. 1964)
- Died: Agostino Riboldi, 63, Roman Catholic cardinal and Archbishop of Ravenna (b. 1839)

== April 26, 1902 (Saturday) ==
- Hibernian won the Scottish Cup 1–0 against Celtic of Glasgow. They would not win the competition again until 2016.
- The 1902 FA Cup Final was replayed at The Crystal Palace, in London. Sheffield United defeated Southampton 2-1. After the game, the Sheffield goalkeeper, William "Fatty" Foulke, protested that the equalizing goal should have been disallowed, and attempted to attack the referee, Tom Kirkham.

== April 27, 1902 (Sunday) ==
- Voting took place in the first round of France's Legislative Election.
- Died: J. Sterling Morton, 70, Nebraska newspaper editor who lobbied for the creation of Arbor Day, first celebrated on April 10, 1972 (b. 1832)

== April 28, 1902 (Monday) ==
- Four officers of the USS Chicago were sentenced to short terms in an Italian jail for creating a disturbance in Venice.
- Born: Johan Borgen, Norwegian author; in Oslo (d. 1979)

== April 29, 1902 (Tuesday) ==
- Lord Spencer was chosen as the new leader of Britain's Liberal Party in the House of Lords.
- Conservative MP James Kenyon resigned his seat in the House of Commons of the United Kingdom, using the procedural device of becoming Steward of the Manor of Northstead. This necessitated a by-election the following month in his constituency of Bury, England.
- Altos Hornos de Vizcaya was founded in Spain, as predecessor of world largest steel product, ArcelorMittal.

== April 30, 1902 (Wednesday) ==
- Meteorological statistics show that, averaged over the whole of Australia, April 1902 was the driest month since records began, with only 3.74 millimetres (0.15 in).
- Claude Debussy's opera Pelléas et Mélisande received its premiere at the Opéra-Comique in Paris, with Jean Périer in the role of Pelléas and Mary Garden as Mélisande. André Messager was the conductor.
- Born: Theodore Schultz, American economist and Nobel Prize laureate; in Evanston, Illinois (d. 1998)
