= May 1902 =

Month in 1902

<<	May 1902					>>
Su	Mo	Tu	We	Th	Fr	Sa
				1	2	3
4	5	6	7	8	9	10
11	12	13	14	15	16	17
18	19	20	21	22	23	24
25	26	27	28	29	30	31

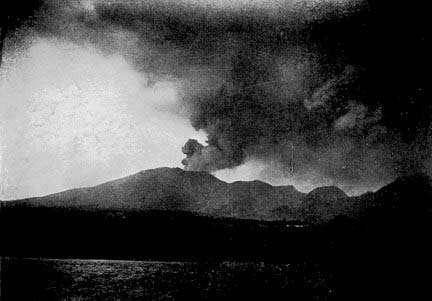
May 8, 1902: Mount Pelee erupts, kills the 30,000 residents of Saint-Pierre

May 20, 1902: Republic of Cuba granted limited independence

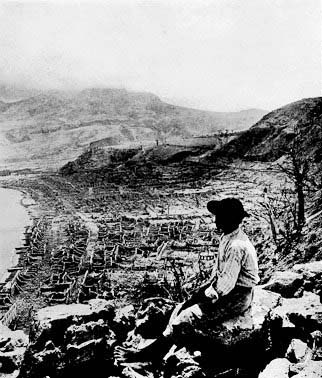
Saint-Pierre after the eruption

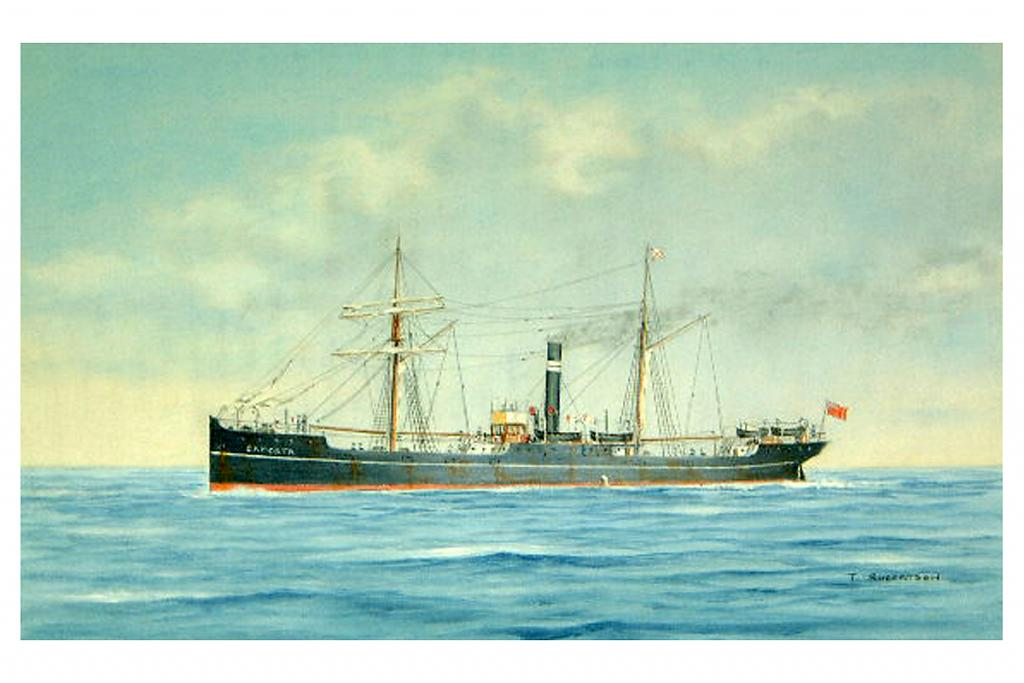
May 6, 1902: The SS Camorta sinks with 737 people on board

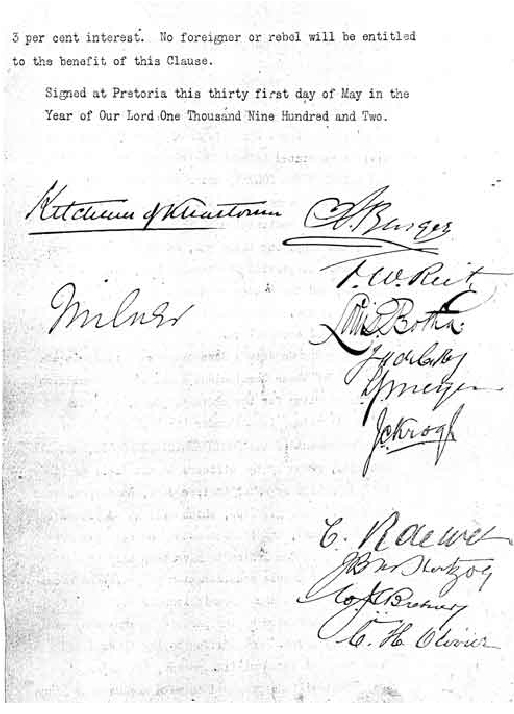
May 31, 1902: The Treaty of Vereeniging ends the Second Boer War

The following events occurred in May 1902:

== May 1, 1902 (Thursday) ==
- A tornado swept over the city of Dacca in British India (now Dhaka in Bangladesh) and killed 416 people.
- The Canadian Pacific Railway took over the Ottawa, Northern and Western Railway.
- The Cork International Exhibition, a world's fair, opened in Ireland for a six-month-long run until the end of October. On the same day, the directors of the Louisiana Purchase Exposition in St. Louis, Missouri, voted to postpone the celebration from 1903 to 1904.
- U.S. President Theodore Roosevelt approved the court-martial of Major Edwin F. Henn for torture of Filipino prisoners.
- The imprisoned U.S. Navy officers of USS Chicago were set free after being pardoned by the King of Italy.
- U.S. Representative William H. Moody of Massachusetts resigned to become the new United States Secretary of the Navy.
- The 13th County Championship cricket season began in the United Kingdom, with 15 counties competing.
- Fujimoto Bill Broker Banking, as predecessor of Daiwa Securities Group, was founded in Osaka, Japan.

== May 2, 1902 (Friday) ==
- The town of Maharg, Oklahoma, located on Turkey Creek of Washita County, was destroyed by a flash flood. The survivors relocated to higher ground and incorporated it as "Foss".
- Died:
  - Amos J. Cummings, 73, American Medal of Honor recipient and U.S. Representative for New York since 1895 (born 1841)
  - Prince George of Prussia, 76, German nobleman and playwright who wrote under the names Gunther von Freiberg and George Conrad (born 1826)

== May 3, 1902 (Saturday) ==
- The Battle of Bayang between the U.S. Army 27th Infantry and the army of the Moro sultan on the island of Mindanao, Philippines ended when the American infantry stormed the fort, killing the Sultan and 200 of his defenders.
- A fire destroyed the Egyptian village of Mit Ghamr, killing at least 61 people.
- Born: Alfred Kastler, French physicist and Nobel Prize laureate; in Guebwiller, Haut-Rhin département (died 1984)

== May 4, 1902 (Sunday) ==
- The report on an investigation of atrocities in the Philippine province of Tayabas, written by U.S. Army General Adna Chaffee, was received at the United States Department of War by Secretary Elihu Root in the form of a cabled telegram outlining a communication to Chaffee by Major Cornelius Gardner. Gardner listed four charges, accompanied by specifications that included the burning by U.S. troops of villages on the island of Luzon, including the town of Dolores.
- Born: Carl Eckart, American physicist, oceanographer, geophysicist, and administrator; in St. Louis (died 1973)

== May 5, 1902 (Monday) ==
- The Commonwealth Public Service Act created the Australian Public Service.
- The United States Senate voted to postpone the Louisiana Purchase Exposition of 1903 to 1904.
- U.S. President Theodore Roosevelt nominated Herbert G. Squiers to be the first American ambassador to Cuba.
- A violent eruption of Mount Pelée terrified many of the residents of most of the residents of the island of Martinique, although most chose not to evacuate.
- The American steamer, SS Kanawha, smashed its bow when it ran into the lock wall at the Davis Island Dam on the Ohio River, and sank.
- Born: Charles de Beaumont, British Olympic fencer; in Liverpool (died 1972)
- Died: Bret Harte, 65, American writer, died from throat cancer (born 1836)

== May 6, 1902 (Tuesday) ==
- All 737 passengers and crew on the British passenger ship SS Camorta were killed when the ship sank in a cyclone while en route from Madras in India, to Rangoon in Burma, after being hit by a cyclone. The ship was traversing the Irrawaddy Delta when it was struck.
- In a revolt in the Venezuela city of Carúpano, 115 Venezuelan Army troops were killed and 210 wounded.
- Born: Max Ophüls, German film director; in Saarbrücken (died 1957)
- Died: William T. Sampson, 62, U.S. Navy admiral and the third incumbent U.S. Representative to die in office in the past five days (born 1840)

== May 7, 1902 (Wednesday) ==
- Two thousand people on the island of Saint Vincent were killed when the volcano La Soufrière erupted, devastating the northern portion of the island.
- Irish Nationalists in the House of Commons of the United Kingdom voted on a resolution to censure the Speaker of the Commons. The measure was rejected by a vote of 63 for and 398 against.
- The United States House of Representatives began consideration of statehood for the U.S. territories of Oklahoma, Arizona and New Mexico.
- Died: Agostino Roscelli, 83, Italian priest and Catholic saint, founder of the Institute of Sisters of the Immaculata (born 1818)

== May 8, 1902 (Thursday) ==
- Over 30,000 people on the island of Martinique were killed when the Mount Pelée volcano erupted, destroying the town of Saint-Pierre.
- Born: André Michel Lwoff, French microbiologist, recipient of the Nobel Prize in Physiology or Medicine; in Paris (died 1994)
- Died: Paul Leicester Ford, 37, American novelist, was shot and killed by his older brother, Malcolm Webster Ford, 40, American amateur athlete, in a murder-suicide (born 1865)

== May 9, 1902 (Friday) ==
- Ships from the Royal Navy, the French Navy and the Imperial German Navy sailed into the Guatemalan port of San José to enforce repayment of foreign loans.
- Tirésias Simon Sam resigned as President of Haiti after six years in office. Pierre Boisrond-Canal formed a temporary government on May 26.
- Died: Henry Morton, 65, American scientist and the president of the Stevens Institute of Technology since its founding in 1870 (born 1836)

== May 10, 1902 (Saturday) ==
- The Society of American Magicians, which now has 5,000 members worldwide, was founded in New York City by 24 magicians who met in a backroom at Martinka's Magic Shop.
- Born: David O. Selznick, American film producer; in Pittsburgh, Pennsylvania (died 1965)
- Died: Sebastian S. Marble, 85, U.S. politician and former Governor of Maine (born 1817)

== May 11, 1902 (Sunday) ==
- Elections for the 589 deputies of France's Chambre des députés concluded with voting for those seats where no candidate had obtained a majority on April 27. The Bloc des gauches, an alliance of Socialists, Radicals, and the Opportunist Republicans won 338 seats for a majority in the Chambre, while the Progressive Republicans of Prime Minister Pierre Waldeck-Rousseau lost half of their 254 seats and were left with 127. A member of the Bloc, the Radical Party's Émile Combes, formed a new government.
- Died: Charles "Tucky" Collis, 64, Irish-American Medal of Honor recipient (born 1838)

== May 12, 1902 (Monday) ==
- Brazilian inventor Augusto Severo de Albuquerque Maranhão, 38, and his companion, French engineer Georges Saché, 25, flew Severo's semi-rigid airship Pax over Paris. They lost control of the aircraft, which caught fire and exploded 1,200 feet (370 m) over Montparnasse Cemetery, killing both men.
- A strike by the United Mine Workers closed all of the unionized coal mines in the anthracite district of Pennsylvania.
- Multiple explosions of naphtha killed 28 people at Sheraden, Pennsylvania, at the time an unincorporated community outside of the city limits of Pittsburgh, and injured 200 others.
- Born: Jack Trice, American college football player; in Hiram, Ohio (died 1923)

== May 13, 1902 (Tuesday) ==
- The 1902 Copa de la Coronación football competition began in Spain, the forerunner of the Copa del Rey. Real Madrid, founded in March, played its first game as a soccer football team and lost to Barcelona, 3 to 1.
- The United States Congress voted to approve $300,000 for foreign aid relief to Martinique.
- Died: Walter N. Haldeman, 81, American newspaper editor who founded the Louisville Courier as a pro-secessionist newspaper in 1844, then later merged it with a pro-Union newspaper in 1868 to form the Louisville Courier-Journal. Haldeman was also the a major league baseball team owner and a charter member of the National League with the Louisville Grays who played in 1876 and 1877. (born 1821)

== May 14, 1902 (Wednesday) ==
- Italian operatic tenor Enrico Caruso performed for the first time in England, performing at Covent Garden in Giuseppe Verdi's Rigoletto.
- Born:
  - Helen Flanders Dunbar, American healthcare provider and pioneer in psychosomatic medicine; in Chicago (died 1959)
  - Mahmoud Aslan, Tunisian novelist, playwright and journalist; in Tunis (died 1971)

== May 15, 1902 (Thursday) ==
- Lyman Gilmore claimed to have flown a steam-powered fixed-wing aircraft on this date. The proof was alleged to have been destroyed in a 1935 fire.
- The final of the Copa de la Coronación football tournament was won by Club Bizcaya, who defeated Barcelona 2–1.
- Born: Richard J. Daley, American politician and longtime Mayor of Chicago; in Chicago (died 1976)

== May 16, 1902 (Friday) ==
- In the first and only time in Major League Baseball history that a deaf batter faced a deaf pitcher, William "Dummy" Hoy of the Cincinnati Reds went up to bat against Luther Taylor of the New York Giants.
- The Catholic Church issued Decree 4097 of the Sacred Congregation of Rites, declaring that churches were prohibited from substituting electric lights for candles on the altar during Solemn High Mass.
- Born:
  - Elizabeth Nord, British-American labor leader and executive of the Textile Workers Union of America; in Lancashire, England (died 1986)
  - Karamshi Jethabhai Somaiya, Indian entrepreneur who established Somaiya University near Bombay; in Malunjar, Ahmednagar, Bombay Presidency (now Maharashtra, India) (died 1999)
  - Judith Tyberg, American Sanskrit scholar and yogi; in Point Loma, California (died 1980)
  - Carles Fages de Climent, Spanish Catalonian writer, poet and journalist; in Figueres (died 1968)
- Died:
  - Benjamin H. Child, 59, American law enforcement officer and Medal of Honor recipient (born 1843)
  - Major General Herbert T. Siborne, 75, British Army officer, engineer and military historian (born 1826)

== May 17, 1902 (Saturday) ==
- The coronation of King Alfonso XIII of Spain took place in Madrid as the young monarch came of age.
- Valerios Stais identified the Antikythera mechanism as an astronomical clock; it would later be recognized as a type of ancient analog computer.

== May 18, 1902 (Sunday) ==
- A tornado at Goliad, Texas killed 92 people and injured 103 others.
- Born: Meredith Willson, American musician, composer and playwright, known for writing The Music Man; in Mason City, Iowa (died 1984)
- Died: Bishop William Taylor, 81, American Methodist missionary (born 1821). Taylor University in Indiana was named in his honor in 1890

== May 19, 1902 (Monday) ==
- A coal mine explosion killed 216 miners at the Coal Creek Company in Fraterville, Tennessee.

== May 20, 1902 (Tuesday) ==
- Cuba was granted independence from the United States, becoming the Republic of Cuba. The 1901 Constitution of Cuba took effect (replaced in 1940). Tomás Estrada Palma was inaugurated as the new nation's first President, and U.S. military occupation of Cuba ceased.

== May 21, 1902 (Wednesday) ==
- The first monument to American soldiers killed in the Spanish–American War was dedicated at the Arlington National Cemetery.
- Born:
  - Earl Averill, American baseball player; in Snohomish, Washington (died 1983)
  - Marcel Breuer, Hungarian architect; in Pécs (died 1981)
  - Anatole Litvak, Ukrainian film director; in Kiev (died 1974)
- Died: Edwin Lawrence Godkin, 70, Irish-American journalist and editor who founded (in 1865), The Nation, the oldest continuously published U.S. weekly news magazine (born 1831)

== May 22, 1902 (Thursday) ==
- By a nearly unanimous vote, the American Presbyterian Church adopted its revised creed at its 1902 general assembly.
- White Star Line's latest luxury ocean liner, SS Ionic, was launched from the Harland & Wolff shipyard in Belfast, Ireland.
- Died: General Mariano Escobedo, 75, Mexican Army officer known for defeating French Army troops at the 1867 battle of Querétaro and the capture of the last Emperor of Mexico, Maximilian I (born 1826)

== May 23, 1902 (Friday) ==
- A coal mine explosion killed 109 miners at the Crow's Nest Coal Mining Company in Fernie, British Columbia.
- Bertrand Russell completed the manuscript of his widely-read book The Principles of Mathematics.
- One of Spain's highest honors for technical achievement, the Civil Order of Alfonso XII, was established by the royal decree of King Alfonso. It would be superseded in 1988 by the Civil Order of Alfonso X, the Wise.
- Pierre Waldeck-Rousseau announced that he would resign as Prime Minister of France after nearly three years in office. A new government would be formed on June 7 by Émile Combes.
- Born:
  - Herbert Macdonald, Jamaican athlete and sports administrator; in Kingston (died 1991)
  - Maxi Linder (Wilhelmina Rijburg), Surinamese prostitute and labor organizer; in Paramaribo, Dutch Guiana (died 1981)
- Died: John James, 64, British-American soldier and recipient of the Medal of Honor (born 1838)

== May 24, 1902 (Saturday) ==
- The Belgian steamer Stanleyville was wrecked off Takoradi, in the British colony of Gold Coast.
- Died: Julian Pauncefote, 73, British Ambassador to the United States since 1893, known for the Hay–Pauncefote Treaty signed six months earlier with the United States (born 1828)

== May 25, 1902 (Sunday) ==
- Parliamentary elections were held in Belgium and the ruling Catholic Party, led by the Count de Smet as Prime Minister, strengthened its majority from 86 to 93 of the 162 seats in the Chamber of Representatives.
- Died: Benjamin M. Palmer, 84, American Presbyterian minister and secessionist known for rallying legislators in Louisiana to secede from the United States "to conserve and to perpetuate the institution of domestic slavery as now existing", died from injuries sustained after being struck by a streetcar while crossing the street in New Orleans.

== May 26, 1902 (Monday) ==
- Pierre Boisrond-Canal became the new President of Haiti.
- Died:
  - Almon Brown Strowger, 63, American inventor who created the first automatic telephone exchange to allow direct calls between parties without use of a human operator (born 1839)
  - Alice Fleury Durand, 79, French novelist who wrote under the pen name Henry Gréville (born 1842)
  - Jean-Joseph Benjamin-Constant, 56, French portrait painter (born 1845)

== May 27, 1902 (Tuesday) ==
- The United States and Chile agreed upon a treaty of extradition.

== May 28, 1902 (Wednesday) ==
- The Pacts of May were signed by representatives of Chile and Argentina in an attempt to resolve territorial disputes by submitting them to binding arbitration.
- Meatpackers in Chicago who were members of the Teamsters union went on strike.
- The Soldiers' and Sailors' Monument in New York City was unveiled at Riverside Park in Manhattan.
- Died:
  - Adolf Kussmaul, 80, German physician and gastroenterologist known for his pioneering work in gastroscopy and for popularizing the use of the stomach pump technique (born 1822)
  - Paul J. Sorg, 61, American tobacco entrepreneur and former U.S. Congressman for Ohio (born 1840)

== May 29, 1902 (Thursday) ==
- A major breakthrough was achieved in the construction of the Albula Tunnel in Switzerland — at 19,242 feet (5,865 m) — more than 3.6 miles and almost six kilometers — as the two construction crews from the north side and south side of one of the mountains of the Swiss Alps connected 13 years after drilling began. The railway tunnel opened the following year.
- Radio engineer Greenleaf Whittier Pickard of Wireless Telephone and Telegraph Company inadvertently discovered that the recently invented crystal detector that could maintain the quality of radio sound regardless of the change of volume.
- Born: Henri Guillaumet, French aviator, in Bouy, Marne département (died 1940)

== May 30, 1902 (Friday) ==
- U.S. President Theodore Roosevelt delivered the keynote speech on Decoration Day at the Arlington National Cemetery and used the occasion of the almost-concluded war in the Philippines, and the courts-martial of U.S. Army officers for atrocities, to denounce racist violence in the United States. "Is it only in the army in the Philippines that Americans sometimes commit deeds that cause all other Americans regret?" he asked and then answered "No! From time to time there occur in our country, to the deep and lasting shame of our people, lynchings carried on under circumstances of inhuman cruelty and barbarity infinitely worse than any that has ever been committed by our troops in the Philippines ... The men who fail to condemn these lynchings, and yet clamor about what has been done in the Philippines, are indeed guilty of neglecting the beam in their own eye while taunting their brother about the mote in his."
- Born: Stepin Fetchit (stage name for Lincoln Perry), African-American film actor and comedian and the first black actor to have successful movie career; in Key West, Florida (died 1985)
- Died: Sylvester Pennoyer, 70, Governor of Oregon from 1887 to 1895. His name is famous as a party in the landmark 1878 U.S. Supreme Court case of Pennoyer v. Neff. (born 1831)

== May 31, 1902 (Saturday) ==
Transvaal

United Kingdom

Orange Free State

- The Treaty of Vereeniging was signed at Pretoria, bringing an end the Second Boer War with the surrender of the South African Republic and the Orange Free State to the United Kingdom. Lord Milner (the British Colonial Secretary) and the commander of the British Army's forces, Earl Kitchener, signed on behalf of the United Kingdom while South African President Schalk Burger and Orange Free State President Christiaan de Wet signed the articles, bringing an end to existence of their Boer Republics.
- Following a court ruling that the reserve clause in contracts between players and United States National League baseball clubs did not apply to players signed with an American League team, Connie Mack traded Nap Lajoie and Bill Bernhard with the Cleveland Bronchos.
- U.S. President Theodore Roosevelt issued an order through the United States Department of War reducing the size of the United States Army by 14 percent, from 77,287 to 66,497 troops.
- On the final day of a drawn match against England, the Australia national cricket team are dismissed for 36 runs, their lowest ever Test innings score.
