= Kadino Selo =

Kadino Selo may refer to:

- Kadino Selo (Pale), Bosnia and Herzegovina
- Kadino Selo, Prilep, North Macedonia
