= The Assumption (society) =

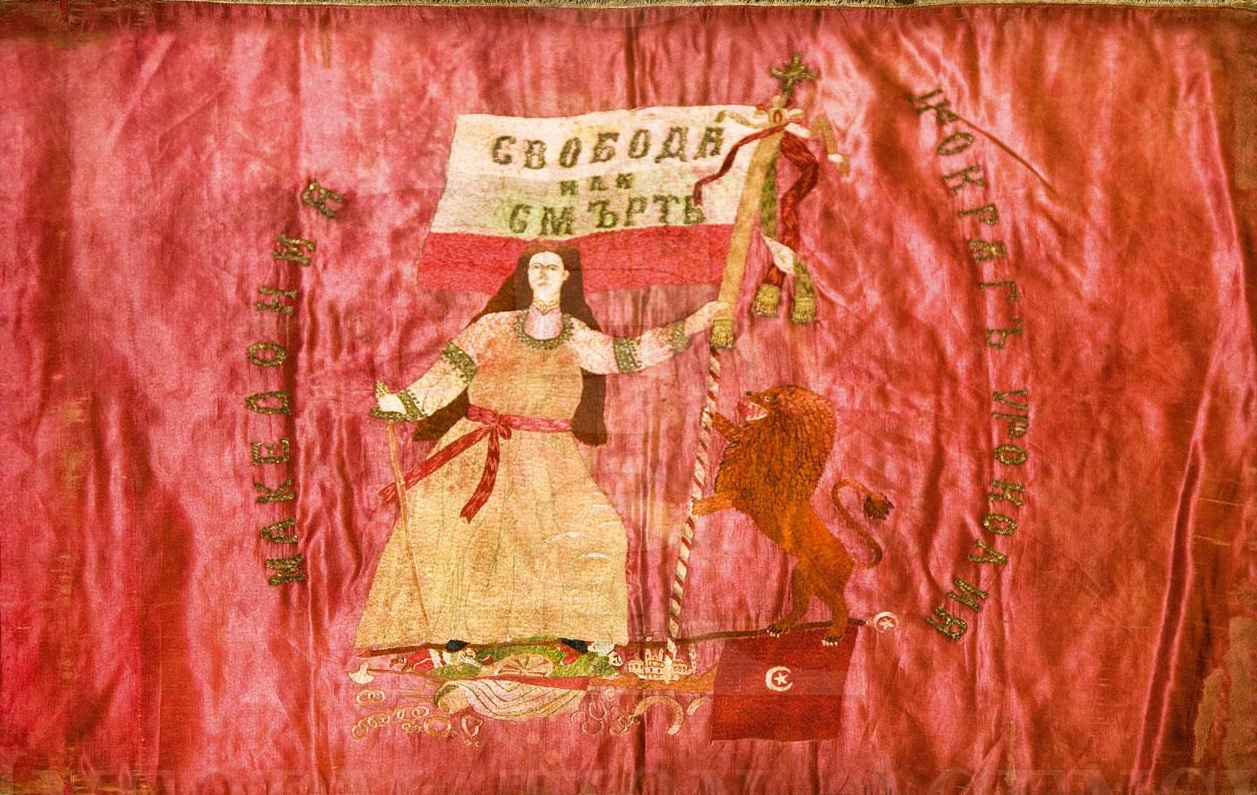
The Ohrid Ilinden Uprising Flag was created by members of the society

The Assumption (Bulgarian: Успение Богородично, romanized: Uspenie Bogorodichno), also known as the Sunday School (Неделното училище, Nedelnoto uchilishte) or Primary School, was an organisation founded at the end of the nineteenth century in Ohrid. The organisation was founded by women teachers to improve Bulgarian language education in the area. The organization became notable when it joined with the Internal Macedonian Revolutionary Organization and supported the Ilinden Uprising.

== History ==
The organization was founded in 1885 in Ohrid. Its main objectives were to provide material and non-material support for the education of the poor and especially women. The Society organizes weekly educational classes and lectures on the emancipation of women under the slogan "When we free Macedonia, women will have the same rights." Among the prominent members of the organization were Vasilka Razmova, Cleo Samardzhieva, Atina Shahova, Poliksena Mosinova and Maria Parmakova. In the autumn of 1900, the company joined the Internal Macedonian Revolutionary Organization and actively participated in the preparation of the Ilenden Uprising in Ohrid under the guidance of teacher Konstantina Boyadzhieva. Members of the merged organization including Poliksena Poppanova and Kostadina Rusinska helped found a hospital at the house used by Metody Patchev who had recently died fighting the Ottomans. They would care for wounded fighters at his house. The Ottoman soldiers discovered the hospital but they could find no charges against the teachers. The teachers were held, interrogated, badly beaten and released. The hospital continued to operate and the local mayor arranged for free milk to assist them. The care of the wounded by the women revolutionaries of Ohrid was the subject of a large painting by Dancho Kal’chev in 1903.
