= March 1902 =

Month in 1902

<<	March 1902					>>
Su	Mo	Tu	We	Th	Fr	Sa
						1
2	3	4	5	6	7	8
9	10	11	12	13	14	15
16	17	18	19	20	21	22
23	24	25	26	27	28	29
30	31

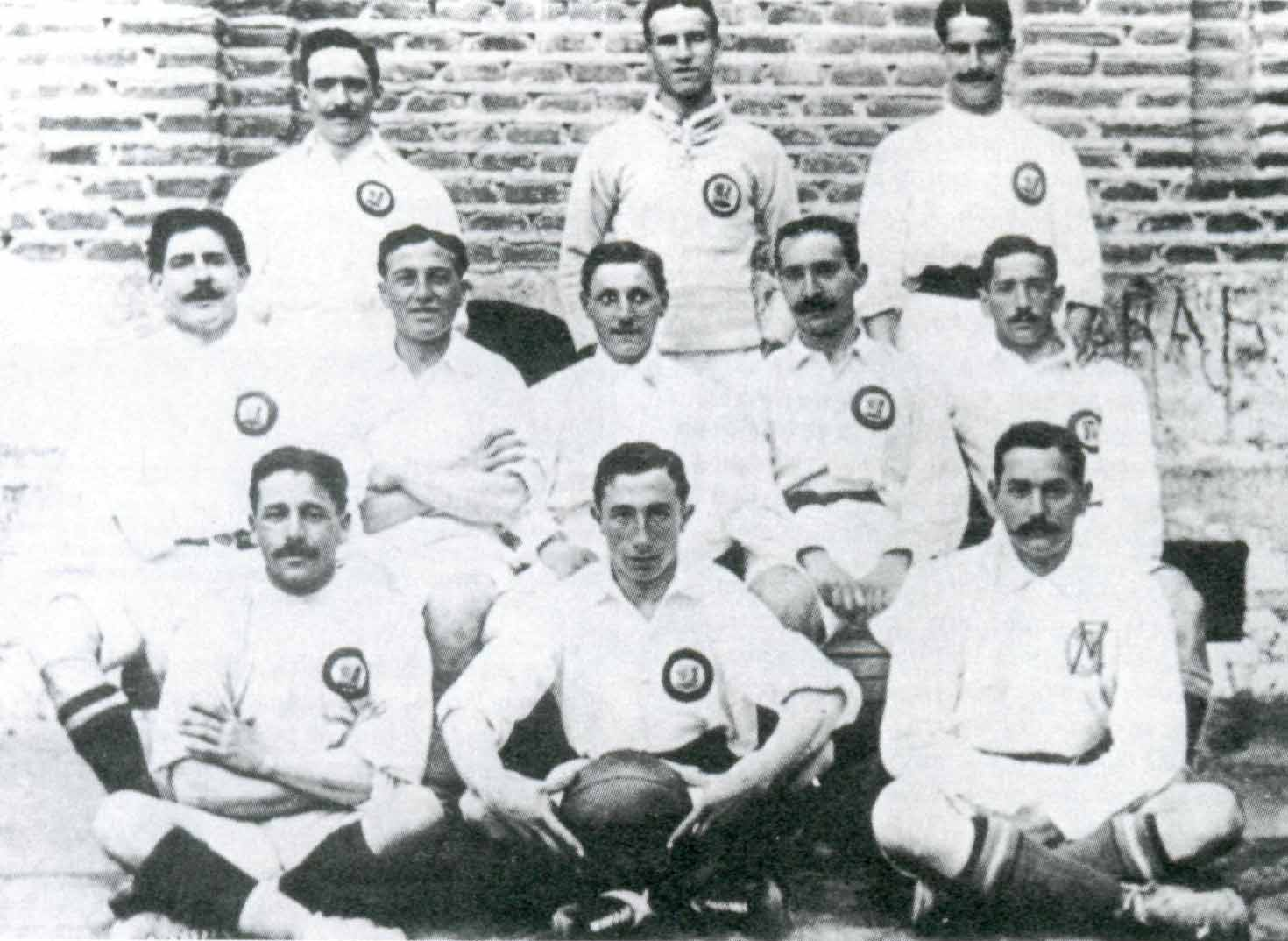
March 6, 1902: Real Madrid F.C. founded in Spain

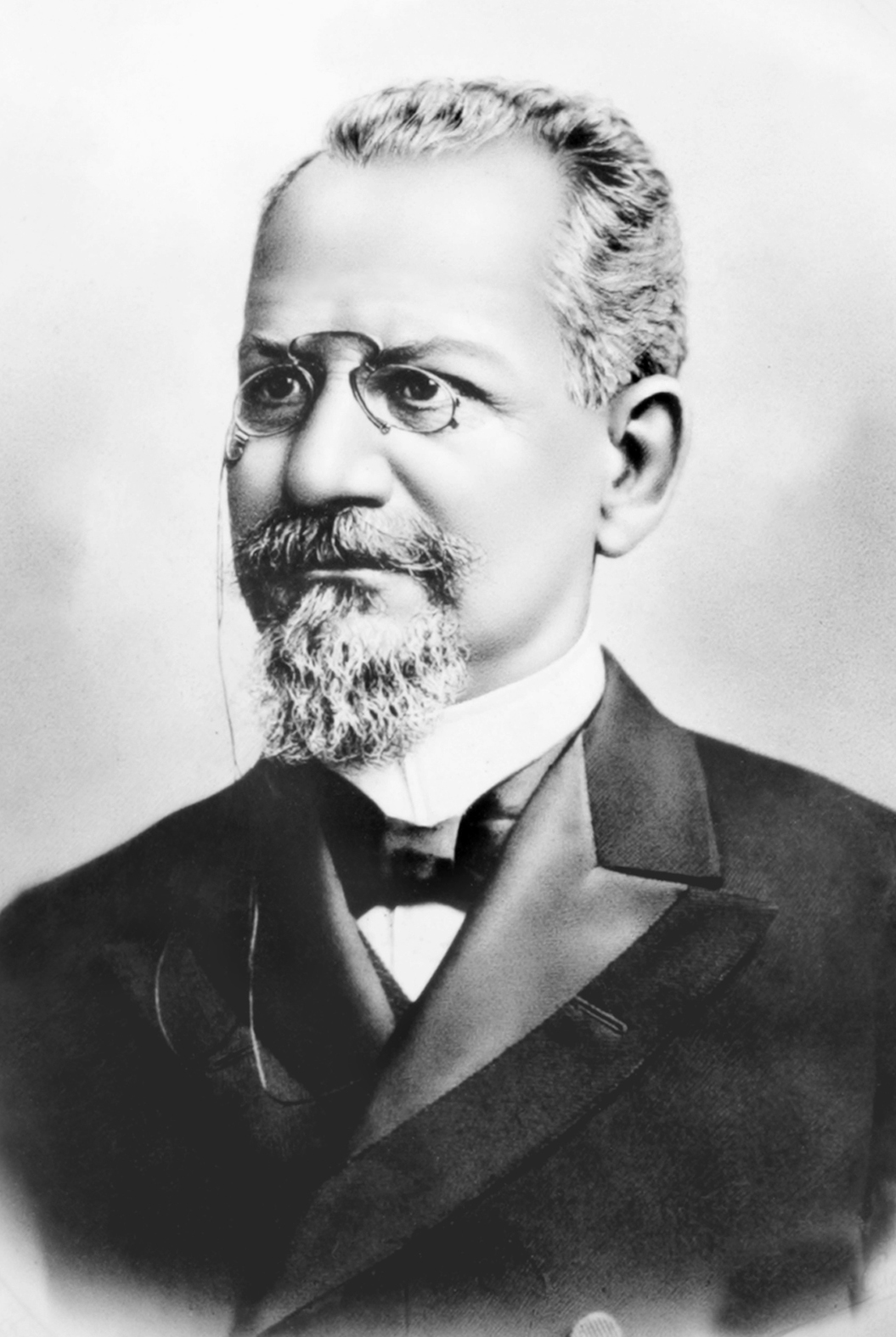
March 1, 1902: Alves elected President of Brazil

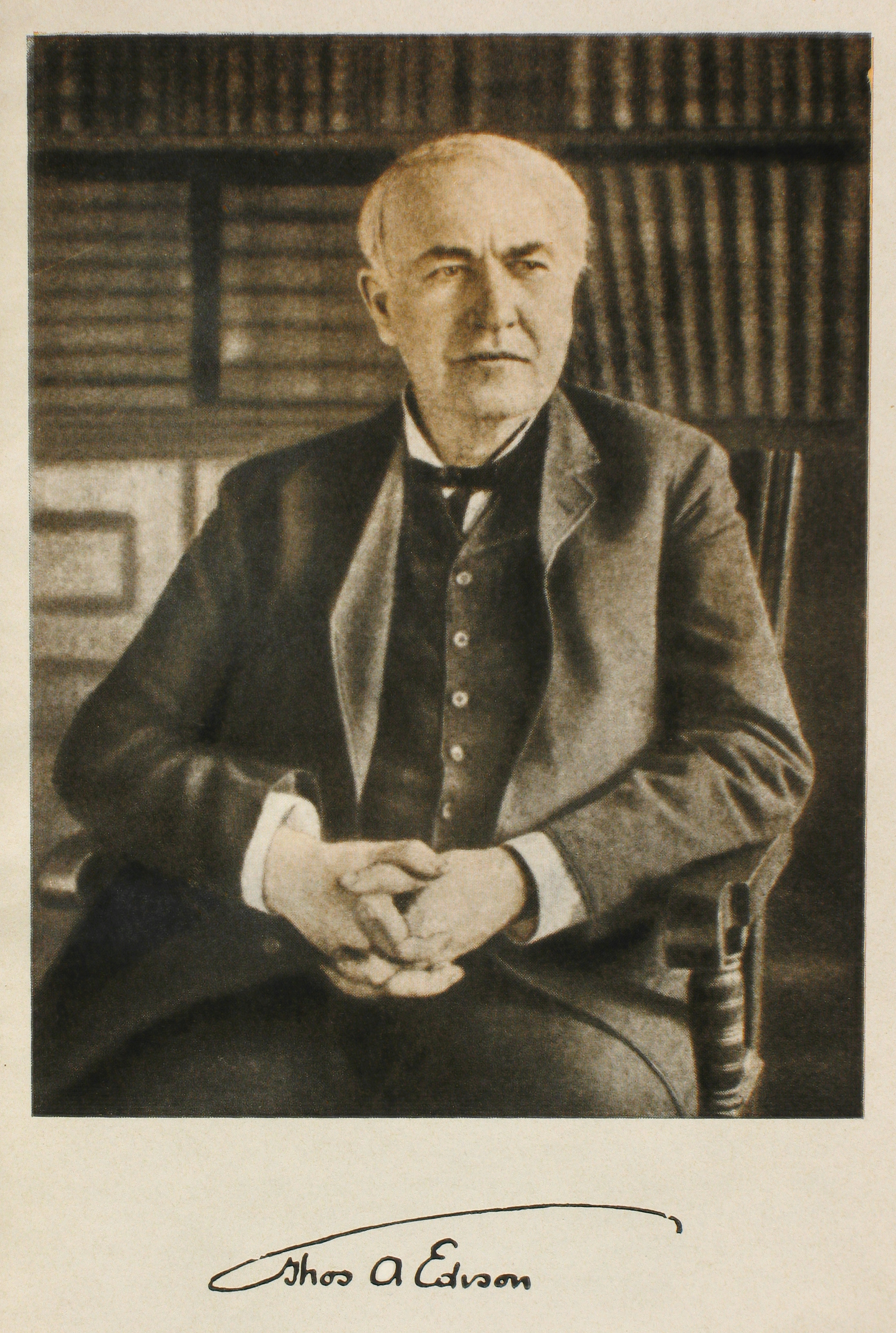
March 10, 1902: Thomas Edison's monopoly on motion pictures ended

The following events occurred in March 1902:

== March 1, 1902 (Saturday) ==
- In Brazil's presidential election, Rodrigues Alves of the Republican Party of São Paulo received 91.7% of the vote. Silviano Brandão, who was elected vice-president, would not live long enough to begin his term of office.
- The Canadian Amateur Hockey League season ended, with Montreal Hockey Club as champions.

== March 2, 1902 (Sunday) ==
- Major Littleton W. T. Waller, and the surviving members of his battalion of U.S. Marines and Filipino civilian assistants, returned to base at Cavite on the island of Luzon, after completing their disastrous march across Samar in the American territory of the Philippines. Major Waller was court martialed on March 17 on charges of murder in the execution of 11 Filipinos but would be acquitted on April 7.
- Sussex, New Jersey, received its current name, inspired by the county of the same name in England, after having been incorporated more than 10 years earlier as Deckertown.
- Born:
  - Edward Condon, American nuclear physicist for whom the Franck–Condon principle of spectroscopy and the Slater–Condon rules of computational chemistry are named; in Alamogordo, New Mexico (d. 1974)
  - Almer "Mike" Monroney, American politician who served as U.S. Representative (1931-1951) and then U.S. Senator (1951-1969) for Oklahoma; in Oklahoma City, Oklahoma Territory (d. 1980)
- Died: Colonel Linnaeus Tripe, 79, British photographer and army officer

== March 3, 1902 (Monday) ==
- American bandit Harry Longabaugh, popularly known as "The Sundance Kid" as partner in crime with Butch Cassidy, began his return to the United States a year after having fled to Argentina. Longabaugh and his girlfriend Etta Place, boarded the ship SS Soldier Prince in Buenos Aires. They would arrive in New York City on April 3 and remain until July 10.
- Born: Allalou (pen name for Ali Sellali), "The Father of Algerian Theatre", Algerian playwright; in Algiers (d. 1992)

== March 4, 1902 (Tuesday) ==
- The United States Department of the Navy ordered the transfer of all U.S. Navy shore properties in Cuba to the control of Governor-General Leonard Wood, who, in turn, would transfer the properties to control of the Republic of Cuba.
- A tidal wave struck the coast of Central America, causing a great loss of life.
- Through the efforts of the National Civic Federation, the strike against National Cash Register was ended in Dayton, Ohio.

== March 5, 1902 (Wednesday) ==
- Ten months after ironworkers had gone on strike in San Francisco, the walkout was settled. Although the demand for a nine-hour workday was not agreed to, the ironworkers received some concessions.
- Died:
  - Leonard Lewisohn, 64, American philanthropist (b. 1847)
  - Benjamin Franklin Stevens, 69, American bibliographer (b. 1833)

== March 6, 1902 (Thursday) ==
- Real Madrid, one of the most valuable professional sports franchises in the world, was founded as Madrid Football Club.
- The Spanish Treaty Claims Commission ruled against American claimants seeking damages for the 1898 destruction of the battleship USS Maine in Havana Harbor.
- Prince Henry of Prussia, on the first state visit by German royalty to the United States, received an honorary doctorate from Harvard University.
- Died:
  - Moritz Kaposi, 64, Hungarian physician and dermatologist who first identified the skin cancer now called Kaposi's sarcoma (b. 1837)
  - Worthy S. Streator, 85, American railroad and coal mining entrepreneur who created the Atlantic and Great Western Railroad and the Vermilion Coal Company. The company town, Streator, Illinois, was named in his honor. (b. 1816)
  - Neil Bryant (Cornelius O'Neill), 72, American minstrel show performer who continued the "Bryant's Minstrels" show into the early 80s after the death of founder Dan Bryant.

== March 7, 1902 (Friday) ==
- The Boers won their last major victory over the British Army of the Second Boer War, at the Battle of Tweebosch. British Army General Paul Sanford Methuen and 200 of his men were forced to surrender to Boer General J. H. de la Rey in the Western Transvaal. General Methuen was wounded, but was quickly released from imprisonment
- A permanent United States Census Bureau was created by law.
- The U.S. steamer Waesland collided with the British steamer Harmonides off the coast of Anglesey, United Kingdom and sank; two passengers were killed.
- Born:
  - Heinz Rühmann, German actor; in Essen (d. 1994)
  - Ernő Schwarz, Hungarian soccer football player; in Budapest (d. 1977)
- Died:
  - Christian Fenger, 61, pioneering American surgeon who refined techniques for the hysterectomy, cleft palate repair, and the safe removal of tumors from the spinal cord (b. 1840)
  - Gaetano Casati, 63, Italian explorer of Africa (b. 1838)
  - Pud Galvin, 45, American baseball player, member of the Baseball Hall of Fame (b. 1856)

== March 8, 1902 (Saturday) ==
- Jean Sibelius's Second Symphony was performed for the first time, premiered by the Helsinki Philharmonic Orchestra in the Grand Duchy of Finland (then part of the Russian Empire) and conducted by Jean Sibelius himself in Helsinki.
- The Charron armoured car went into service for the first time.

== March 9, 1902 (Sunday) ==
- Real Madrid played its first match of soccer football, an intra-squad game between two teams composed of club members. "Club B" beat "Club A", 6 to 0. After reorganization of the squads, a second match was played later in the day with "Club A" winning, 1 to 0, over "Club B".
- Austrian classical music composer Gustav Mahler married pianist and composer Alma Schindler. The two had two children (including sculptor Anna Mahler) and remained together until Mahler's death in 1911.
- Born: Will Geer, American actor known for the TV show The Waltons; in Frankfort, Indiana (d. 1978)

== March 10, 1902 (Monday) ==
- A U.S. circuit court ruling rejected Thomas Edison's bid to have a monopoly on motion picture technology.
- An antitrust suit was filed against the holding company that controls Northern Pacific Railway, Great Northern Railway and Chicago, Burlington and Quincy Railroad.

== March 11, 1902 (Tuesday) ==
- Prince Henry of Prussia departed New York City.
- In the Queensland state election, Robert Philp's Ministerial Party were returned with a reduced majority. It was the first Queensland state election where voting was completed on a single day.
- The lower house of Denmark's Parliament, the Riksdag, ratified the treaty to sell the Danish West Indies to the United States.

== March 12, 1902 (Wednesday) ==
- Debreceni VSC, one of the most successful soccer football teams in Hungary, was founded in the Austro-Hungarian city of Debrecen as Egyetértés Futball Club. It would later be renamed for the Debrecen Railway as Debreceni Vasutas Sport Club.
- Died: John Peter Altgeld, 54, American political reformer and former Governor of Illinois, died after suffering a cerebral hemorrhage during a speech (b. 1847)

== March 13, 1902 (Thursday) ==
- In Monte Carlo in Monaco, Dr. Ernest Guglielminetti made the first paving of a road (from Monaco to the French city of Nice) with his invention of tar-bound macadam, the spraying of tar onto roads already "Macadamized" by paving with crushed stone, as the first effective method of holding down the amount of dust stirred up by motorized vehicles.
- The cargo ship Reporter was wrecked in San Francisco Bay when it crashed into the wreckage of the King Philip, which had been destroyed 24 years earlier on January 25, 1878.
- Born: Mohammed Abdel Wahab, Egyptian singer; in Cairo (d. 1991)

== March 14, 1902 (Friday) ==
- The United States Senate, meeting in executive, closed-door session, unanimously ratified the Hague Peace Conference treaty of 1899.
- Born: Archduke Gottfried of Austria; in Linz (d. 1984)

== March 15, 1902 (Saturday) ==
- The Frick Building, built at the behest of industrialist Henry Clay Frick, opened in Pittsburgh, Pennsylvania. At 20 stories and 330 feet (100 m) high, it was the tallest building in the city of Pittsburgh and would remain so for more than 55 years until surpassed by the 25-story (and 3 feet taller) Hilton Hotel in 1959.
- Born: Carla Porta Musa, Italian essayist and poet; in Como (d. 2012)
- Died: Sir Richard Temple, 76, British colonial administrator who worked at alleviating famine in Bombay in the 19th century (b. 1826)

== March 16, 1902 (Sunday) ==
- Five remaining members of the crew of the barge Wadena, and seven of their eight rescuers from the Monomoy Station, were drowned in a storm when the rescue barge was capsized by a wave off of the coast of Chatham, Massachusetts.

== March 17, 1902 (Monday) ==
- The court-martial began of U.S. Marine Major Littleton W. T. Waller on charges of murder in the execution of 11 Filipino civilians who had disobeyed orders in the march across Samar. He would be acquitted on April 7.
- Born: Bobby Jones, American golfer; in Atlanta (d. 1971)

== March 18, 1902 (Tuesday) ==
- Pope Leo delivered the last papal condemnation of the Freemasons, issuing the encyclical Annum ingressi.
- Joseph Chamberlain, Britain's Colonial Secretary, sent a cable to the Governor General of Canada, the Earl of Minto, asking that Canada commit an additional 2,000 troops to fight alongside the British Army in the Second Boer War. Minto and Canada's Prime Minister Wilfrid Laurier split over whether to honor the British request, but Laurier and his cabinet belatedly committed to supplying the requested men.
- Born: General Siegfried Westphal, German Wehrmacht officer who later served as a prosecution witness at the Nuremberg trials; in Leipzig (d. 1982)
- Died: Cadwallader John Bates, 49, English antiquarian and historian, died of a heart attack (b. 1853)

== March 19, 1902 (Wednesday) ==
- The Ottoman Empire rejected a demand from the United States for reimbursement for the $72,000 ransom paid to Bulgarian rebels for the release of missionaries Ellen Stone and Katerina Cilka.
- Denmark's Volksthing, the upper house of parliament, voted to ratify the treaty selling the Danish West Indies to the United States.
- The Populist Party, which had been a major American third party to rival the Republicans and Democrats during the 1890s, disbanded by merging back to the Democratic Party. At its height in 1897, the Populists had 22 seats in the House of Representatives and five in the Senate.

== March 20, 1902 (Thursday) ==
- John Dillon, an Irish member of the House of Commons of the United Kingdom, was suspended after calling fellow MP Austen Chamberlain a liar. Four days later, the Commons adopted Arthur Balfour's motion that the expulsion be limited to one week.
- Died: Mary E. Pulsifer Ames, 57, American botanist (b. 1845)

== March 21, 1902 (Friday) ==
- Shannon Lass won the 64th Grand National steeplechase at the Aintree Racecourse in Liverpool.
- Born:
  - Al Smith, American cartoonist, as Albert Schmidt in Brooklyn, New York (d. 1986)
  - Son House, American blues musician; in Lyon, Mississippi (d. 1988)

== March 22, 1902 (Saturday) ==
- Thirty-four striking employees of the Rothschild Petroleum Company at Batum were killed by Russian soldiers.
- United States Attorney General Philander C. Knox issued an opinion that the public lands of Puerto Rico were federally-owned United States property.
- Dick Rock, 49, a poacher and animal keeper, was killed by one of his captive American bison near Henrys Lake outside Yellowstone National Park.
- Died: Johnny Ryan, 48, American Major League Baseball outfielder and police officer (Philadelphia Police Department), died of a heart attack while struggling with a prisoner.

== March 23, 1902 (Sunday) ==
- Traveling from Middelburg, South African President Schalk Burger arrived in British-controlled Pretoria under a flag of truce to discuss an end to the Second Boer War.
- Guglielmo Marconi announced that he would establish a wireless telegraph station at Sable Head on Nova Scotia's Cape Breton Island, the easternmost point on North America's Atlantic coast to England.
- Korea's Foreign Minister announced that the Kingdom would have no further relations with Russia's ambassador.
- Died: Kálmán Tisza, 71, Prime Minister of Hungary from 1875 to 1890 (b. 1830)

== March 24, 1902 (Monday) ==
New Zealand

- The Flag of New Zealand became standardized after more than 32 years, with royal assent being given to the New Zealand Ensign Act 1901 (No. 74) by King Edward VII of the British Empire.
- In New York City, 43-year-old Roebling Company ironworker George Shauer fell 168 feet (51 m) from the new Williamsburg Bridge into the East River and drowned.
- Born: Thomas E. Dewey, American politician who was the Republican Party nominee for President of the United States in 1944 and 1948; in Owosso, Michigan (d. 1971)
- Died: Salomon Mandelkern, 72, Ukrainian Jewish poet and author (b. 1846)

== March 25, 1902 (Tuesday) ==
- The United States House of Representatives voted to remove Democratic Congressman John Stockdale Rhea of Kentucky from office after determining that Republican J. McKenzie Moss had won the 1900 election. Moss was sworn in, but would be defeated for re-election by Rhea in November.
- Leonard Wood, the U.S. Governor-General of Cuba, was directed by President Theodore Roosevelt to transfer administration of the island to the government of the new Republic of Cuba on May 20.

== March 26, 1902 (Wednesday) ==
- Russian novelist Maxim Gorky's first play, The Philistines (Meschane), premiered at the Moscow Art Theatre under the direction of Konstantin Stanislavski and Vasily Luzhsky.
- American lawyer Albert T. Patrick was convicted of the 1900 murder of one of his clients and sentenced to executed in the electric chair at New York's Sing Sing maximum security penitentiary. Patrick's appeal delayed the carrying out of the death penalty and his sentence would be commuted in 1906 by the Governor to life imprisonment, followed by a pardon in 1912 by another New York governor. The former death row inmate would return to the practice of law but be disbarred in 1930.
- Died: Cecil Rhodes, 48, a British businessman who was one of the wealthiest men in the world, died from heart disease. He had moved to southern Africa because of his health problems, and built his fortune as the owner of the mines of the British South Africa Company and served as Prime Minister of the Cape Colony from 1890 to 1896. His company established the southern African territory of Rhodesia (which later became Zimbabwe and Zambia). In his will, he funded the Rhodes Scholarship that has provided scholarships to the University of Oxford for thousands of international students.

== March 27, 1902 (Thursday) ==
- Queen Alexandra's Royal Army Nursing Corps was established in the British Army, with Queen Alexandra as its first President, with the signing of a Royal Warrant by her husband, King Edward VII.
- Died: Charles Petre Eyre, 84, Roman Catholic Archbishop of Glasgow since 1878 (b. 1817)

== March 28, 1902 (Friday) ==
- Delegates to the constitutional convention for a new state constitution for Virginia voted to adopt three provisions to deter African-American voting. In addition to a poll tax of $1.50 starting in 1904, existing voters were to be subjected to a "literacy test" of reading, understanding and explaining a section. American Civil War veterans, however, were exempt from the test, as were their sons, setting an example of a "grandfather clause" that would be emulated by other southern states.
- Born: Dame Flora Robson, 82, English actress; in South Shields, County Durham (d. 1984)
- Died: Georg Herbert Münster, 81, Germany's ambassador to the United Kingdom from 1873 to 1885, and France from 1885 to 1900 (b. 1820)

== March 29, 1902 (Saturday) ==
- Although U.S. senators were elected by their state senates rather than by the public prior to 1913, the party nominees for the state senate to choose from were chosen in a party primary election. In Arkansas, incumbent U.S. Senator James Kimbrough Jones lost to his challenger for the Democratic Party nomination, white supremacist and former Governor James Paul Clarke.
- Bulgaria's government expelled U.S. diplomat Charles M. Dickinson as persona non grata for his comments regarding the case of missionary Ellen Stone.
- Born:
  - William Walton, English composer; in Oldham, Lancashire (d. 1983)
  - Marcel Aymé, French writer, in Joigny, Yonne département (d. 1967)
- Died: Sir Andrew Clarke, 77, British Army lieutenant general and colonial administrator. He served as Governor of Singapore and later as Governor of the Straits Settlements which included Singapore, and the Malaysian states of Malacca, Dinding, and Penang.

== March 30, 1902 (Sunday) ==
- The 1902 Paris–Roubaix cycle race was won by Lucien Lesna.
- Born: Brooke Astor, American socialite and philanthropist; in Portsmouth, New Hampshire (d. 2007)

== March 31, 1902 (Monday) ==
- The first national meeting of the American Philosophical Association began, at a gathering at Columbia University, and was chaired by James Edwin Creighton.
- Died: A. W. Ogilvie, 72, Canadian businessman who created the largest flour milling company in the British Empire (b. 1829)
