= Keef–Filley Building =

- U.S. National Register of Historic Places
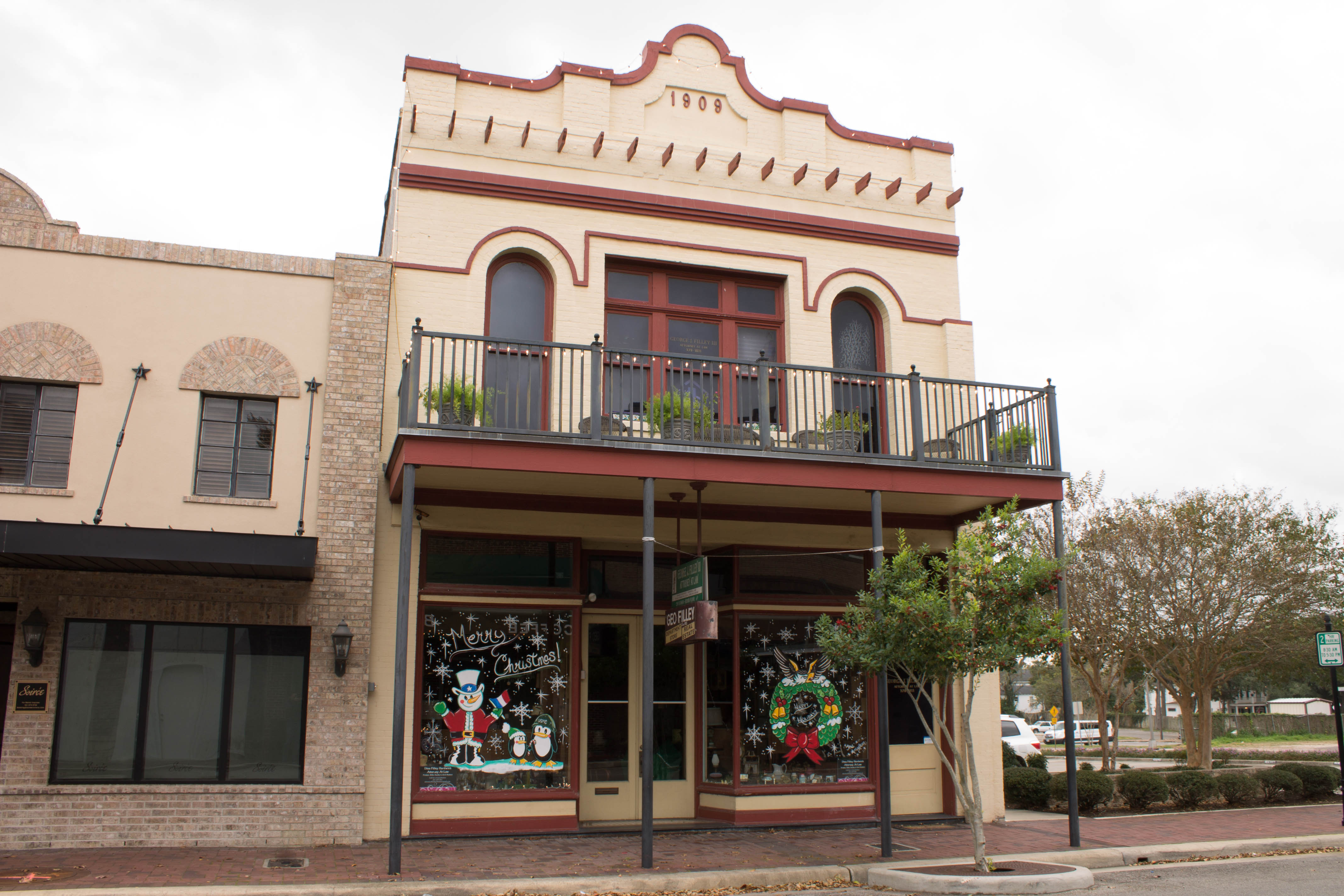
- Keef–Filley Building in 2015

- Location within Texas Location within the United States
- Location: 214 S. Main, Victoria, Texas
- Coordinates: 28°47′50″N 97°0′22″W
- Area: less than one acre
- Built: 1909
- Built by: Bailey Mills
- MPS: Victoria MRA
- NRHP reference No.: 86002612
- Added to NRHP: March 24, 1987

The Keef–Filley Building at 214 S. Main in Victoria, Texas was built in 1909. It was a work of building contractor firm Bailey Mills. It was listed on the National Register of Historic Places in 1987.

It has brick walls and a wood roof & floors system, and a flat roof made of built-up tar and gravel. It has a Mission Revival-style parapet with vigas extending. It has a three-bay one-story porch.

It was listed on the NRHP as part of a study which listed numerous historic resources in the Victoria area.

== See also ==
- National Register of Historic Places listings in Victoria County, Texas
