= Charles Praeger =

American architect

Charles Emil Praeger, Sr. (August 18, 1877 – January 3, 1940) was an American architect from Victoria, Texas. He worked for part of his career in partnership with architect James Hull as Praeger & Hull and Hull & Praeger. He was also in partnership with architect Sam H. Dixon, Jr., as Praeger & Dixon. He was born in Victoria, Texas. In June 1909, he married Bertha Christine "Berdie" Haller, and they had two children, Bertha Christine Praeger and Charles Eustace Praeger, both born in 1910.

A number of Praeger's works are listed on the U.S. National Register of Historic Places. These works, all in Victoria, Texas, include:

- Frank Alonso House (Charles Praeger)
- F. H. Crain House (1915) (Praeger & Dixon)
- Fleming-Welder House (Hull & Praeger)
- E. J. Jecker House (Praeger & Hull)
- E. C. Kaufman House (Hull & Praeger)
- Lander-Hopkins House (1910) (James Hull and Charles Praeger)
- McCan-Nave House (1908) (Charles Praeger)
- Tasin House (1911) (Praeger & Hull)
