= Dr. L.W. and Martha E.S. Chilton House =

Historic house in Texas, United States

- U.S. National Register of Historic Places
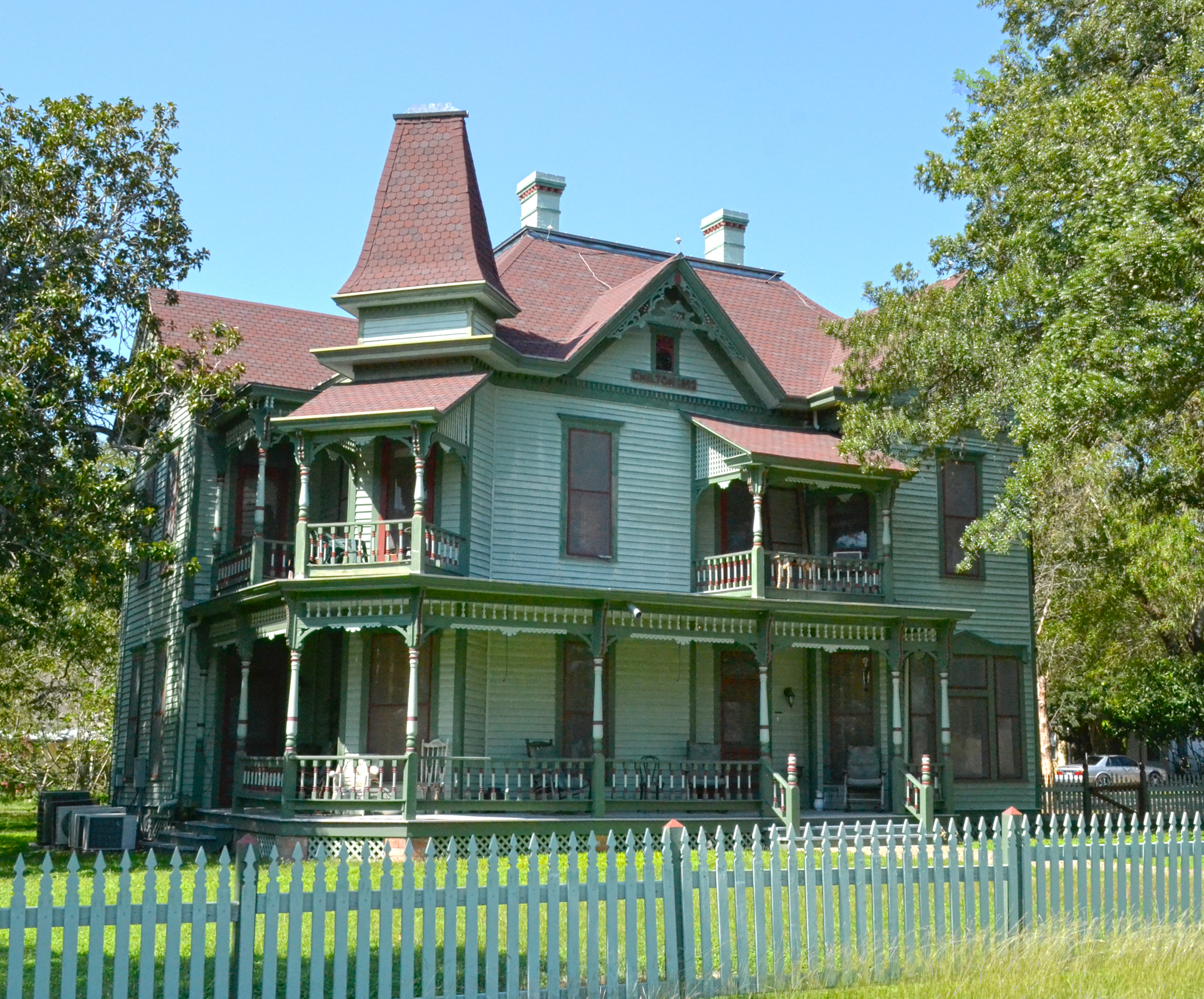
- Chilton House in 2012

- Location within Texas Location within the United States
- Location: 242 N. Chilton St., Goliad, Texas
- Coordinates: 28°40′12″N 97°23′38″W
- Area: less than one acre
- Built: 1902
- Built by: Bailey Mills
- Architect: Jules Leffland
- Architectural style: Queen Anne
- NRHP reference No.: 98000354
- Added to NRHP: April 9, 1998

The Dr. L.W. and Martha E.S. Chilton House at 242 N. Chilton St. in Goliad, Texas, United States, was built in 1902. It was a work of architect Jules Leffland and of building contractor Bailey Mills. It was listed on the National Register of Historic Places in 1998. The listing included two contributing buildings and two contributing structures.

It is a two-and-a-half-story Queen Anne style house. It was expanded by a kitchen/bathroom addition in 1925. A carriage house is an additional contributing building on the property, and it has a cistern on its rear porch and an underground storm shelter.

A tornado on May 18, 1902, killed 114 people, ten percent of Goliad's population, and injured 225, and destroyed housing including the home of Dr. Chilton and family. The daughter was actually lifted up in the vortex of the tornado but survived. Dr. Chilton opened a temporary hospital and morgue in the courthouse.

The house's construction was begun in June 1902 and it was completed in September 1902. The house stayed in the Chilton family until 1997.

== See also ==
- National Register of Historic Places listings in Goliad County, Texas
- Recorded Texas Historic Landmarks in Goliad County
