= Konstantina Rusinska =

Bulgarian teacher, feminist and revolutionary

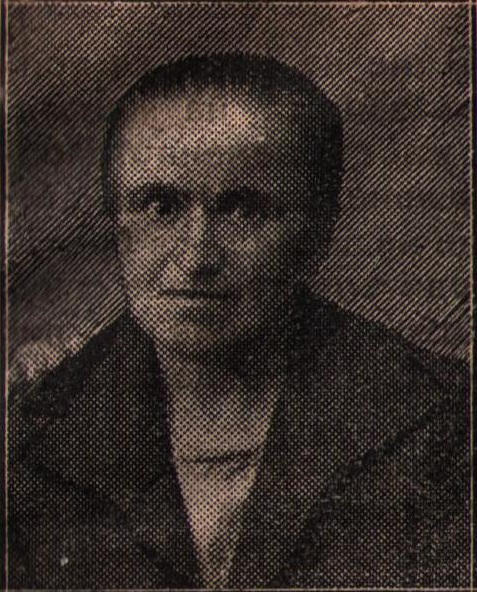
- Born: 1880; Ohrid, Manastir Vilayet, Ottoman Empire (now North Macedonia)
- Died: 1932 (aged 51–52); Sofia, Kingdom of Bulgaria
- Occupation: Teacher
- Known for: Revolution and women's rights
- Children: 4

Konstantina Evtimova Nasteva Boyadzhieva-Rusinska (Bulgarian: Константина Евтимова Настева Бояджиева-Русинска; 1880–1932) was a Bulgarian teacher, feminist and revolutionary.

== Life ==
Rusinska was born in Ohrid in 1880. She was an only child and attended both primary and secondary school. Konstantina's family were Christians, so they had no rights within the Ottoman empire. Somewhere around 1900 she started to teach at the local primary school for Bulgarians. She joined the Internal Macedonian Revolutionary Organization and by 1901 was the head of the woman's section. She held this position until the start of 1904. The women's section had previously been The Assumption society from 1885. The socialists attracted women members as they were in favour of women's rights. Rusinska was able to make political connections.

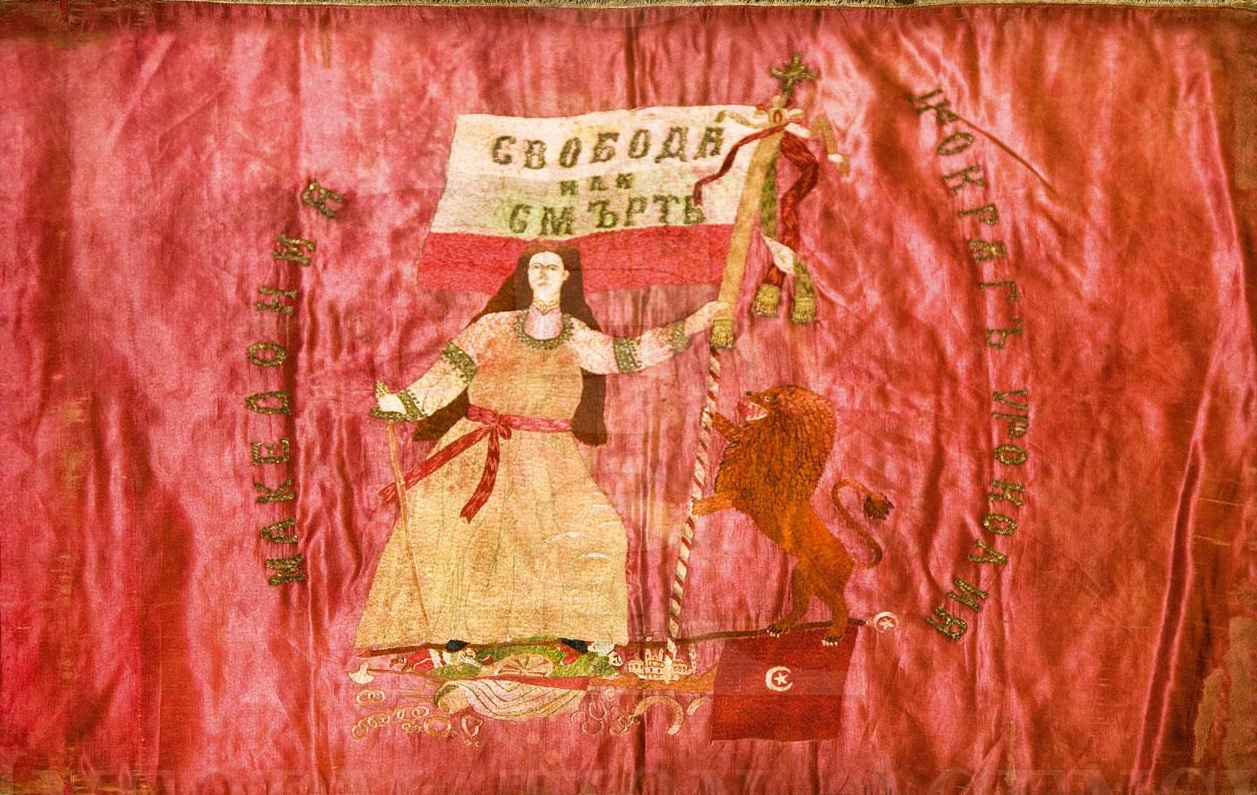
The Ohrid Ilinden-Preobrazhenie Uprising Flag was created by Rusinska and three other teachers

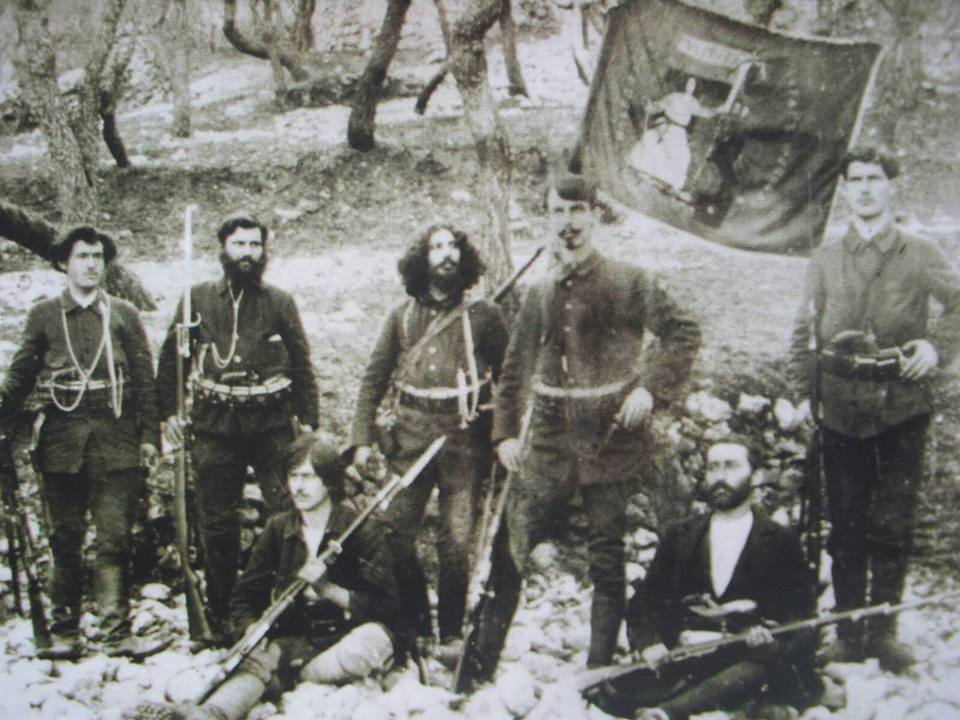
The flag in use

Rusinska helped found a hospital at the house used by Metody Patchev, who had recently died fighting the Ottomans. They cared for wounded fighters at his house. The Ottoman soldiers discovered the hospital but they could find no charges against the teachers. The teachers were held, interrogated, badly beaten and released. The hospital continued to operate and the local mayor arranged for free milk to assist them.

In 1902 Rusinska married revolutionary Nikola Rusinski. Rusinski took part in the unsuccessful Ilinden–Preobrazhenie Uprising. During the uprising, Rusinska and three other teachers created the battle flag of the Ohrid IMARO showing a young woman and a lion stepping onto the Ottoman flag and waving a Bulgarian flag with the words "Freedom or Death" in Bulgarian on it. After the unsuccessful uprising, the two were not arrested, but moved to Bulgaria where Rusinska returned to teaching in the village of Skravena. They had three children. The Balkan Wars morphed into the First World War, and whilst her husband volunteered to fight as Bulgarian soldier in the Maleshevo region, she again taught children, this time in Berovo, until 1918.

The end of the war did not achieve their political ambitions, and the area was ceded again to Serbia. In 1920 her husband supported a communist candidate, which made them return to Bulgaria in 1921. Here they lived in poverty and illness. Her husband worked as a carpenter whilst she taught and coped with pneumonia. Their fourth child died just after birth. Their daughter Roza died after years of tuberculosis when she was seventeen. They could not afford to treat Rusinska's pneumonia. Rusinska died in 1932.
