= Tasin House =

Historic house in Texas, United States

- U.S. National Register of Historic Places
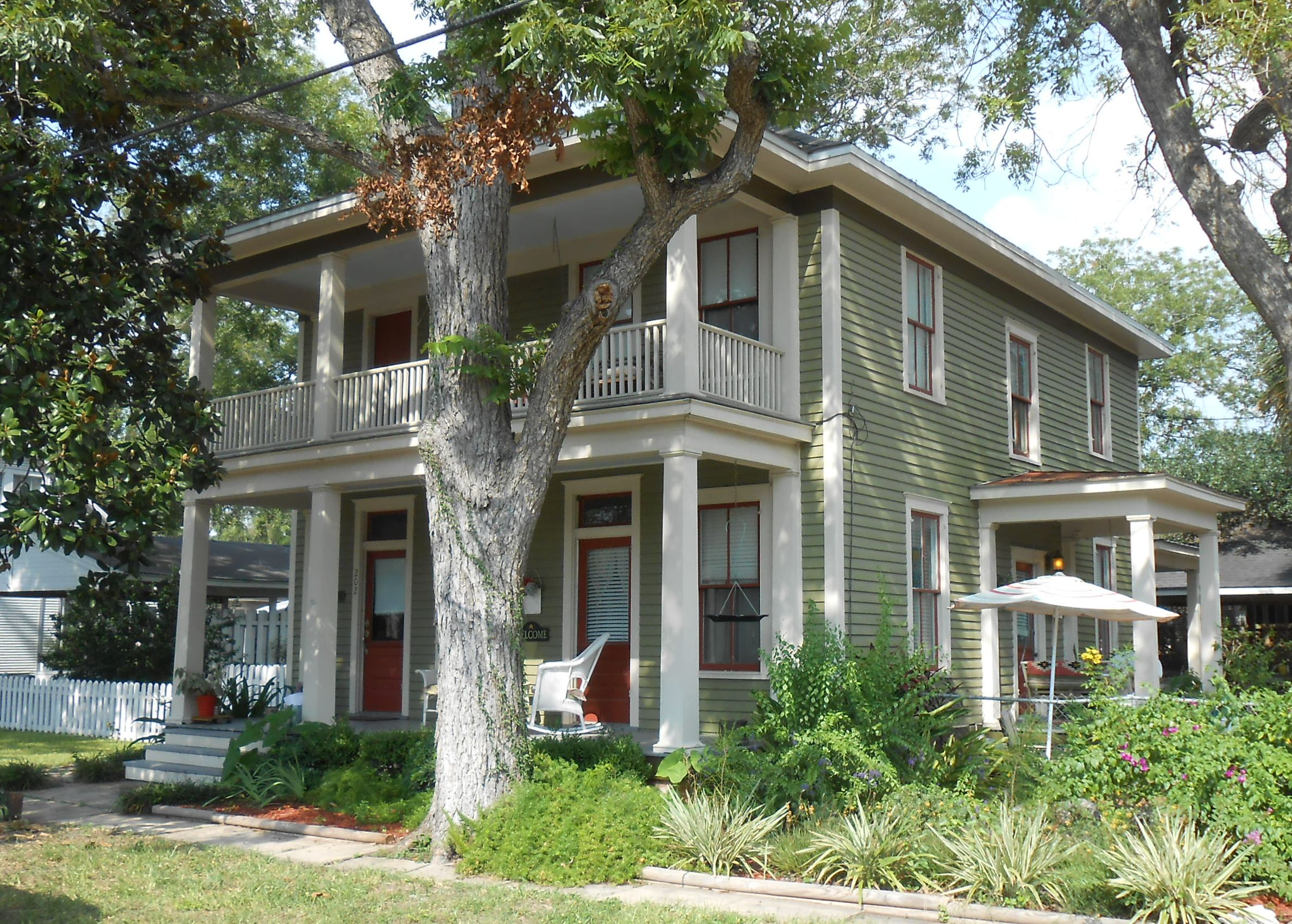
- Tasin House in 2014

- Location within Texas Location within the United States
- Location: 202 N. Wheeler, Victoria, Texas
- Coordinates: 28°47′55″N 97°0′4″W
- Area: less than one acre
- Built: 1911
- Built by: Bailey Mills
- Architect: Praeger & Hull
- MPS: Victoria MRA
- NRHP reference No.: 86002536
- Added to NRHP: December 9, 1986

The Tasin House at 202 N. Wheeler in Victoria, Texas was built in 1911 by building contractors Bailey Mills. It was designed by Praeger & Hull. It was listed on the National Register of Historic Places in 1986.

It is a two-story vernacular house with an "imposing" two-story porch. It has some tapered box columns.

It was listed on the NRHP as part of a study which listed numerous historic resources in the Victoria area.

== See also ==
- National Register of Historic Places listings in Victoria County, Texas
