= Randall Building (Victoria, Texas) =

- U.S. National Register of Historic Places
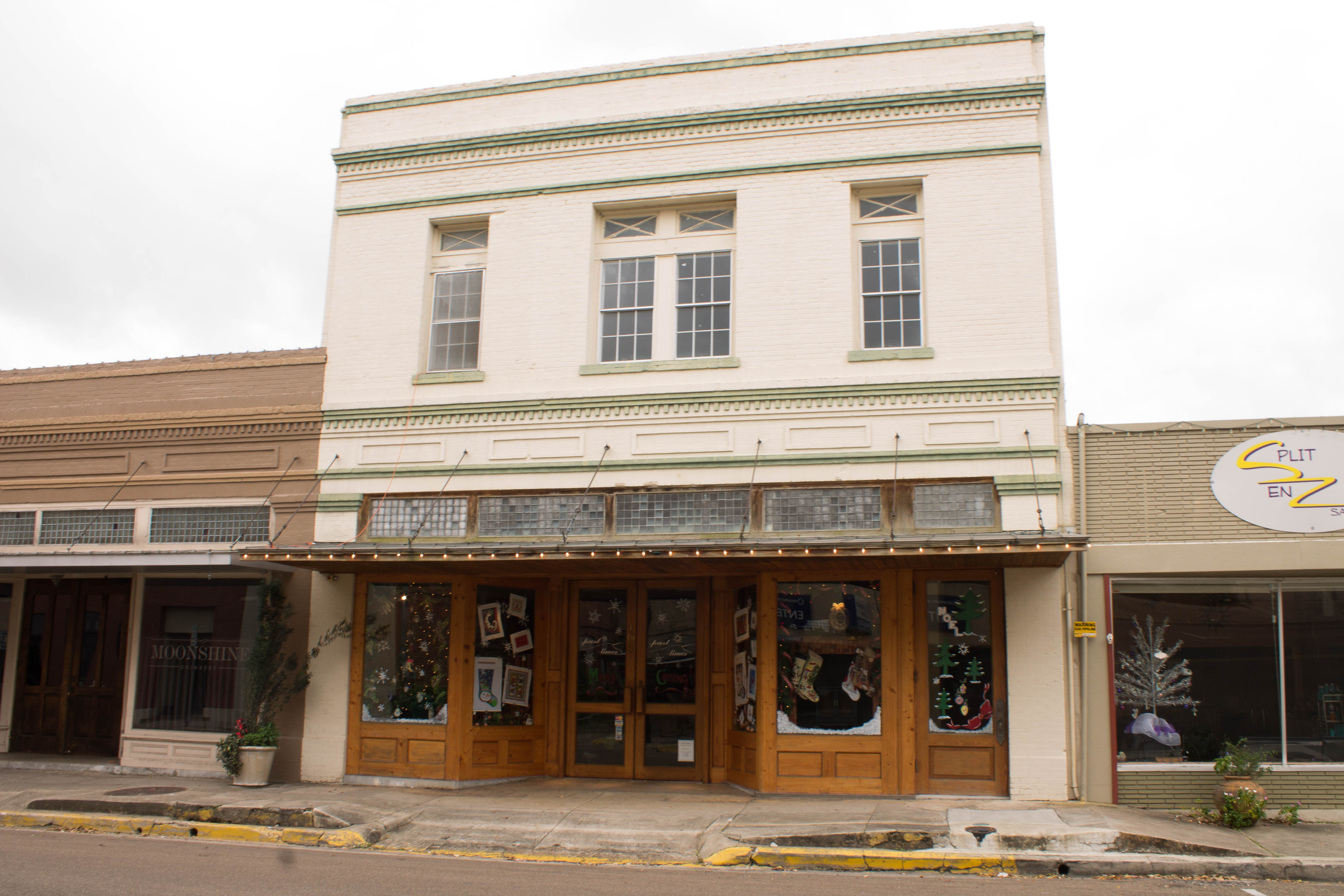
- Randall Building in 2015

- Location within Texas Location within the United States
- Location: 103-105 W. Santa Rosa, Victoria, Texas
- Coordinates: 28°47′53″N 97°0′24″W
- Area: less than one acre
- Built: 1910
- Built by: Bailey Mills
- MPS: Victoria MRA
- NRHP reference No.: 86002560
- Added to NRHP: December 9, 1986

The Randall Building at 103-105 W. Santa Rosa, Victoria, Texas was built in c.1910 by the Bailey Mills contracting firm. It was listed on the National Register of Historic Places in 1986.

It is a commercial building with structural brick walls and with wood floor and roof systems. Its roof is built-up tar and gravel. It has a raised brick parapet and a denticulated brick cornice. Its east portion is a one-story and the rest is two-story. Its second story was used by the local Knights of Columbus as their meeting hall, and the first floor was for businesses. The one-story portion of the building was the Victoria Hardware Company for many years, then auto supply stores.

It was listed on the NRHP as part of a study which listed numerous historic resources in the Victoria area.

== See also ==
- National Register of Historic Places listings in Victoria County, Texas
