= E. J. Jecker House =

Historic house in Texas, United States

- U.S. National Register of Historic Places
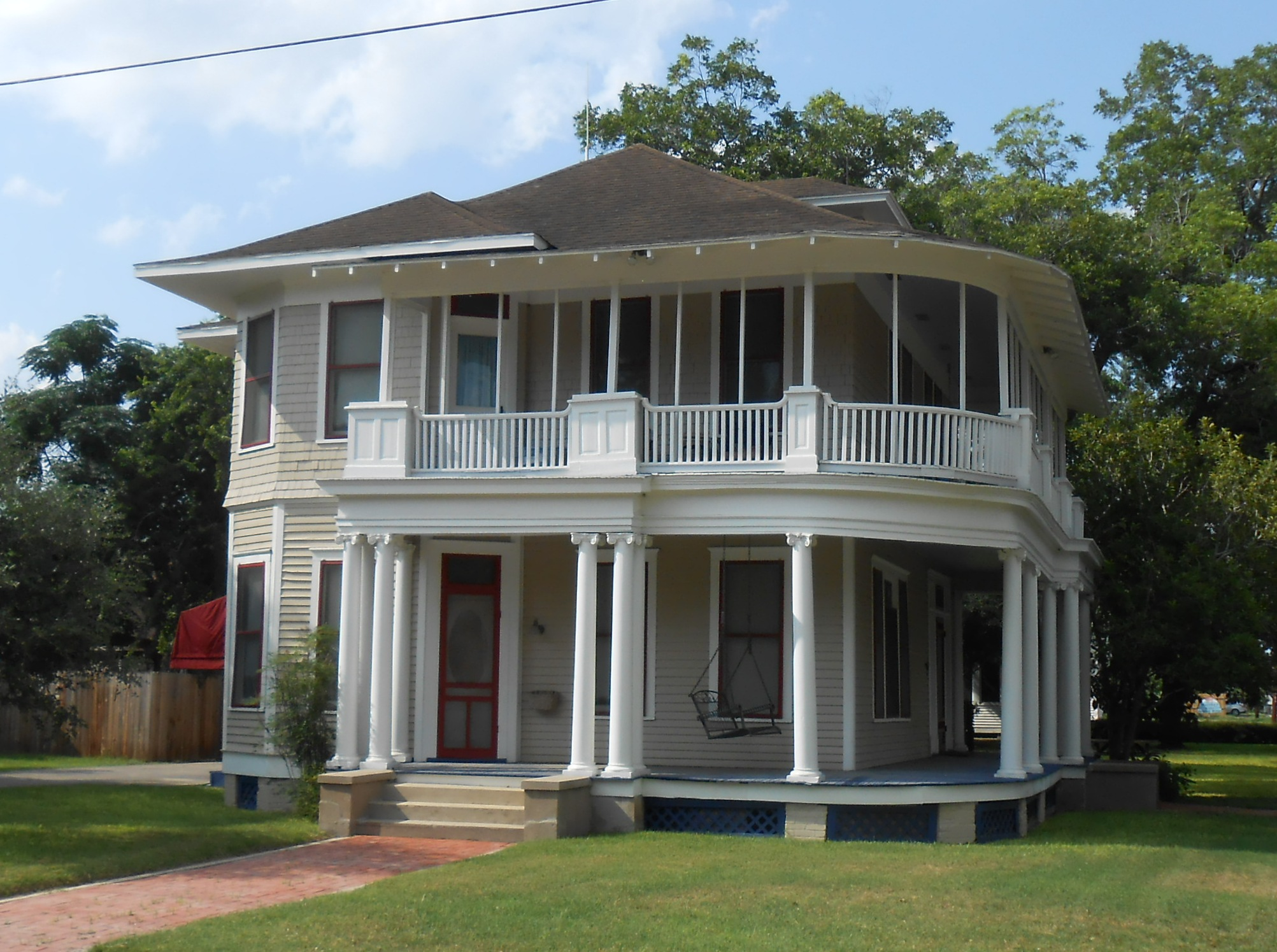
- E. J. Jecker House in 2014

- Location within Texas Location within the United States
- Location: 201 N. Wheeler, Victoria, Texas
- Coordinates: 28°47′55″N 97°0′6″W
- Area: less than one acre
- Built: 1910
- Built by: Bailey Mills
- Architect: Praeger & Hull
- Architectural style: Classical Revival
- MPS: Victoria MRA
- NRHP reference No.: 86002539
- Added to NRHP: December 9, 1986

The E. J. Jecker House at 201 N. Wheeler in Victoria, Texas, United States, was built in 1910. It was a work of architects Praeger & Hull and of building contractor Bailey Mills. It was listed on the National Register of Historic Places in 1986.

It is an L-plan residence with Ionic columns on the first-floor level of its two-story wraparound porch.

It was a home of one of the 2,124 German-speaking immigrants from Alsace-Lorraine brought to Texas by Henri Castro in the 1840s.

It was listed on the NRHP as part of a study which listed numerous historic resources in the Victoria area.

== See also ==
- National Register of Historic Places listings in Victoria County, Texas
