= Bailey Mills =

Bailey Mills was a building contractor firm in Victoria, Texas, USA. It was first known as Bailey Brothers Planing Mill. The firm was founded in 1888 by brothers Samuel M. Bailey and Ira P. Bailey, both originally from Michigan. It operated until 1917. According to a study of historic resources in Victoria, the firm "erected some of Victoria's most important commercial and institutional buildings".

== Operation ==
A number of the firm's works are listed on the U.S. National Register of Historic Places.

Company's works include:

- Dr. L.W. and Martha E.S. Chilton House, 242 N. Chilton St. Goliad, TX (Mills, Bailey), NRHP-listed
- E. J. Jecker House, 201 N. Wheeler Victoria, TX (Mills, Bailey), NRHP-listed
- Keef-Filley Building, 214 S. Main Victoria, TX (Mills, Bailey), NRHP-listed
- Randall Building, 103-105 W. Santa Rosa Victoria, TX (Mills, Bailey), NRHP-listed
- Saint Mary's Catholic Church, 101 W. Church Victoria, TX (Mills, Bailey), NRHP-listed
- Tasin House, 202 N. Wheeler Victoria, TX (Mills, Bailey), NRHP-listed
