= 1902 Goliad tornado =

Weather event in Texas, United States

1902 Goliad, Texas, tornado
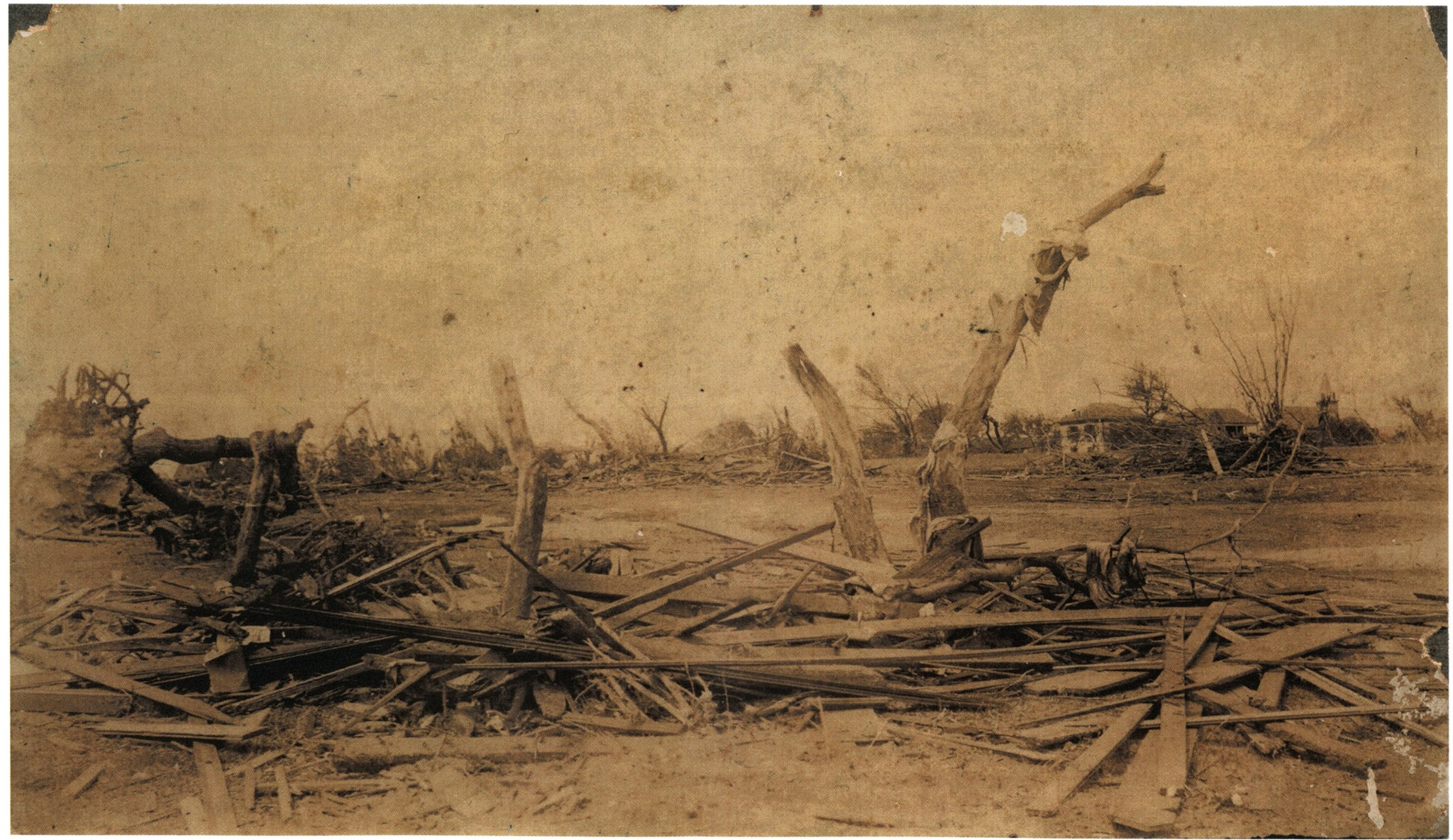
- Violent damage after the tornado

Meteorological history
- Formed: May 18, 1902

F4 equiv. tornado

Overall effects
- Fatalities: 114
- Injuries: ≥279
- Damage: $125,000 (1902 USD)
- Areas affected: Goliad, Texas, US

The 1902 Goliad, Texas, tornado was a F4 tornado that struck the town of Goliad, Texas, United States, on Sunday, May 18, 1902. A total of 114 people died, 250 were injured, and $125,000 damage occurred. Inflation adjusted puts it at $3.4 million.

== Storm development and track ==
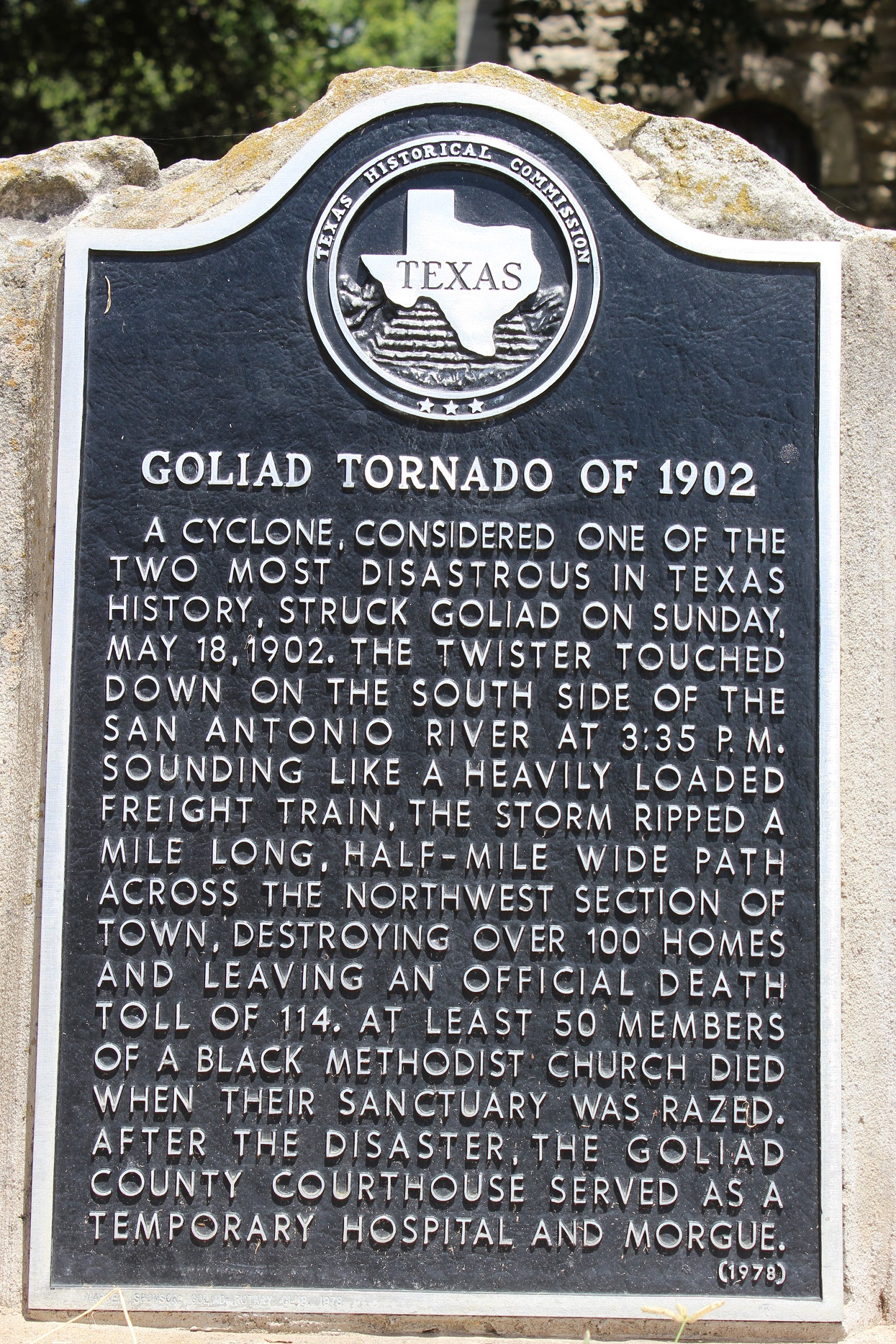
Historical marker remembering the Goliad tornado of 1902 (Darrylpearson)

During May 17 to 19, thunderstorms occurred from the lower Missouri Valley to Texas. On the 18th at 12:15pm, the Galveston weather office issued a special warning of "Squalls, with brisk and occasionally high winds are indicated for the west gulf this afternoon and to-night." That afternoon, Beeville, which is 30 miles to the southwest of Goliad, had considerable damage by high winds. The tornado is believed to have first touched down near Berclair, about 15 miles southwest of Goliad, and moved toward the northeast.

The tornado was on the south side of town, across the San Antonio River about 3:35 p.m. It continued traveling northeast and wrecked the steel bridge across the river at San Patricio Street. The tornado then destroyed the filled Fannin Street Methodist Church at Mt. Auburn Street, killing about 50 people. It went on to destroy the brick factory. Witness Browne reported it sounded like a "million-ton [train] engine". The tornado was a couple of blocks wide when it moved up the west side of town destroying more homes, businesses and churches. The tornado path was 1/8 to 1/2 mile wide and traveled for about a mile. Reports say the tornado lasted only 5 minutes.

== Aftermath ==
Within a few hours, 85 people were reported dead and 29 more over the next several days. Across the city, 150 homes, 100 businesses, a Baptist church and parsonage, a black Methodist church, a white Methodist church, and the second story of the county courthouse were destroyed. At least 50 people were in the black church, none survived.

Dr. Louis Warren Chilton, a young doctor whose wife was injured and whose daughter was lifted into the tornado funnel but survived, set up a temporary hospital and morgue in the first floor of the county courthouse. The Dr. L.W. and Martha E.S. Chilton House was built starting in June and included an underground shelter.

After the tornado, several dozen were buried in a communal grave along the eastern border of Lott Cemetery.

At the time, it was the fourth deadliest tornado in the United States and the worst in Texas history. The Waco tornado of May 11, 1953 tied as the deadliest in Texas history and is now eleventh overall in the United States.
