= Metody Patchev =

Bulgarian revolutionary (1875–1902)

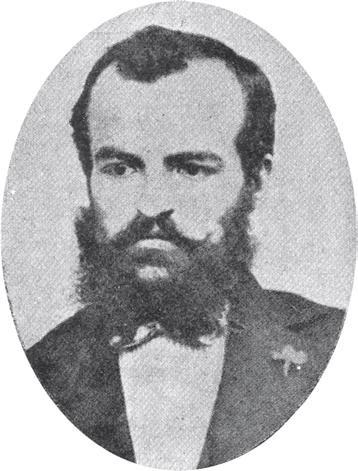
- Born: May 7, 1875; Ohrid, Ottoman Empire
- Died: April 7, 1902 (aged 26); Kadino Selo, Ottoman Empire

Metody Patchev (Bulgarian: Методи Патчев; Macedonian: Методија Патчев; May 7, 1875 – April 7, 1902) was a Bulgarian teacher and revolutionary, voivode of the Internal Macedonian Revolutionary Organization.

== Life ==
Patchev was born in Ohrid, Ottoman Empire (today North Macedonia) in 1875. As a young man he moved to Plovdiv in Bulgaria to apply for work in a leather production company. When he arrived back to Ohrid, he became a Bulgarian Exarchate teacher in 1896. Patchev joined a secret society commonly known as Internal Macedonian Revolutionary Organization (IMRO). On August 5, 1898, Dimitar Grdanov, a Serbian teacher in Ohrid, and pro-Serbian activist in Macedonia, was murdered by him, after which he and his fellow conspirators Hristo Uzunov, Cyril Parlichev and Ivan Grupchev were arrested. He stayed in Ottoman prison until 1901. After his release he applied as a teacher in the town of Prilep, but was unsuccessful due to his times in prison previously. Later rejoining IMRO, he became involved in a cheta group under the command of Marko Lerinski. On April 7, 1902, he entered the village of Kadino Selo with six other revolutionaries unaware of the situation in Kadino Selo he went into an ambush. The Ottoman troops within the village, were under attack from a small group of revolutionaries. After fierce fighting in the village and surroundings, Patchev killed his friends and committed suicide.

After his death, his unoccupied house was used as a secret hospital. Local female teachers including Kostadina Bojadjeva helped wounded fighters at the building. The Ottomans discovered the hospital but could find no charges against the teachers. They were held, interrogated, beaten and released. The hospital continued to operate and the local mayor arranged for free milk to assist them.

In 1904 in Philadelphia, Pennsylvania, a group of Bulgarian immigrants established the Macedonian-Adrianople Charitable Society "Metody Patchev". To the death of Patchev and his comrades, Hristo Silyanov dedicated his poem "Kadino Village Heroes", published in 1904 in Bulgarian.
