= Kadino Selo, Prilep =

Kadino Selo Кадино Село
- Village
- Location within North Macedonia
- Country: North Macedonia
- Region: Pelagonia
- Municipality: Prilep
- Elevation: 613 m (2,011 ft)

Population (2021)
  - Total: 237
- Time zone: UTC+1 (CET)
- Area code: +389/48/4XXXXX

Kadino Selo is a village in Municipality of Prilep, North Macedonia. Macedonian revolutionary Metody Patchev died here and is buried in the local church.

== History ==
During the Ottoman Empire era, Kadino Selo was famous for its grapes harvesting and apple farms. The Battle of Kadino Selo which occurred in March 1902, was one that involved the local population including rebels from the IMRO against a large force of Ottoman Turkish soldiers.

== Demographics ==
According to the 2002 census, the village had a total of 269 inhabitants. Ethnic groups in the village include:

- Macedonians 269
